= Wood Lake =

Wood Lake may refer to:

== Places in the United States ==
- Wood Lake, Louisiana, a fishing community
- Wood Lake, Minnesota, a city
- Wood Lake, Nebraska, a village
- Wood Lake Township (disambiguation)

== Lakes ==
=== Canada ===
- Wood Lake (British Columbia)

=== United States ===
- Wood Lake (Lyon County, Minnesota)
- Wood Lake, Watonwan County, Minnesota
- Wood Lake (Yellow Medicine County, Minnesota)
- Wood Lake (Montana), a lake in Stillwater County, Montana
- Wood Lake, Benson County, North Dakota

== See also ==
- Woodlake (disambiguation)
- Lake Wood
- Lake Woods
- Lake of the Woods
