= Frank Michael Fernández Jr. =

American historian

Frank Michael Fernández, Jr.
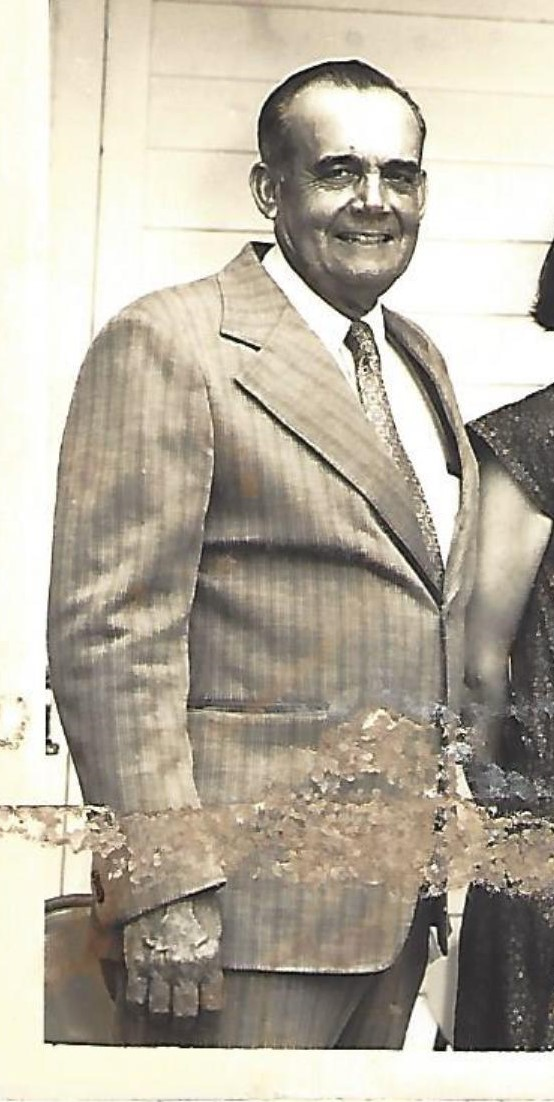
- Born: April 17, 1918; Old Shell Beach, Louisiana, U.S.
- Died: June 18, 2001 (aged 83); St. Bernard Parish, Louisiana, U.S.
- Resting place: St. Bernard Catholic Cemetery
- Monuments: Frank M. Fernández, Jr. Isleño Center
- Education: Loyola University New Orleans (M.A.)
- Occupations: St. Bernard Parish historian, educator
- Title: Historian Emeritus
- Spouse: Adele Molero
- Parents: Francisco Miguel Fernández (father); Martha Guerra (mother)
- Relatives: Anthony Fernández (brother), Mike Fernández (son), Maria Snitzer (daughter)

Frank Michael Fernández Jr. (April 17, 1918 – June 18, 2001) was an American historian, educator, and notable Isleño advocate in St. Bernard Parish, Louisiana. Through his advocacy and exposure in the community, he attracted academics like Samuel G. Armistead, among others, to study the Isleños of St. Bernard Parish. His tenure as a public educator was marked by his fight for a Spanish language program as a means to preserve the Isleño Spanish dialect. Ultimately, his work to preserve the Canary Islander descendants community led to the formation of Los Isleños Heritage and Cultural Society of St. Bernard.

== Life ==
=== Early life ===
The son to a Galician and Isleña, Frank Fernández lived a life similar to the other Isleños of the fishing communities dotted along the coasts of St. Bernard Parish which was highlighted by a subsistence lifestyle. He and his elder brother were some of the first Isleños from these villages to complete high school at Joseph Maumus High School during the Great Depression.

=== Education and career ===
Following his graduation from high school, Fernández then participated in World War II. In his return to St. Bernard Parish, he sought higher education and acquired undergraduate and graduate degrees in education with minors in history, Spanish, and social studies at Loyola University New Orleans.

Fernández began his career in education at Delacroix Island Elementary School in 1951. He was later appointed principal at the same school and then served as principal of St. Bernard High School from 1955 to 1966. During these years, Fernández established a positive reputation as an individual who was sensitive to his community. For the next fourteen years he continued his work as an educator in Plaquemines Parish, holding teaching and principal positions until his retirement in 1980. He briefly came out of retirement to serve as principal of Promised Land Academy during the 1985–1986 school year.

In 1969, Fernández was elected as the St. Bernard Parish School Board member representing the former 11th Ward and served this term until 1974. During his tenure, he fought for a Spanish language curriculum in eastern St. Bernard Parish schools and the retention of the Delacroix Island Elementary School.

=== Preservation and community advocacy ===
In 1967, Fernández was recognized for his scholarship in local history and so he was appointed as historian of St. Bernard Parish. In the following year, he participated in the founding of the St. Bernard Historical Society and placed nineteen historical markers throughout the Parish.

Fernández championed the preservation of Fort Proctor near Shell Beach, a fortification whose construction was supervised by P.G.T. Beauregard in 1856. By personally leading a campaign to preserve the site, Fernández was able to secure legislative appropriations to build a riprap around the fortification. Additionally in 1978, he was able to have Fort Proctor placed on the National Register of Historic Places. In 1971, Fernández established the Louis Alfred Ducros, M.D. Historical Museum and Research Library as the first local history museum in St. Bernard Parish. Today, this museum is part of Los Isleños Museum Complex and used to interpret the history and culture of the Parish. Later, he served as chairman of the St. Bernard National Bicentennial Commission as well as on the bicentennial commission of St. Bernard Parish in 1980.

In 1975, Fernández worked with WYES-TV to produce a film documentary Louisiana's Disappearing Spanish Legacy about the Isleños of St. Bernard, interpreting the Isleño presence as the last living vestige of Spanish Louisiana. The documentary aroused enthusiastic support in the Isleño community which resulted in the founding of Los Isleños Heritage and Cultural Society of St. Bernard in 1976. In the following year, Fernández led the first delegation of Canary Islander descendants of St. Bernard to the Canary Islands since the arrival of their families in the late eighteenth century. Fernández's work with this Society resulted in the establishment of el Museo de los Isleños in 1980 and an annual festival that celebrates Isleño heritage and culture. In 1979, he was awarded funds for a research program from the National Endowment for the Humanities to process and organize eighteenth- and nineteenth-century archives. During 1984 and 1985, he also performed a series of oral history interviews almost entirely in Isleño Spanish of the elderly Isleños in St. Bernard Parish. These oral histories proved useful for a series of academics who visited the community through the 1990s to study the community.

=== Later life ===
Fernández continued his advocacy and study of his community into his later years. In 1993, he suffered a stroke which greatly impeded his ability to speak, but he was able to continue his work to some extent. Two years later, he produced his final work, The Settlement of Yscloskey and Alluvial City, along with his daughter Maria and illustrator Robert Flautt. Following his death, a multipurpose building and community center was established in his name and can be found at Los Isleños Museum Complex.

== See also ==
- Isleños (Louisiana)
- Canarian Americans
- Isleño Spanish
- St. Bernard Parish, Louisiana
