= Irvan Perez =

American singer and artist

Irván "Puco" Pérez
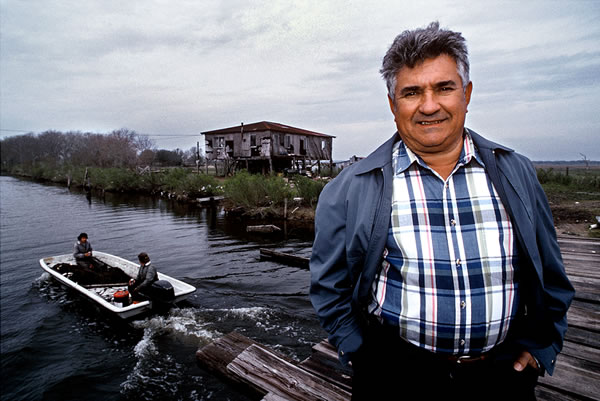
- Pérez photographed for his NEA National Heritage Fellowship in 1991
- Born: December 29, 1923; Delacroix, Louisiana, U.S.
- Died: January 8, 2008 (aged 84); New Orleans, Louisiana, U.S.
- Resting place: St. Bernard Catholic Cemetery
- Occupations: Folk singer, woodcarver, fisherman, trapper
- Spouse: Louise Bonomo
- Children: 4
- Honors: National Heritage Fellowship (1991)

Irván J. "Puco" Pérez (Spanish: [iɾˈβam ˈpuko ˈpeɾes]; December 29, 1923 – January 8, 2008) was an Isleño folk artist and advocate for the Isleño identity. He is most well known for the singing of décimas, but he was also an accomplished woodcarver. Throughout his life, he assisted academics in the study of the Isleño Spanish language, culture, and customs.

== Early life ==
Pérez was born on December 29, 1923, to Serephine (Serafín) "Fín" Pérez and Antonia Melerine in the Isleño fishing village of Delacroix Island. Pérez knew Isleño Spanish as a first language and possessed little knowledge of English until attending elementary school. Like many Isleños of eastern St. Bernard Parish, Pérez dedicated much of his life to commercial fishing and trapping. Pérez's father taught him how to sing the traditional songs of his community and carve decoys.

Upon the United States' entrance into World War II, Pérez dropped out of high school and enlisted in the Army. At this time, he also married Louise Bonomo. During the War, he served in the Pacific and ultimately returned to St. Bernard Parish.

== Artistry ==
In his youth, Pérez was familiarized with the folk traditions and art forms of the Isleño community by his father. Notably, Pérez learned how to sing the Isleño décima. While the décima is widely understood to be a form of poetry with a rigid structure and rhyme scheme, in the Isleño community the décima evolved to mean a "song of any form". What makes the Isleño décima unique is the content which usually focuses on life in eastern St. Bernard Parish, specific community members, historical events, or other stories. Often décimas would use in-jokes and specific references only understood by the immediate community. Traditionally, different singers would sing improvise and modify décimas in rounds, but during the late twentieth century, it became more common for a single decimero to perform. Prior to this, Pérez and other decimeros would regularly sing at local dance halls and public events.

Pérez was known for his high-pitched, tenor voice and particular style when signing and composing décimas. In 1983, Pérez narrated the documentary Mosquitoes and High Water by the Center for New American Media. The documentary focused on the importance of the décima to the Isleño community and the disappearance of Isleño customs in St. Bernard Parish.

In 1999, Pérez was featured in the PBS series The River of Song: A Musical Journey. Audio recordings of his songs are kept at the Louisiana Division of the Arts' Folklife in Education Project. Pérez also performed at the Wolf Trap National Folk Festival, Carnegie Hall and the New Orleans Jazz and Heritage Festival.

In addition to singing, Pérez was an expert woodcarver of decoys and was known for his highly realistic carvings of songbirds and water fowl from cypress. Many of his works were sold to support his family, while others have been displayed at the Smithsonian Institution.

== Later life ==
In 1950, Pérez was employed at the Kaiser Aluminum factory in Chalmette, Louisiana which he would work at for twenty-five years. After his service in World War II, Pérez earned his GRE. After Hurricane Betsy in 1965, Pérez moved to the community of Poydras which was thought to be safe from future storms.

In 1976, Los Isleños Heritage and Cultural Society of St. Bernard was organized at Delacroix Island, Louisiana. Pérez was greatly involved with the promotion of Isleño culture, and he visited the Canary Islands multiple times. During the 1980s and 1990s, Pérez opened his home to various linguists, sociologists and cultural anthropologists interested in documenting the language, customs, and culture of the Isleños. Notably, Pérez was an informant to Samuel Armistead and Manuel Alvar in their individual investigations. Over the years, Pérez would become president of Los Isleños Heritage and Cultural Society and later the defunct Canary Islands Descendants Association. In 2001, Pérez performed for King Juan Carlos I and Queen Sofía of Spain.

On June 7, 2005, Pérez's wife died. Shortly after, Hurricane Katrina devastated the region and completely destroyed Pérez's home. He lost irreplaceable recordings of his father's songs, as well as most of his woodworking tools.

Pérez remained active until the end of his life. He sang at a public concert just three weeks before his death and carved one of his ducks the day he died. He suffered a heart attack at his home, and he died later that day at Tulane Medical Center on January 8, 2008. His funeral was held on January 11, at St. Bernard Catholic Church and he was buried in St. Bernard Catholic Cemetery.

== Legacy ==
Pérez was one of the last of the Isleño décima singers. His death is seen as a great loss to the continued presence of Isleño Spanish and the customs of the Canary Islands in Louisiana.

== See also ==
- Isleños (Louisiana)
- Canarian Americans
- Isleño Spanish
- Delacroix Island, Louisiana
- St. Bernard Parish, Louisiana
