= Isleños (Louisiana) =

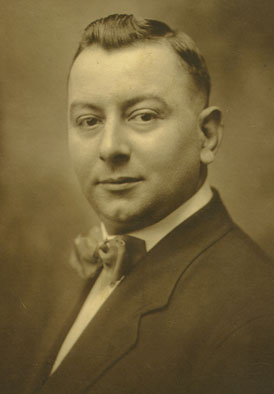
Alcide "Yellow" Núñez

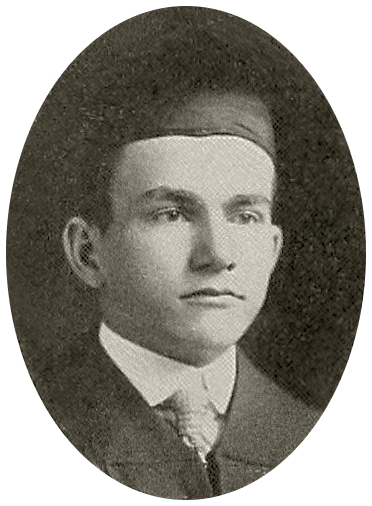
Leander Pérez

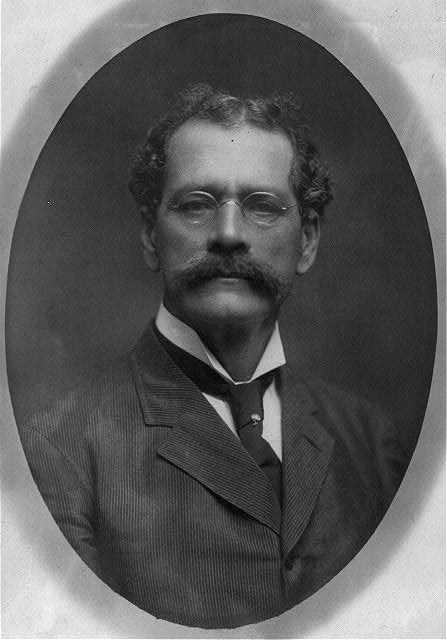
Albert Estopinal

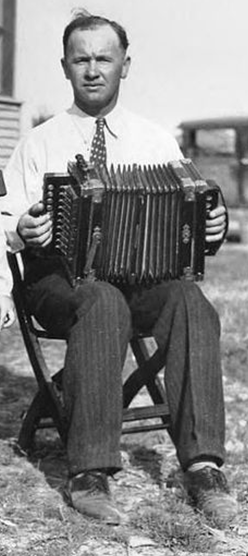
Joe Falcón

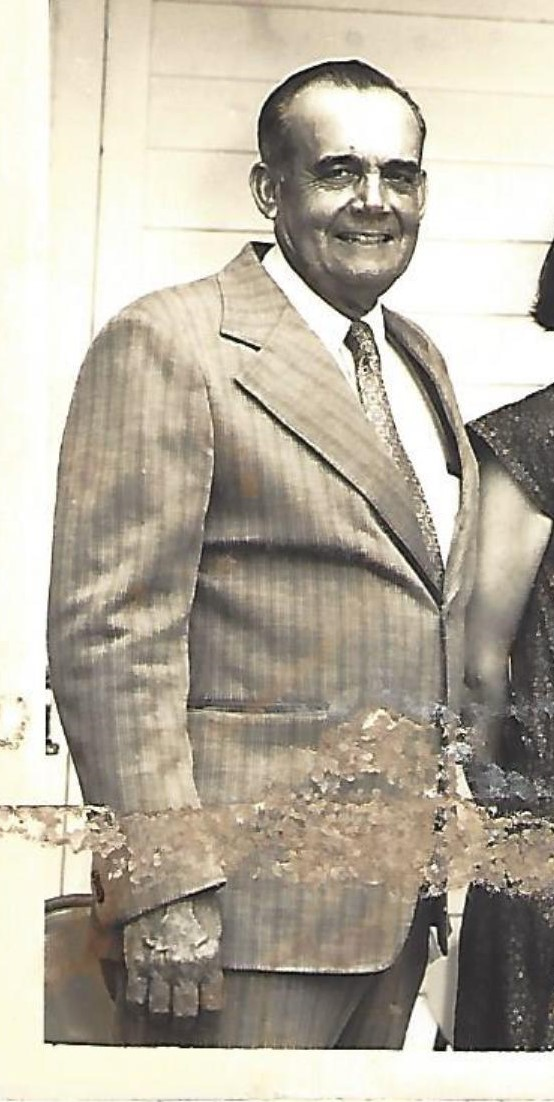
Frank M. Fernández, Jr.

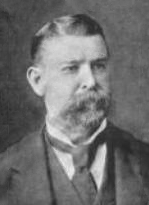
Louis H. Marrero

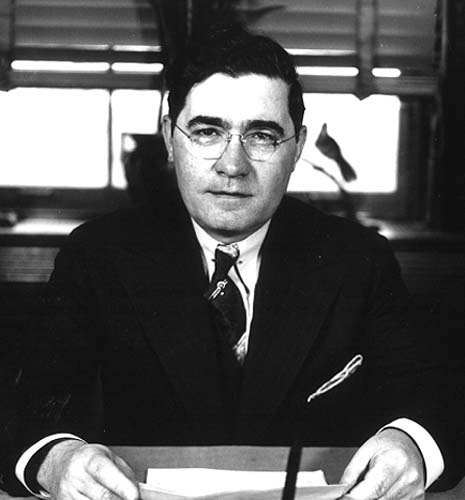
Joachim O. Fernández

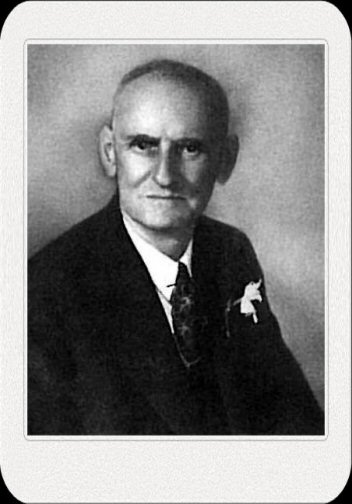
José "Tee Joe" Gonzáles

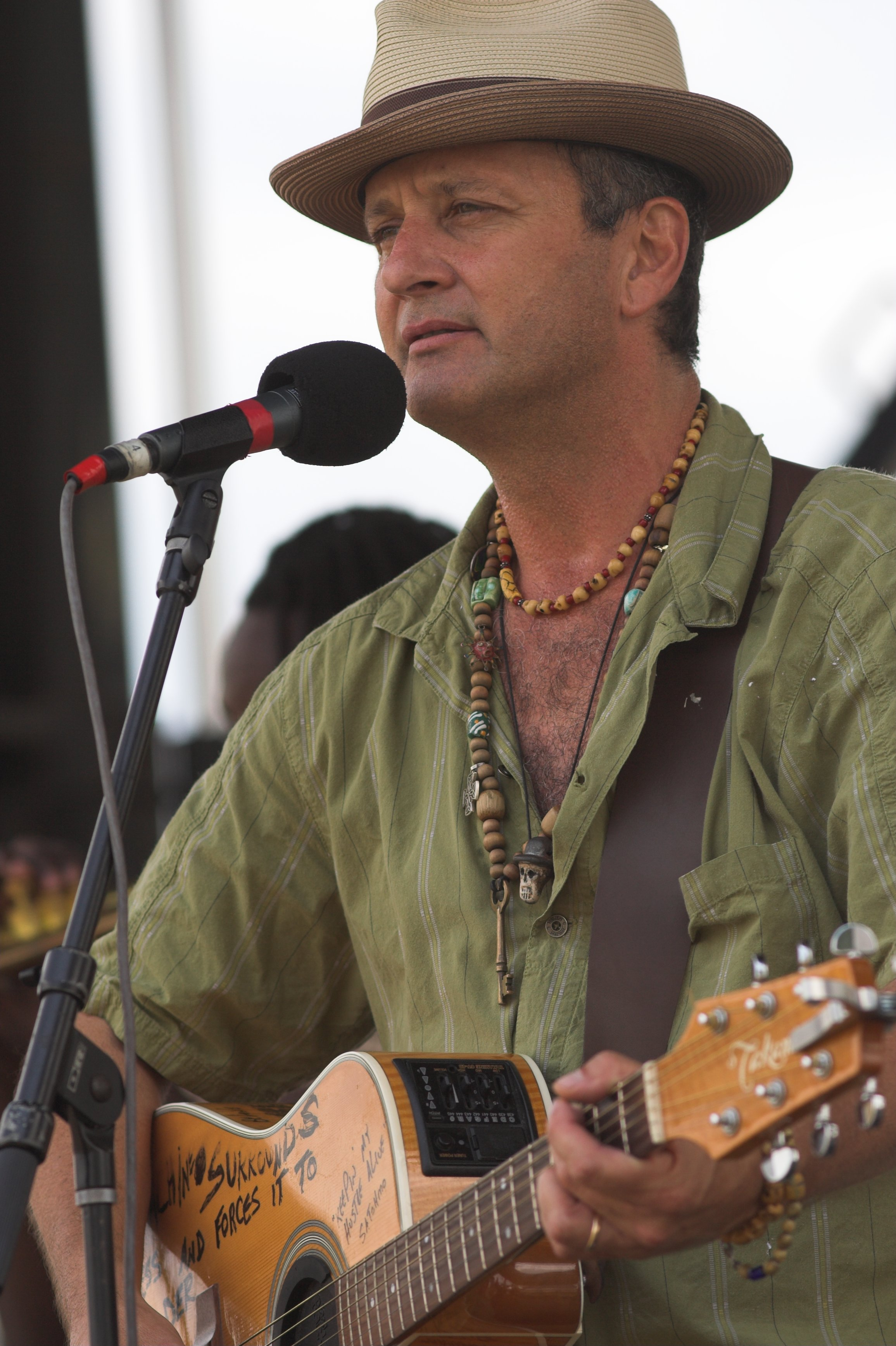
Paul Sánchez

Regions with significant populations
- Many descendants also live within the areas of New Orleans and Baton Rouge
- St. Bernard Parish: under 43,764 (2020)
- Ascension Parish: unknown
- Assumption Parish: unknown
- Plaquemines Parish: unknown

Languages
- Isleño Spanish • English • French • Louisiana Creole • Spanglish • Frespañol

Religion
- Roman Catholic

Related ethnic groups
- Isleños (other regions), Cajuns, Canarian Americans, Canary Islanders, Spanish Americans, Louisiana Creoles, Floridanos, Tejanos, Nuevo Mexicanos, Californios

Isleños (French: Islingues) are a Spanish ethnic group living in the state of Louisiana in the United States, consisting of people primarily from the Canary Islands. Isleños are descendants of colonists who settled in Spanish Louisiana between 1778 and 1783 and intermarried with other communities such as French, Acadians, Creoles, Hispanic Americans, Filipinos, and other groups, mainly through the nineteenth and early twentieth centuries.

In Louisiana, the Isleños originally settled in four communities which included Galveztown, Valenzuela, Barataria, and San Bernardo. Of those settlements, Valenzuela and San Bernardo were the most successful as the other two were plagued with both disease and flooding. The large migration of Acadian refugees to Bayou Lafourche led to the rapid gallicization of the Valenzuela community while San Bernardo was able to preserve much of its unique culture and language into the twenty-first century. However, the transmission of Spanish and other customs has completely halted in St. Bernard Parish, with those having competency in Spanish being octogenarians.

Regardless, these communities have garnered attention from notable academics like Alcée Fortier, Samuel G. Armistead, and Manuel Alvar. In recent years, heritage groups have been formed for the Isleños and their descendants to help preserve their ways of life. The success of the Isleños in Louisiana in preserving their culture has led some historians and anthropologists to consider the Isleño community as part of the national heritage of the United States and the Canary Islands.

== Names and etymology ==
In general, individuals belonging to the community are referred to with the Spanish: isleños meaning 'Islanders', an archaic term for a person from the Canary Islands. Other terms include Canarian, Canary Islander, Canarian descendant, or Canary Islander descendant.

In St. Bernard Parish, the Canary Islanders were referred to as isleños both by themselves and others into the modern day. Occasionally, this term was also translated into the French: Islingues.

Prior to the American Civil War, the Canary Islanders and their descendants in Ascension and Assumption Parishes sold their properties and moved into interior marsh. The local francophone population began referring to them as the brûlé dwellers (sometimes represented by Spanish pronunciation bruli) due to their practice of clearing land with fire. This term originates from the French: brûler meaning 'to burn'.

== Ethnic and national origins ==
Isleños are descendants of emigrants from the Canary Islands who arrived in Louisiana between 1778 and 1783. The exact number of Canary Islanders that were settled in the territory is unknown but it estimated to be about 2,000 individuals. Since settling in Louisiana, the communities have developed independently with two of the original communities falling into ruin not long after their establishment. Following significant flooding of the Mississippi River in 1782, the Barataria settlement was abandoned and the survivors were relocated to San Bernardo and Valenzuela with some settling in West Florida. Galveztown suffered similarly with repeated floods of the Amite River and deplorable conditions. It was not long after the beginning of the 19th century that the settlement was abandoned.

=== San Bernardo ===
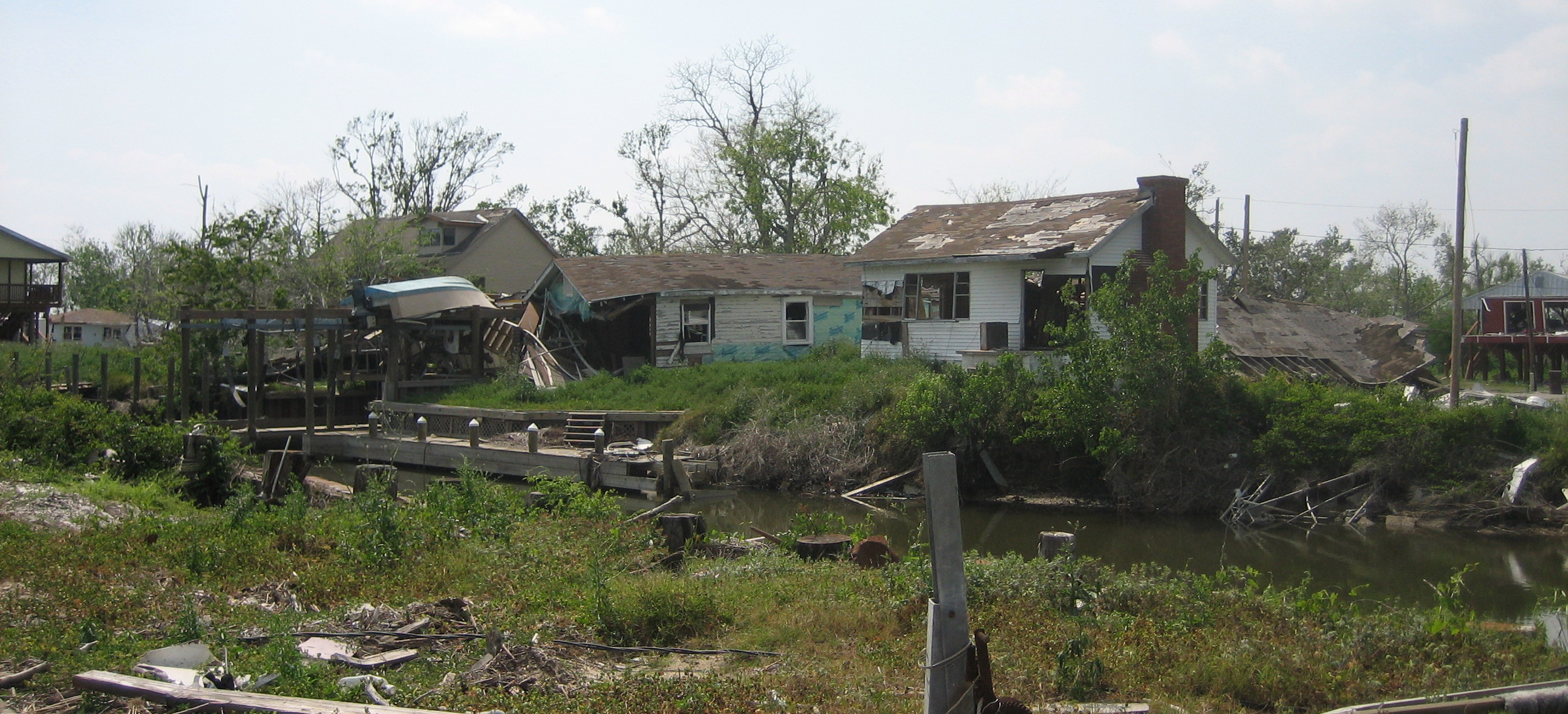
The fishing village of Yscloskey following the devastation of Hurricane Katrina

The settlement along Bayou Terre-aux-Boeufs was rather isolated, with the Isleño population being larger than any other community. The original Canary Islander recruits came mainly from the islands of Tenerife and Gran Canaria with the remainder from Lanzarote, La Gomera, and La Palma. St. Bernard Parish Historian William de Marigny Hyland has located the origin of many descendants to the single location of Icod de los Vinos on the island of Tenerife.

Early in the establishment of this community, a minority of Acadians were present as well as Filipinos from Saint Malo which intermarried with the Canarian colonists. In the nineteenth and twentieth centuries, the community was reinforced by immigration from Spanish regions such as Andalusia, Austurias, Catalonia, Galicia, Santander, and Valencia, and from the Canary Islands and other Spanish-speaking countries. A survey conducted in 1850 found at least 63 natives of Spain, 7 Canary Islanders, 7 Cubans, and 7 Mexicans in the community. Individuals from other countries, including France, Germany, and Ireland also emigrated and intermarried with the community during this period.

In 2005, Hurricane Katrina displaced many Isleños from their original communities. Those who returned to St. Bernard Parish have retreated behind the St. Bernard Flood Wall and now live in the unincorporated communities of Toca, Saint Bernard, Poydras, and into New Orleans.

=== Valenzuela ===
Originally, the Canary Islanders were settled along land grants with frontage to Bayou Lafourche, near to what is today Donaldsonville. A census performed in 1784 found that 174 individuals belonging to 46 families were living along Bayou Lafourche, of which 154 were Isleños in 40 families. In the following two years, more than 800 Acadians were settled in the area with the population of region reaching 1,500 in 1788. Many of the Isleño families intermarried with the Acadians, gallicized their names, and assimilated into the larger Acadian community.

Following the Louisiana Purchase, many Isleños sold their land grants and moved into inland swamps and woods which they burned to create farmland. In this isolation, the community preserved its language and other customs into the late twentieth century before it was eventually absorbed into the larger Cajun and ultimately American cultural identity. Isleños and their descendants can still be found in the Donaldsonville area and along Bayou Lafourche into Palo Alto, McCall, Plattenville, Belle Alliance, Labadieville, Napoleonville, and Paincourtville.

== History ==
Prior to European colonization, the Canary Islands were populated by the native Guanches which are thought to be distant relatives to the Berbers of North Africa. At the start of the 15th century, the Guanches faced conquest by the Normans, Portuguese, and Castilians, and were pressed into slavery. By the end of the century, the Canarian Archipelago had become part of the newly emerging Spanish Empire. During the 1490s to 1520s, immigrants from Galicia, Castile, Catalonia, Basque Country, Portugal, and Italy helped to populate the Canary Islands. By the late 16th century, the island of Tenerife was covered in vineyards, and already by the mid-17th century, export of its wines to England (including its colonies in North America) and Spanish America had become crucial to the economy of the Canary Islands.

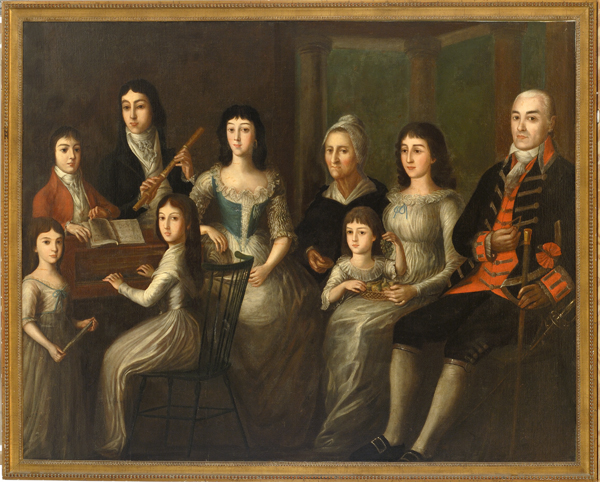
Spanish Creole family portrait in New Orleans, Spanish Louisiana, 1790, painted by José Francisco de Salazar.

Crisis tended to occasion the Canarians as in the 18th century the collapse of the malvasia wine trade created significant poverty. Most of the affected people were farmers and laborers who were forced to marginal occupations like selling coal, mining, begging, etc. The lack of employment opportunities and a policy of inadequate land distribution led to popular uprisings. The mobilization of the Spanish Army for service in Europe and America impinged negatively on the Canary Islanders as well.

Governor Bernardo de Gálvez, desiring to populate the newly acquired territory of Louisiana as a means to defend against an English invasion, sought recruits from the Canary Islands with families to join the Army and be sent to Louisiana. Recruits were offered an opportunity to escape mere subsistence and improve their situation with grants of land, rations, and supplies in the New World.

=== Colonization ===
Isleño settlements in Louisiana

At the request of Governor Gálvez, the Spanish authorities authorized the transportation of Canary Islander soldiers and their families to the colony in 1778. Between November 1778 and July 1779, around 1600 Isleños arrived in New Orleans, and another group of about 300 came in 1783. By 1780, the four Isleño communities were already founded. About four hundred of the immigrants were sent to the new settlement of Galveztown, two hundred other colonists were settled at Valenzuela, and a third group settled in Tierra de Bueyes. This colony was augmented by the 300 settlers who arrived in 1783.

In 1782, during the American Revolution, Bernardo de Gálvez recruited Isleños from these settlements to join the war. They participated in the three major military campaigns of Baton Rouge, Mobile, and Pensacola, which expelled the British from the Gulf Coast.

=== War of 1812 ===
Even before the arrival of the Isleños, the various administrations of Louisiana always feared an invasion by the British. It seems that this invasion came to pass the morning of 23 December 1814 as the British landed downriver from New Orleans at the plantation of Jacques Villeré. Previously, forces were ready to meet the British invasion, and that night, the Isleños and other soldiers engaged the British. The shocked British hesitated and regrouped the following day, allowing Major General Andrew Jackson to develop his line of defense at the Chalmette plantation. The British retreated through the Isleño settlement along Bayou Terre-aux-Boeufs in January 1815, and the community sustained perhaps the greatest losses of property and hardships resulting from the British invasion.

=== Settlements ===
==== San Bernardo (Bayou Terre-aux-Boeufs) ====
The settlement, which founded what is today St. Bernard Parish, was referred to by many names near its inception. The first name under the Spanish reign was simply Tierra de Bueyes or 'Land of Oxen' as a direct translation from its French designation. This began a long string of names for the settlement starting with (La) Concepción, then Nueva Gálvez, San Bernardo de Nueva Gálvez, and San Bernardo del Torno. By the end of the 1780s, the simple name San Bernardo or 'Saint Bernard', the patron saint of Bernardo de Gálvez, was being used for the settlement in documents describing the area.

The entire settlement was referred to as the Población de San Bernardo, eventually as the Parroquia de San Bernardo, and was composed of various establecimientos (establishments) or puestos (posts), which were smaller communities. These establecimientos ran along Bayou Terre-aux-Boeufs starting just past the western limit of Saint Bernard and extending to Delacroix Island. One of the larger communities was the Quinto Establecimiento, which was called "Bencheque" after the Montaña de Bencheque near Icod de los Vinos. The name "Reggio" is a more recent colloquialism that refers to a much larger area. The origin of this name comes from the Reggio plantation that was just north of this settlement. Original land records still show that properties in this area are part of Bencheque; likewise, those who still know Spanish refer to the community as Bencheque. This makes the community perhaps the only one in the United States that carries a name of Guanche origin.

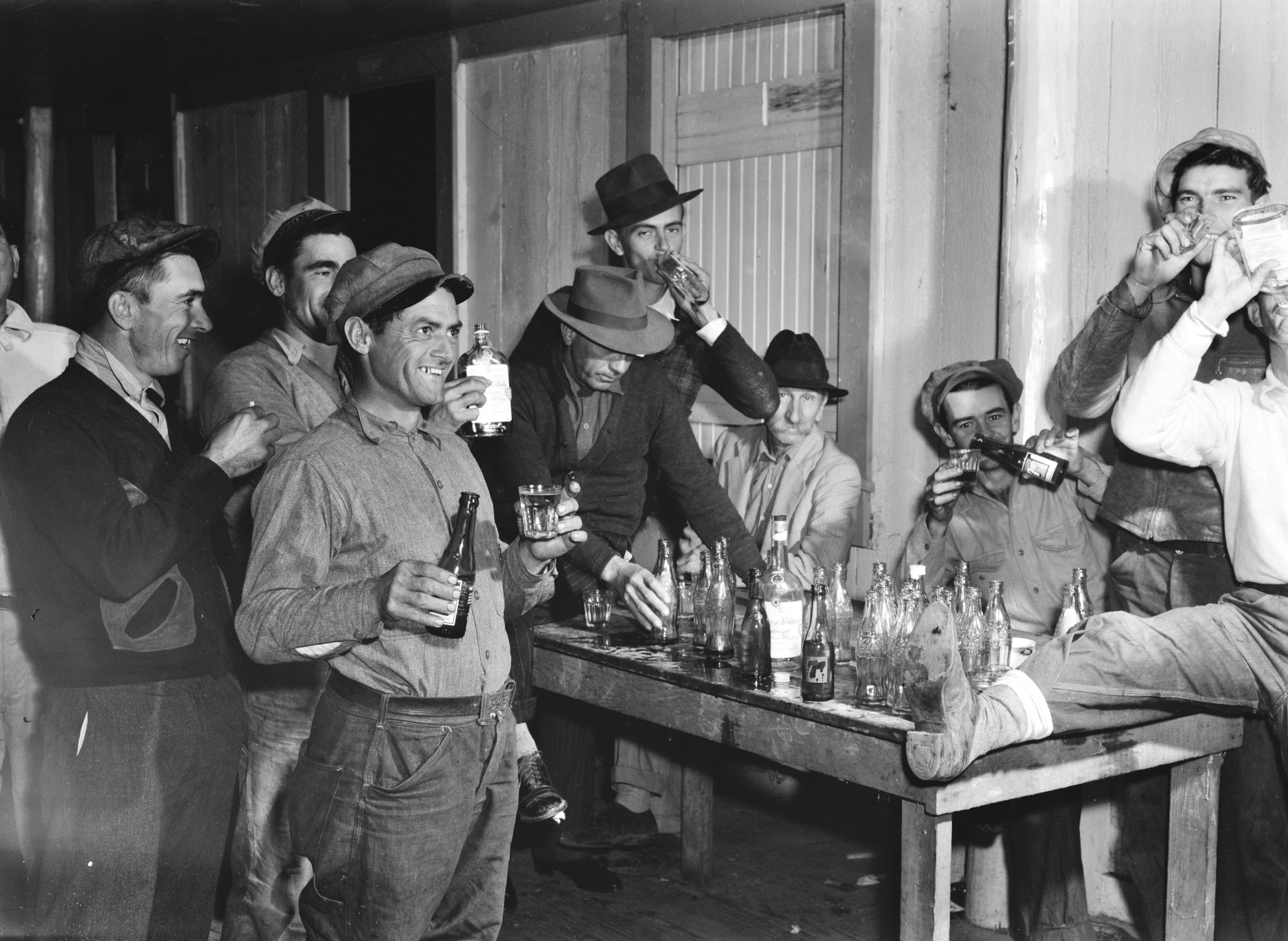
Isleño trappers and fisherman in Delacroix Island, 1941

Upon the colonists' arrival, the Spanish government gave land to each family according to their size, and a four-room house insulated by bousillage. The Spanish Crown supplied money, food, tools, and clothing annually to the Isleños until 1785, when the settlement was declared to be self-sufficient. The Isleños were almost entirely farmers who harvested vegetables for subsistence and for sale in New Orleans. The colonists from Tenerife brought with them their tradition of cattle training, their expertise in which was highly valued. It was not uncommon for ranchers from Louisiana and eastern Texas to bring their herds to St. Bernard to be domesticated by the Isleños living there.

By 1790, sugarcane had replaced indigo as the most profitable crop in Louisiana. Wealthy planters purchased the Isleños' land, many of whom were left with little choice but to work on the plantations consolidated from their small farms. While many worked on the sugarcane plantations in the 19th century, hunting, Spanish moss gathering, agriculture, cattle breeding and carpentry were other occupations. It was during this period as well that Isleño fishermen developed an important commerce in the fish and seafood they caught, selling their catch to New Orleans restaurants. Isleños began to move to the outer reaches of St. Bernard Parish, which led to the development of the various fishing communities at Delacroix Island, Yscloskey, and Shell Beach. After the end of the Civil War, food shortages throughout the South, including St. Bernard Parish, made foraging and hunting crucial to the survival of the Isleños. The Borgnemouth Community was established in 1904 at the mouth of the Violet Canal. The canal connected the Mississippi River to Lake Borgne, and soon became another settlement inhabited by Isleño trappers, commercial fishermen and farmers. During the first part of the 20th century, St. Bernard Parish became well known for its valuable animal pelts, including otter, nutria, mink, and muskrat.

Not all was positive for the Isleños of San Bernardo. On 29 September 1915, a hurricane devastated St. Bernard Parish, leaving almost three hundred dead, many of them Isleño fishermen, hunters and trappers. The Spanish flu then spread among the survivors and decimated the population. A little more than a decade later, the Great Mississippi Flood of 1927 in combination with some 15 inches (380 mm) of rain that fell on New Orleans on 15 April, left the city covered in more than 40 inches (1.0 m) of water. Local politicians, pressured by the bankers of the city, took the drastic step of opening holes in the dike on the west side of Lake Borgne without evacuating the local population. St. Bernard Parish was flooded and hundreds drowned, leaving the survivors without homes or livelihoods. Afterwards, it was discovered that removal of the levee was unnecessary and that the Mississippi River did not reach a high enough level to flood New Orleans, but the damage was done and many Isleños and black sharecroppers suffered the consequences.

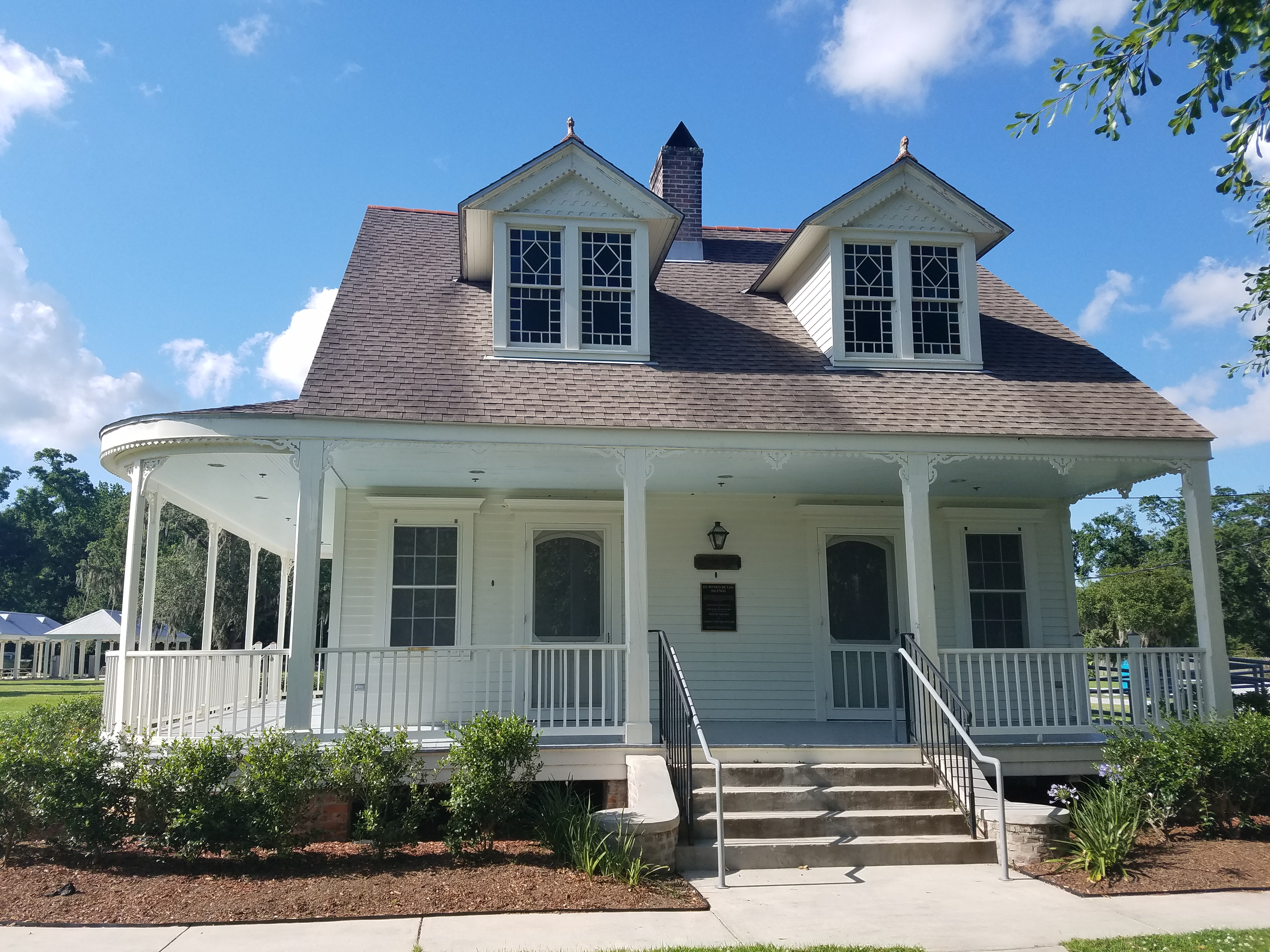
El Museo de los Isleños (Los Isleños Museum) in Saint Bernard

After World War II, returning Isleño servicemen looked for work in the suburban areas of New Orleans that had developed along the Mississippi River, and many left their communities in search of employment. Their children were raised in predominantly English-speaking areas and consequently did not learn to speak Spanish and were not exposed to the native culture of the community. At the same time, public schooling in St. Bernard Parish forced all students to speak only English. Teachers punished anyone who spoke the native Spanish dialect. As a result, knowledge of Spanish and previous customs dropped precipitously among the younger people of the St. Bernard community. Today, the transmission of the Spanish language has halted completely along with the preservation of many traditions; this has been supplanted by English and mainstream American culture. That being said, many of the older generation remember the customs of their ancestors, and those born during the mid-20th century often speak Spanish as their native language.

In 2005, Hurricane Katrina damaged or destroyed the homes of the Isleños and neighboring communities. The hurricane left 164 dead in the parish, of which only a handful were Isleños, with three dying at St. Rita's Nursing Home at the time of the hurricane's landfall. The results of Katrina has left the Isleños displaced throughout Louisiana and the rest of United States. Those who returned to the parish have retreated to behind the St. Bernard Flood Wall with only a fraction returning to traditionally Isleño communities.

===== Communities =====
By the 20th century, the Isleño communities of St. Bernard Parish included:

- El Canal (Violet)
- El Torno (Poydras, Saint Bernard, Toca)
  - San Bernardo (Saint Bernard)
- Bencheque (Reggio, sometimes still Bencheque)
- Alluvial City
- Habitasión/Yscloskey (Yscloskey)
- Shell Beach
- La Chincha/La Chinche (Hopedale)
- Monte Lacre (Wood Lake)
- La Isla (Delacroix Island)

==== Valenzuela (Bayou Lafourche) ====
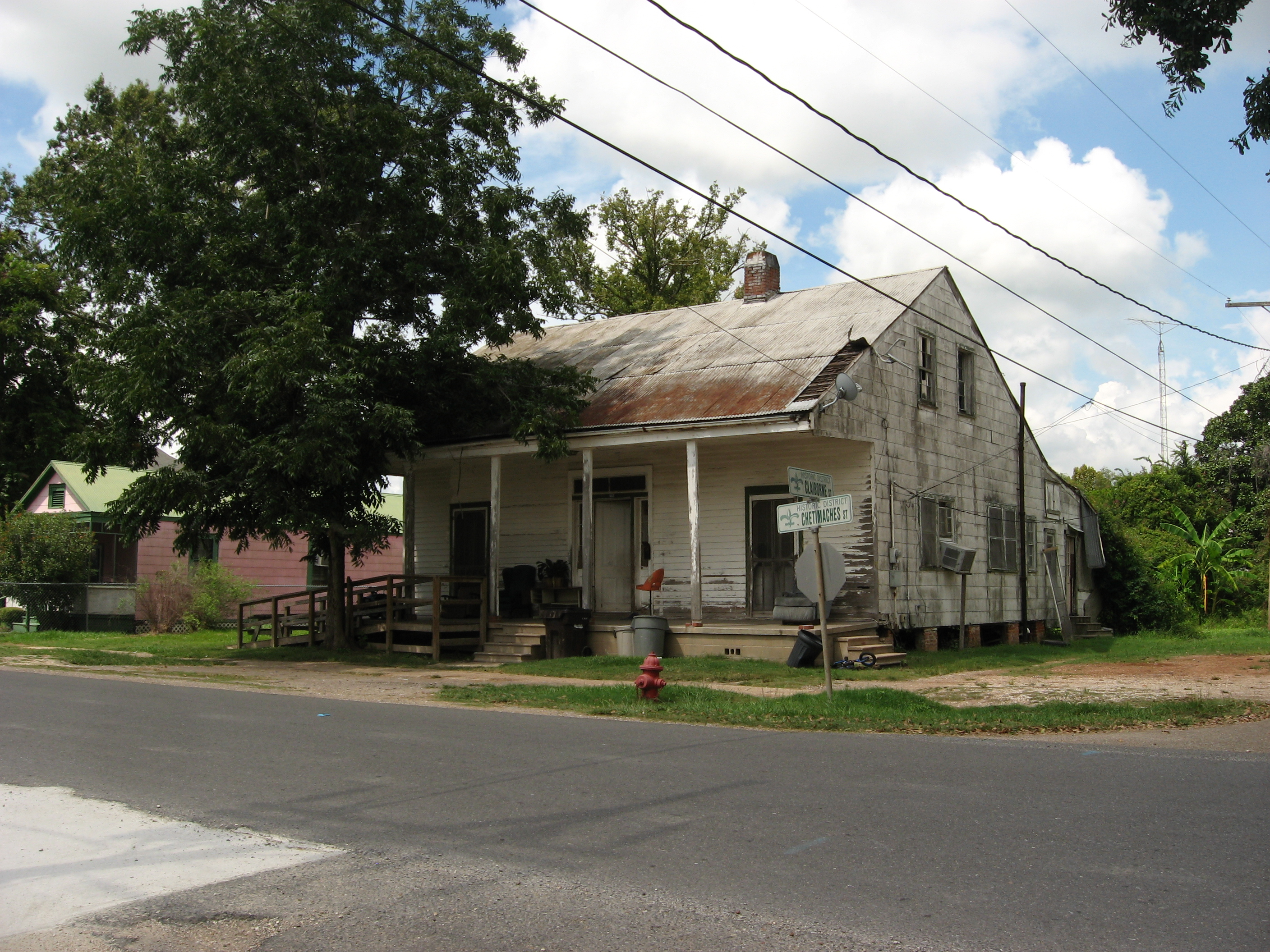
Even today, many Isleño descendants can be found in Donaldsonville.

Governor Gálvez had chosen the site for the original settlement, referred to as Valenzuela dans La Fourche, to be along the eastern bank of Bayou Lafourche just south of Donaldsonville extending into what is now the Belle Alliance Plantation. Not long after its establishment in 1779, a large group of Acadian refugees settled in the community. The census of 1784 indicated that Valenzuela had a population of 174 people, of whom 154 were Isleños. By 1785, more than 800 Acadians settled along Bayou Lafourche and by 1788 there were over 1,500 people living in the area. The Isleños of Valenzuela were strongly influenced by the Acadians who surrounded their community. Many families intermarried, adopted French as their everyday language, and their surnames were gallicized.

After the Louisiana Purchase, many Isleños sold their tracts of land and moved to Baton Rouge or farther inland. It was those who moved to the interior swampland that continued to maintain the Spanish language and customs of their ancestors. These Isleños maintained farms growing corn, beans, melons, and squash, as well as various livestock. Many, just as those in San Bernardo, also found work on the sugar plantations that were established along the Mississippi River during the 19th century. It was at this time that their francophone neighbors began referring to the group as the brule/bruli people or brule dwellers due to their practice of clearing land with fire. Some improvements to infrastructure, communication, and infrastructure were made with the turn of the century but many of the Brulis maintained their traditional ways of life.

Life was difficult for the Brulis and negative perceptions plagued the community. For example, a visitor to the community writing in 1924 described them as "half-savage, ignominiously poor, and until the beginning of the present century, absolutely illiterate" as well as "a people of inferior calibre". It was not long that "Spanish" became synonymous with poverty, a lack of education, and lower class. By the 1990s, Samuel G. Armistead found that the use of Spanish and the prevalence of Spanish traditions nearly vanished with only a handful of octogenarians having any fluency in the language. The influence of the greater French community, along with the negative perceptions of their own group, led to the community's forgetting their origins entirely.

===== Communities =====
Traditionally Spanish/Bruli communities during the first half of the 20th century included:

- Ascension Parish
  - Bruly Capite
  - Bruly Sacramento
  - Bruly McCall
- Assumption Parish
  - Brulie Maurin
  - Brulie St. Martin
  - Brulie St. Vincent
  - Pierre Part
  - Brulie Lower Texas
  - Brulie Labadie
  - Brulie Chene Vert
  - Brulie Sec

== Culture ==
Through the centuries, the various Isleño communities of Louisiana have kept alive different elements of their Canary Islander heritage while also adopting and building upon the customs and traditions of the communities that surround them. Although today, many of the descendants have been assimilated into mainstream American culture, the presence and value of their native traditions has not yet vanished.

=== Music ===
Probably the most famous cultural heritage of the Isleños are the décimas, which carry back to the varied origins of the community. These songs, unlike the ten-line Spanish décima of the 16th century, a form widespread throughout Latin America, usually are composed in couplets using four half-lines of verse, the even verses being assonant rhymes. They have been composed as recently as during the first half of the 20th century and feature themes relating to local history, the hazards encountered while fishing or trapping, the misadventures of local personalities, and humorously exaggerated tales of fishing exploits. The Isleños of St. Bernard Parish, sing both traditional décimas and improvised décimas that are composed whilst singing. The cantate Irván "Puco" Pérez was one of the most famous décima singers of the community and one of the last.

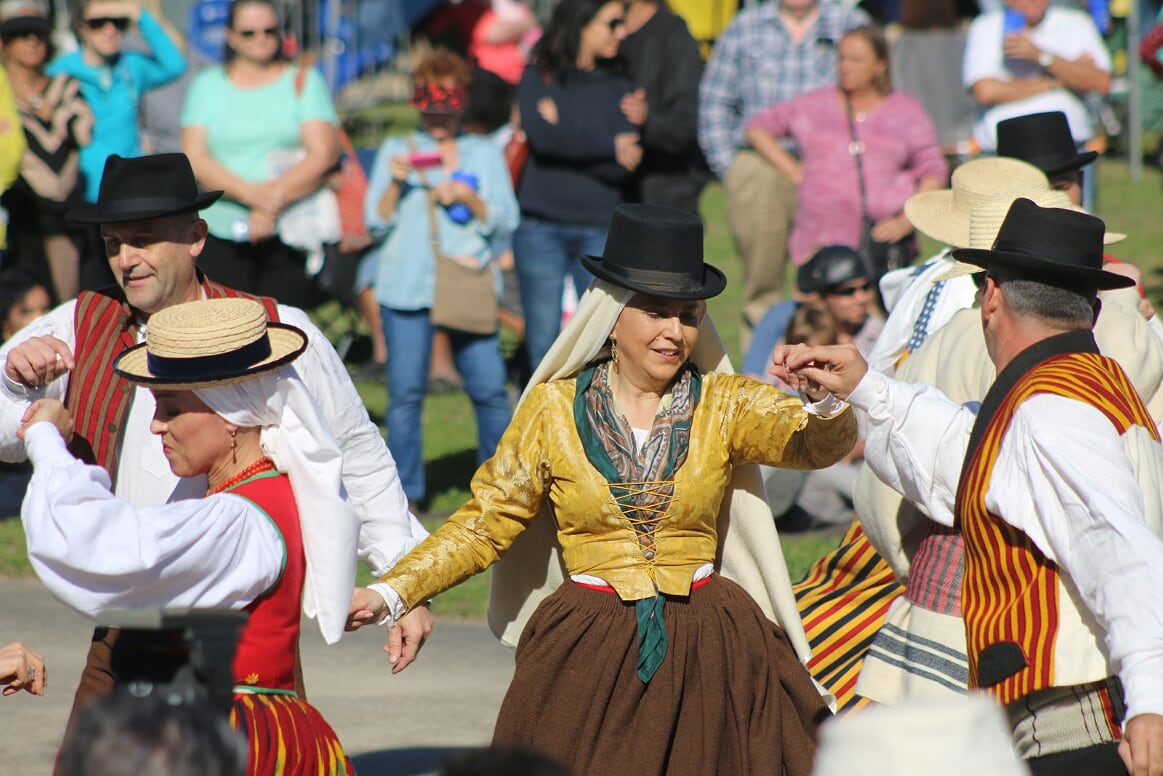
Canary Islander heritage performance at the Fiesta de los Isleños (Los Isleños Fiesta)

The rich musical tradition of the Isleños is exhibited in just how many types of songs have been recorded. Romances, ballads, and Latin American cantos, some of which originated in medieval times, have been recorded along with versions of the Mexican corrido. Indeed, many of the coplas of the St. Bernard community have been transmitted, more or less unaltered, from the time of the original emigrants from the Canary Islands. It is likely that these coplas were reinvigorated with the arrival of Spaniards from Andalusia in the early 19th century.

=== Folklore ===
The Isleños have traditionally celebrated a vernacular culture with often witty and memorable humor. It is no surprise that the communities maintained a wealth of stories and oral traditions through the generations. As such, the riddles of St. Bernard Parish tended to be composed in descriptive, narrative, mathematical, or interrogative forms, usually with unexpected answers. Stories tended to reflect the spirit of the community they were in and the hardships it faced. One of the more famous elements of folklore are the cuentos de Quevedo which pay homage to the Spanish writer Francisco de Quevedo, turning him into a trickster and folk character. Other cuentos told stories of everyday life, often in the campas trapping animals or fishing.

In these isolated communities, folk healers were an important part of the community as they provided remedies based on herbs but also Catholic prayers. One well known remedy for combating a fever was to place sliced potatoes and onions on the soles of the afflicted person's feet. As a highly superstitious community, talk of witchcraft was not uncommon just like in rural Spain and Latin America. At times, it was necessary to rely on these beliefs where explanations were not available. Proverbs were common within both communities as a dichete found both in St. Bernard and Ascension Parishes was roughly of the form Un martes, no te cases, ni te embarques, ni de tu famillia te se apartes meaning 'On a Tuesday, don't get married, nor get on a boat, nor leave your family', which follows the Spanish superstition of Tuesday being an ill omen.

=== Cuisine ===
Much of the cuisine of both communities can be seen as traditionally Spanish but with substantial influences from both Cajun and Creole dishes. Caldo has been popular in St. Bernard with most families having their own recipes, not to mention the consumption of caldo gallego. A local favorite called ropa vieja, translated as old clothes, is a dish composed mainly of shredded meat, chickpeas, and other vegetables. While hosting guests, it is traditional for one to expect a café and perhaps pan criollo.

Even today, it is not uncommon to find fish in a tomato sauce in communities like Labadieville, which is of Spanish origin.

=== Language ===
The original source of the Isleño/Bruli Spanish dialect is el habla canaria, but of the late 18th century. Those who were recruited to relocate were often poor, living in rural areas, and not extremely well educated. Upon their arrival to Louisiana, much of the language of the communities was influenced by Louisiana French and perhaps Louisiana Creole. In St. Bernard, maritime contact with Cubans and other Spanish speakers, as well as the emigration of various groups from the Iberian Peninsula, left their marks on the dialect. Only until the United States gained control of Louisiana did the dialect begin adopting English terms into its lexicon. The complete isolation of the San Bernardo and Valenzuela communities from each other has affected the mutual intelligibility between the two groups to some extent. That said, many of the characteristics of these dialects resembles that of the various Caribbean Spanish dialects and rural Spain.

Today, the Spanish language spoken among the Isleños of Louisiana gradually is disappearing. The descendants of the original Valenzuela community suffered great hardships with their language and identity on the decline since at least the turn of the 20th century. In 1993, the last researcher to study the Bruli community found only two bilingual octogenarians along with a series of three semi-speakers of similar age. Perhaps the last of the Spanish speakers of the Valenzuela settlement have already disappeared. Those of St. Bernard Parish have fared better, but similarly faced hardships of their own being, mainly natural disasters and education policies. The remaining Spanish speakers of the community are generally octogenarians from Delacroix Island or other fishing communities.

=== Associations ===
In recent decades, greater cultural awareness and fears about the disappearance of this unique identity has pushed Isleños and their descendants in both communities to organize themselves. Los Isleños Heritage and Cultural Society of St. Bernard was established in 1976 with the goal "to preserve, interpret and promote the language, heritage and cultural traditions of colonists from the Canary Islands who settled in Louisiana between 1778 and 1783". The Society maintains and develops Los Isleños Museum Complex which is composed of nine buildings including a historic village, two museums and a research library, a gathering hall, and nature trail. Events are held regularly on the property including the Fiesta de los Isleños which celebrates the culture of the local community. The other communities have followed suit like the Canary Islanders Heritage Society of Louisiana which formed in 1996 and is "dedicated to preserving and promoting the culture of the Canary Islanders descendants in Louisiana, with a focus on the 18th century settlements of Valenzuela and Galveztown".

== Notable people ==
- Page Cortez
- Albert Estopinal
- Joe Falcón
- Joachim O. Fernández Sr.
- Tee Joe Gonzáles
- Louis H. Marrero
- Alcide Núñez
- Samuel B. Nunez Jr.
- Darrell Ourso
- Irván "Puco" Pérez
- Leander Pérez
- Matthew Randazzo V
- Henry "Junior" Rodríguez
- Paul Sanchez

== See also ==
- Spanish Louisiana
- Criollo people
- Canarian Americans
- Isleño Spanish
- Hispanics
- Spanish language in the United States
- Fiesta de los Isleños
