= Wood Lake, Louisiana =

Wood Lake Monte Lacre (Spanish)
- Unincorporated community
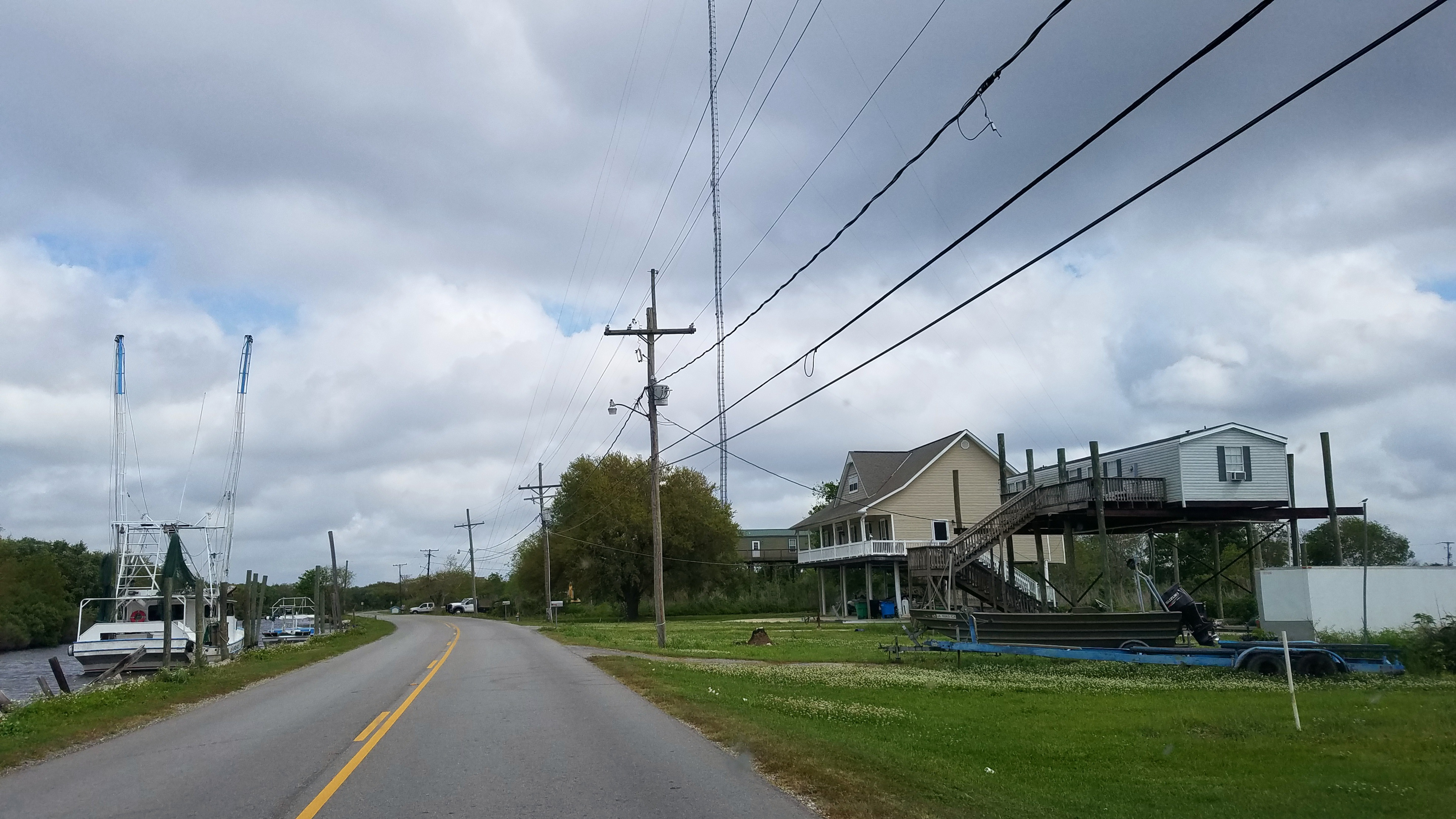
- View of raised homes in the community

- Location within Louisiana Location within the United States
- Coordinates: 29°48′27″N 89°45′51″W
- Country: United States
- State: Louisiana
- Parish: St. Bernard Parish
- MCD: District E
- Historic colonies: Louisiana (New Spain); Louisiana (New France)
- Established: 1783
- Elevation: 3 ft (0.91 m)
- Time zone: UTC−6 (Central)
  - Summer (DST): UTC−5 (Central)
- ZIP code: 70085
- Area code: 504
- GNIS feature ID: 1628526

Wood Lake (Spanish: Monte Lacre [ˈmonte ˈlakɾe]; French: Bois du Lac) is an Isleño fishing community in St. Bernard Parish, Louisiana, United States. The community is situated along Bayou Terre-aux-Boeufs to the northeast of Delacroix, Louisiana and west of Lake Lery. Following the American Civil War, the community was founded by Isleño hunters, trappers, and fisherman.
