= Kenilworth Plantation House =

Historic house in Louisiana, United States

- U.S. National Register of Historic Places
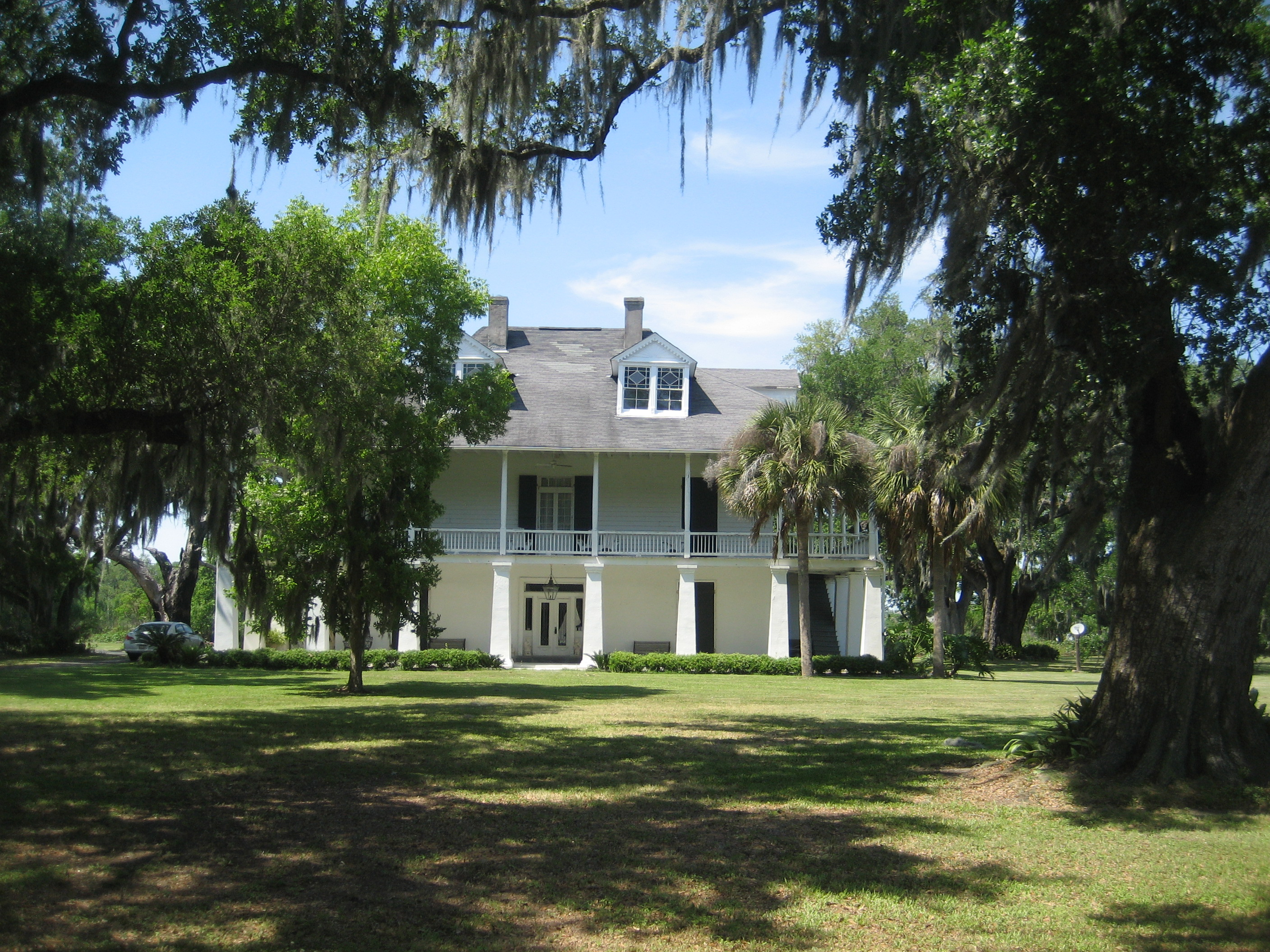

- Location within Louisiana Location within the United States
- Location: 2931 Bayou Rd., St. Bernard, Louisiana
- Coordinates: 29°52′2″N 89°48′51″W
- Area: 4 acres (1.6 ha)
- Architectural style: French Creole
- MPS: Louisiana's French Creole Architecture MPS
- NRHP reference No.: 06000317
- Added to NRHP: April 24, 2006

The Kenilworth Plantation House is a historic plantation house located at 2931 Bayou Road in St. Bernard Parish, Louisiana, United States. According to a sign in front of the house, the French Creole style house was built in 1759. It was on this date that the lower half of the home was completed as a livable space.Its nomination to the National Register of Historic Places, however, indicates it was built circa 1820. During the early 19th century, the French Creole style was the predominant architectural form of St. Bernard Parish; however, most of the parish's French Creole buildings from the period are no longer standing, and Kenilworth is one of the best-preserved examples of the style.

The two-story house has a raised basement, and the upper story is considered the primary living space. A gallery supported by turned colonnettes surrounds both stories of the house; all entrances from the gallery feature French doors. The house's hipped roof has an intricate truss support system and exposed, shaped rafter tails typical of Creole designs.

Since 1964, the home has been owned by Dr. Valentino Acosta, an Arabi dentist and his family.

The house was added to the National Register of Historic Places on April 24, 2006.

The house was a filming location for the movie Stay Alive. Much earlier, in 1961 The Dead One (also known as Blood of the Zombie), a regionally produced horror film written, produced and directed by Barry Mahon, was filmed at Kenilworth for the exterior and in New Orleans for interior scenes. At the time, the home had recently been purchased by Rupert and Elise Stuart of New Orleans, and its rundown appearance lent itself to the spirit of the film, which is now considered a classic in zombie film history and available on DVD.
