= Delacroix, Louisiana =

Delacroix La Isla (Spanish)
- Census-designated place
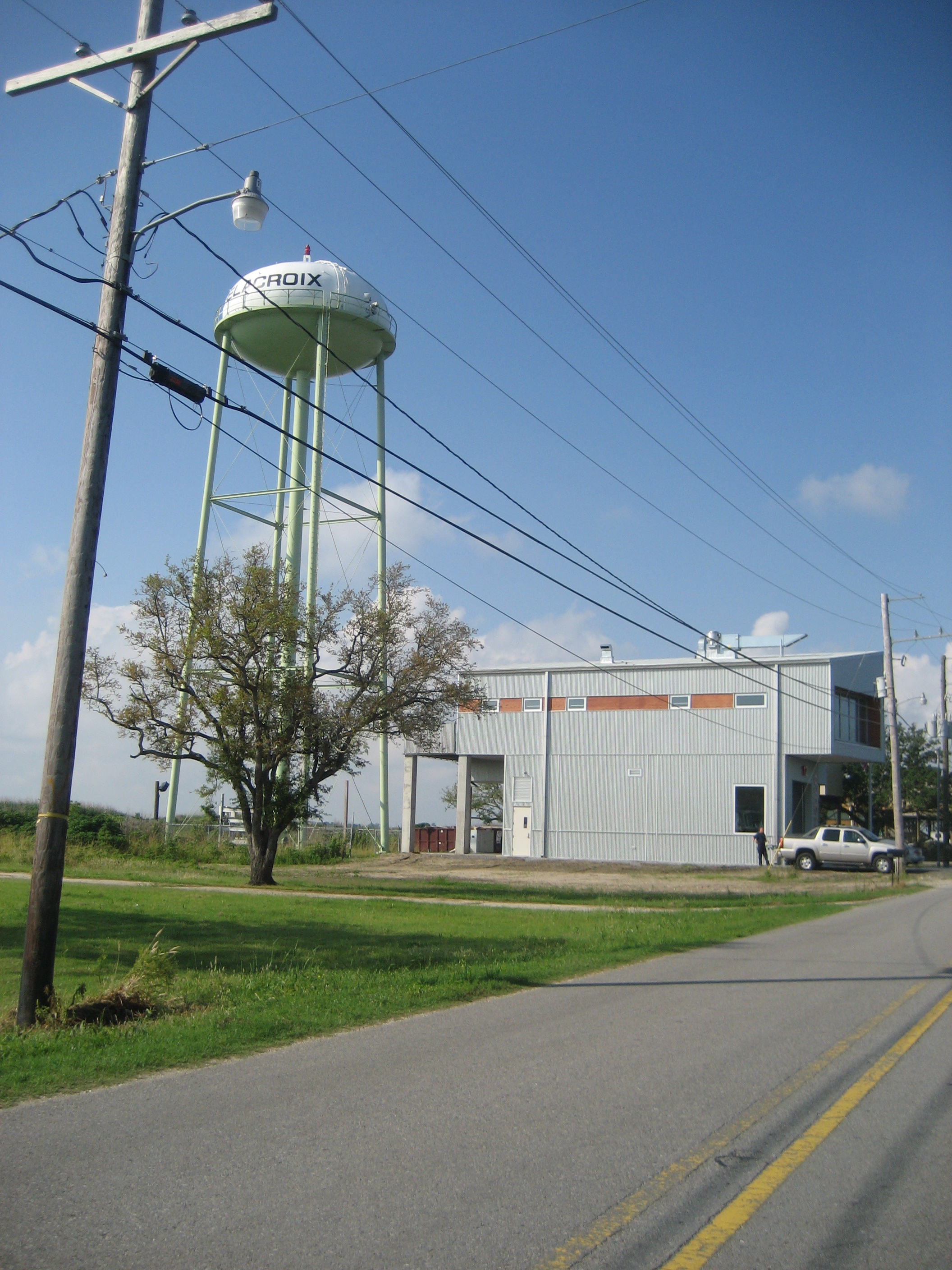
- Fire Station #12 and Delacroix water tower

- Location within Louisiana Location within the United States
- Coordinates: 29°46′07″N 89°47′20″W
- Country: United States
- State: Louisiana
- Parish: St. Bernard Parish
- MCD: Parish Governing Authority District E
- Historic colonies: Louisiana (New Spain); Louisiana (New France)
- Established: 1783
- Named for: Countess Pauline Stéphanie de Livaudais du Suan de la Croix

Area
  - Total: 0.26 sq mi (0.67 km^{2})
  - Land: 0.22 sq mi (0.57 km^{2})
  - Water: 0.035 sq mi (0.09 km^{2})
- Elevation: 3 ft (0.91 m)

Population (2020)
  - Total: 48
  - Density: 217.0/sq mi (83.78/km^{2})
- Demonym(s): islero, -ra
- Time zone: UTC−6 (Central)
  - Summer (DST): UTC−5 (Central)
- ZIP code: 70085
- Area code: 504
- FIPS code: 22-20050
- GNIS feature ID: 560617

Delacroix (/ˈdɛləkrɔɪ/, /-krɑː/; Spanish: La Isla [la ˈisla]; French: L'île de la Croix) is an Isleño fishing community and census-designated place (CDP) located in St. Bernard Parish, Louisiana. It was first listed as a CDP in the 2020 census with a population of 48. The community is also popularly known as Delacroix Island. The community was established in 1783 with the settlement of Canary Islanders along Bayou Terre-aux-Boeufs.

== Etymology and usage ==
The community was originally established by Canary Islander colonists during the late 18th century. The area was named La Isla (The Island) and continues to be known as such by many Isleños, particularly those who know Spanish as a first language.

On July 3, 1894, the community was renamed to L'île de la Croix after its landowner the Countess Pauline Stéphanie de Livaudais du Suan de la Croix. This name was adjusted later into the English name for the community Delacroix or Delacroix Island. In St. Bernard Parish, the community often is referred to informally as "the Island".

== History ==
Beginning in 1779, the Spanish government began settling Canary Islanders along Bayou Terre-aux-Boeufs and throughout the state of Louisiana to defend New Orleans and the territory against Great Britain. This original settlement was known as the Población de San Bernardo (St. Bernard Population) and was composed of smaller establecimientos (establishments) or puestos (posts). Delacroix represented the final community in a long chain leading to the western limit of Saint Bernard.

Following the American Civil War, many Isleños moved to the easternmost portions of St. Bernard Parish to fish, trap, hunt, and gather Spanish moss. During the nineteenth and twentieth centuries, the seafood from Delacroix and other Isleño fishing communities supplied many restaurants in New Orleans. Not only this, families dedicated themselves to trapping fur-bearing animals in the marshlands of St. Bernard and Plaquemines Parishes.

Like other Isleño communities of eastern St. Bernard Parish, the residents of Delacroix have faced a series of challenges. In 1915, the New Orleans hurricane left many dead and destroyed nearly every building in the community. Two years later, over one thousand people, mostly Isleños, perished from the Spanish flu pandemic and were buried at a mass burial site in the St. Bernard Catholic Cemetery. The Great Mississippi Flood of 1927 and dynamiting of the Mississippi River levee at Caernarvon left the community completely flooded.

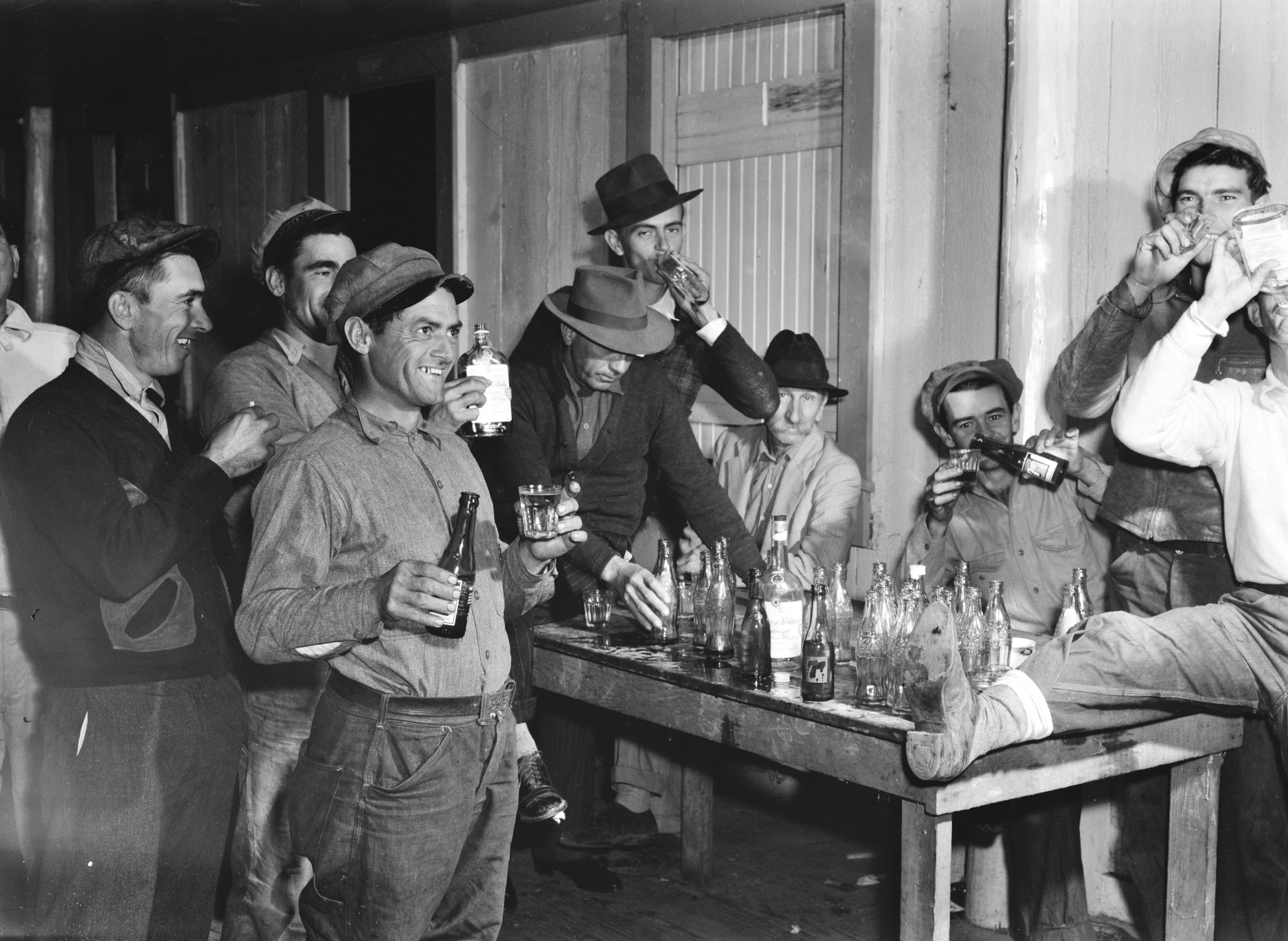
Isleño trappers from Delacroix drinking after the sale of animal pelts.

Due in large measure to the isolation of Delacroix, many Isleño customs and traditions were preserved by community members into the later half of the twentieth century. During this period, various academics visited Delacroix to study the Isleño identity and culture, namely the unique dialect of Spanish used by the community. Some of the academics who visited Delacroix include John M. Lipski, Samuel G. Armistead, and Alcée Fortier. Also of note, the former Prime Minister of Spain Adolfo Suárez visited the community.

In 1965, Hurricane Betsy leveled much of the community once again. Following this, the visibility and practice of Isleño culture diminished substantially. In 2005, Hurricane Katrina completely devastated the region and reshaped the community entirely. Only a small number of the original inhabitants of Delacroix returned to the community.

== Geography ==
Delacroix is located in southeastern Louisiana on the Mississippi River Delta. The community lies on top of a thin strip of sandy meander belt deposits from the Plaquemines and Balize delta lobes which formed over the last 1,500 years. These deposits are built upon alluvium from the St. Bernard delta lobe which dates to between 4,000 and 2,000 years ago. This material contains clay, mud, sand, peat, and silt.

Although the community is popularly referred to as "Delacroix Island", or simply "the Island", the community is not an island at all. Delacroix is located southeast of Lake Lery and along Bayou Terre-aux-Boeufs which is divided between St. Bernard Parish and Plaquemines Parish. Bayou Lery also bisects Delacroix and joins Bayou Terre-aux-Boeufs from the northwest.

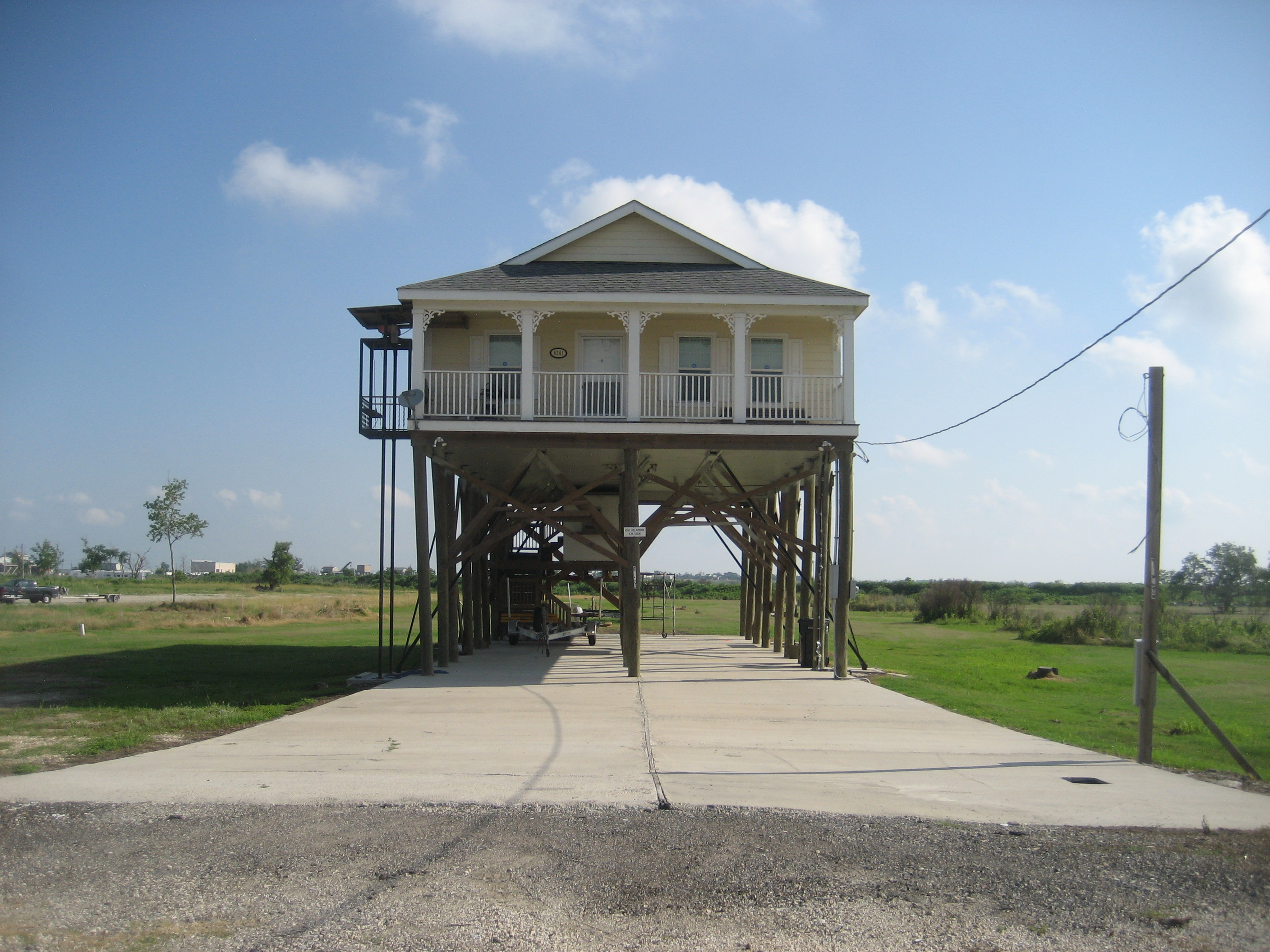
Elevated, post-Hurricane Katrina construction.

The buildings and residences of Delacroix are situated on the eastern bank of Bayou Terre-aux-Boeufs which is backed by a levee.

== Demographics ==
Historical population
Census	Pop.	Note	%±
2020	48		—
U.S. Decennial Census; 2020

Delacroix first appeared as a census designated place in the 2020 U.S. census.

Delacroix, Louisiana – Racial and ethnic composition Note: the US Census treats Hispanic/Latino as an ethnic category. This table excludes Latinos from the racial categories and assigns them to a separate category. Hispanics/Latinos may be of any race.
Race / Ethnicity (NH = Non-Hispanic)	Pop 2020	% 2020
White alone (NH)	30	62.50%
Black or African American alone (NH)	0	0.00%
Native American or Alaska Native alone (NH)	0	0.00%
Asian alone (NH)	0	0.00%
Native Hawaiian or Pacific Islander alone (NH)	0	0.00%
Other race alone (NH)	0	0.00%
Mixed race or Multiracial (NH)	1	2.08%
Hispanic or Latino (any race)	17	35.42%
Total	48	100.00%

In 2020, the CDP had a population of 48, and 62.50% were non-Hispanic white, 2.08% multiracial, and 35.42% Hispanic or Latino of any race.

== Economy ==
The local economy is largely dependent upon recreational fishermen and hunters as well as ecotourism. This being said, some measure of professional fishing still remains in Delacroix.

In 2018, the first St. Bernard Parish-owned boat lift and shipyard in the eastern portion of the Parish was installed in Delacroix.

== Culture and contemporary life ==
Today, only a small handful of the original inhabitants of Delacroix reside in the community. As such, Isleño culture has all but disappeared in the community. Even so, much of daily life is centered upon fishing, hunting, and recreation as it historically has been.

The Blessing of the Fleet is an annual event where the fishing fleet of Delacroix is blessed by a Catholic priest before the start of the fishing season. Large processions of highly decorated boats can be seen traveling along Bayou Terre-aux-Boeufs during the event.

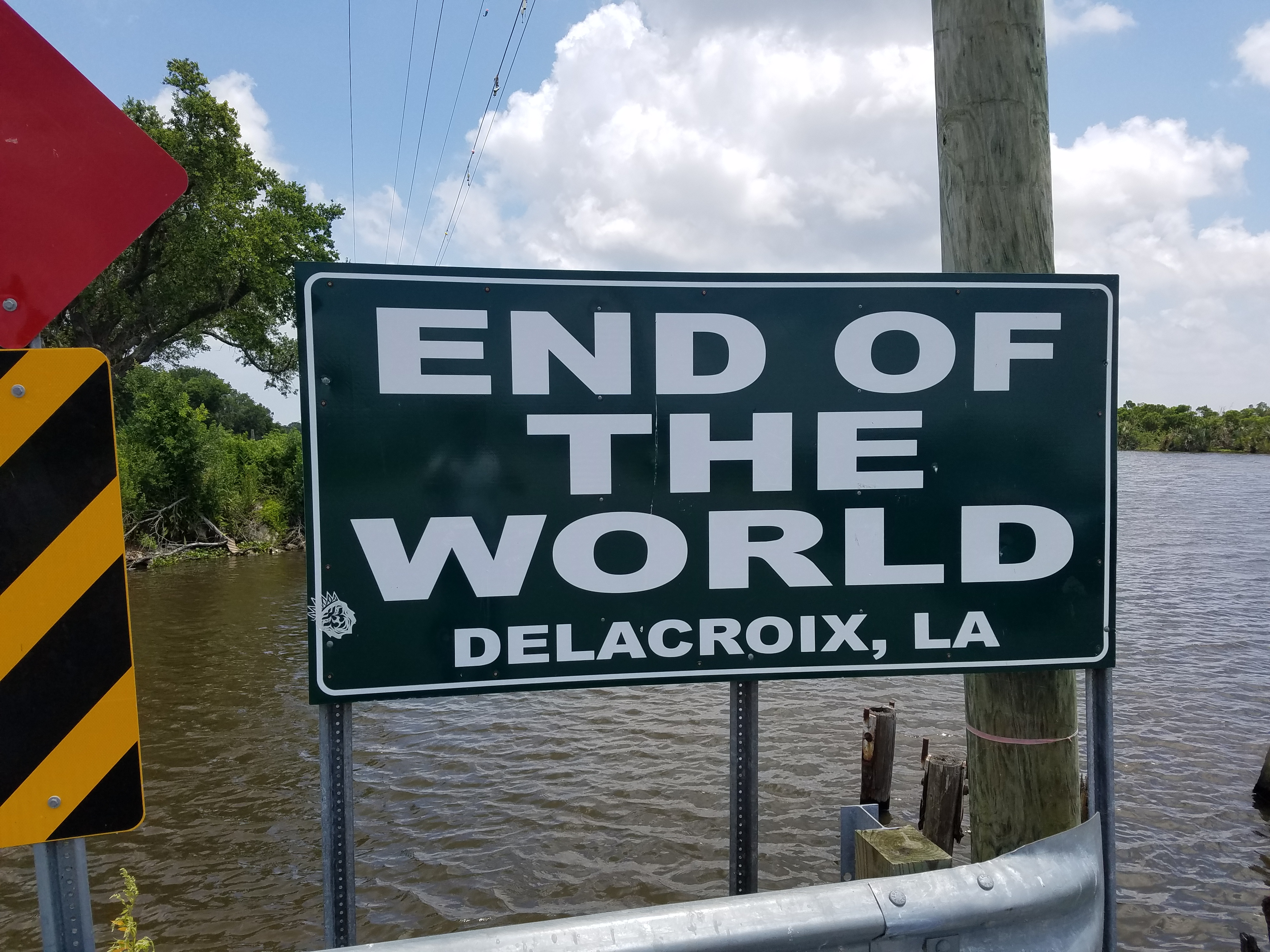
Marker at the End of the World

To the original Isleño inhabitants of Delacroix, the dead end of Louisiana Highway 300 (LA 300) was locally known as El fin del Mundo (The end of the World). Various markers have been installed at the "End of the World" as well as other signage using this phrase but these signs have been consistently replaced due to storm damage or vandalism. An annual cycling event known as the Tour da Parish takes off from Los Isleños Museum and Historic Village in Saint Bernard and ends at "The End of the World" in Delacroix.

== In popular culture ==
- Musician Bob Dylan refers to the community in the song "Tangled Up in Blue".
- The television series Supernatural refers to Delacroix and its fishing culture in the episode "Two Minutes to Midnight".
- Delacroix was featured in the documentary film Rodents of Unusual Size in 2017.
- The 2021 television miniseries The Falcon and the Winter Soldier sets Delacroix as the home of Sam Wilson and his sister Sarah.

== Notable people ==
- Irván "Puco" Pérez
- Joseph "Chelito" Campo
- Manuel Molero
- Mabel Isabel (Molero) Quatroy
