= Woodlake (disambiguation) =

Woodlake, California is a city in the San Joaquin Valley.

Woodlake may also refer to:

== Places and locations ==
- Woodlake, Dorset, a location in the UK
- Woodlake, Texas, US
- Woodlake, Virginia, US
- A neighborhood in North Sacramento, California, US

== Other ==
- Bill Woodlake, a fictional character in Halloween: Resurrection
- Woodlake, thoroughbred horse and winner of the 1903 Latonia Derby

== See also ==
- Wood Lake (disambiguation)
