= Wood Lake (Lyon County, Minnesota) =

Lake in the state of Minnesota, United States

- Location within Minnesota Location within the United States
- Location: Lyon County, Minnesota
- Coordinates: 44°21′17″N 96°01′32″W
- Basin countries: United States
- Average depth: 372.8 acres (150.9 ha) littoral area: 367 acres (149 ha)
- Max. depth: 14 ft (4.3 m)

Wood Lake is a lake in Coon Creek Township, Lyon County, Minnesota.
