= Wood Lake Township =

Wood Lake Township may refer to the following townships in the United States:

- Wood Lake Township, Yellow Medicine County, Minnesota
- Wood Lake Township, Benson County, North Dakota
