= Isleño Spanish =

Dialect of Spanish

- español isleño
- Pronunciation: [espaˈɲol isˈleɲo]
- Native to: United States
- Region: Louisiana (St. Bernard Parish, Plaquemines Parish, Ascension Parish, Assumption Parish, New Orleans)
- Ethnicity: Isleño
- Native speakers: >50 in St. Bernard Parish (2020)
- Language family: Indo-European: Italic; Latino-Faliscan; Romance; Western; Ibero-Romance; West Iberian; Castilian; Spanish; Canarian Spanish; Isleño Spanish
- Early forms: Old Latin: Classical Latin; Vulgar Latin; Old Spanish; Early Modern Spanish
- Writing system: Latin alphabet (Spanish alphabet)

Language codes
- ISO 639-3: –
- Glottolog: loui1241 Isleño Spanish brul1240 Brule Spanish

Isleño Spanish (Spanish: español isleño, French: espagnol islingue) is a dialect of Canarian Spanish spoken by the descendants of immigrant Canary Islanders who settled in St. Bernard Parish, Louisiana, United States, during the late 18th century. It has been greatly influenced by adjacent language communities as well as immigration from peninsular Spain and other Spanish-speaking countries. Moreover, the dialect spoken by the Isleños who settled along Bayou Lafourche is differentiated as Brule Spanish.

In the present day, Isleño Spanish is approaching complete extinction. Throughout the 20th century, modernization and urbanization came to disrupt greatly the transmission of Spanish, coupled with the hardships of natural disasters. The remaining Spanish speakers of the community tend to be elderly individuals from fishing communities of eastern St. Bernard Parish.

== History ==
The Isleños are descendants of colonists from the Canary Islands who arrived in Spanish Louisiana between 1778 and 1783. It is estimated that about 2,000 Canary Islanders were settled into a series of communities, one of those coming to be known as San Bernardo (Saint Bernard).

Early in the establishment of this community, a minority of Acadians were present along with Filipinos from the nearby community of Saint Malo which intermarried with the Canary Islanders. In the nineteenth and twentieth centuries, the community was reinforced by immigration from rural, peninsular Spanish regions such as Andalusia, Santander, Galicia, and Catalonia. A survey conducted in 1850 found at least 63 natives of Spain, 7 Canary Islanders, 7 Cubans, and 7 Mexicans in the community.

=== Decline ===
The 1915 New Orleans hurricane destroyed many of the Isleño fishing communities situated in eastern St. Bernard Parish. Only a couple years later, the Spanish flu pandemic left over one thousand people dead in the community. With the adoption of the Louisiana Constitution of 1921, public education was required to be conducted in English.

After World War II, urbanization and modernization played a greater effect on the community and the retention of Spanish. This was compounded by Hurricane Betsy which severely damaged much of Isleño community and presence in St. Bernard Parish. In 2005, Hurricane Katrina devastated the community and only a fraction of Isleño families have returned to their original communities.

Currently, the transmission of Spanish has halted completely along with the preservation of many traditions. Those who know Isleño Spanish or speak the dialect as a first language are often elderly community members. The younger generation of Isleños who speak Spanish mostly derive from modern Mexican Spanish and Caribbean Spanish due to larger frequency of contact with native Mexican, Caribbean, and Central American Spanish speakers, most of the younger generation live in other areas of Louisiana, mostly New Orleans.

== Phonology ==
In many respects, Isleño Spanish shares an array of similarities with other Spanish dialects, generally of the Canary Islands, mainland Spain, and the Caribbean. Isleño Spanish merges the phonemes /θ/ and /s/ into the single phoneme /s/, a phenomenon known as seseo. At least until the mid twentieth century, Isleño Spanish speakers made a distinction between /ʎ/ and /ʝ/, which is still typical of rural speech in the Canaries, but later studies have suggested instability in this feature.

Some of the notable features regarding consonants are described below:

- /d/ often undergoes deletion. In intervocalic position, /d/ is habitually elided: peludo [peˈlu] 'hairy' or miedo [ˈmjeo] 'fear'. In word-final positions, /d/ is deleted and the final vowel becomes stressed such as in usted [uhˈte] 'you'.
- /g/ is typically maintained in word-initial position but may become [b] when followed by o or u. In all other positions, /g/ is realized as an approximant [ɣ].
- Historical /h/ is generally preserved where it derives from the Vulgar Latin /f/ like in hacer [haˈsej] 'to do, to make'. Since it is phonetically identical to /x/ (which is also glottal), this can be phonemicized as /xaˈsei/.
- /n/ is largely preserved as [n] but [ŋ] is occasionally heard. However, the sequence [jn] results in the loss of [n].
- /r/ remains an alveolar trill in word-initial position or when written <rr>. Elsewhere, it can be realized as [l] at the end of a syllable so that arte 'seine' is often pronounced [ˈalte] rather than [ˈaɾte]. With some speakers, this becomes [h] so that porque 'because' is pronounced [ˈpohke]. Just like with /d/, in word-final position, /r/ is habitually deleted.
- /s/ is typically becomes the aspirate [h] but is preserved in intervocalic positions like los casas [loh ˈkasah] 'the houses' and other instances.
- /x/ is pronounced [h] exclusively, which is common in the southern Spain, the Canary Islands, and throughout the Caribbean.

As for the vowels used in Isleño Spanish, there are a handful of differences to Standard Spanish. In certain instances, e is raised to i in everyday speech such as decir [ðiˈsi] 'to say'. A similar phenomenon occurs with o, where it is generally raised to u: llover [ʎuˈβej] 'to rain'. Additionally, the diphthong [ej] is often pronounced as [aj] in words like seis [ˈsajh] 'six' or rey [ˈraj] 'king' which can be found in the Canaries and rural Spain.

== Morphology and syntax ==
The grammatical gender of certain words in Isleño Spanish differs from that of other dialects. Some examples include el costumbre (la costumbre), la color (el color) and el miel (la miel). It has been suggested that these differences are due to the early influence of Portuguese on Canarian Spanish.

Pronouns are often used redundantly in Isleño Spanish, just as in Caribbean dialects, for phonological reasons and to maintain the distinction between subjects. Moreover, the pronouns vos and vosotros remain unknown in the community.

Non-inverted questions such as ¿Cómo usted se llama? rather than ¿Cómo se llama usted? are common in Isleño Spanish, which is a characteristic shared by various Caribbean Spanish varieties, possibly originating from the Canary Islands.

== Vocabulary ==
Contact with other groups and substantial immigration into the St. Bernard community has shaped their vocabulary to some extent. Some of the largest contributions have been made by English, Louisiana French, Louisiana Creole, regional dialects of Spanish, and the various Castilian languages. Additionally, several archaic terms deriving from Old Spanish have been preserved.

A handful of terms originating from the Guanche languages have continued to be used in Isleño Spanish. In particular, the word gofio is used to describe toasted cornmeal or flour which is nearly identical to its usage in the Canaries. Also present is totizo 'nape of the neck', which is believed to come from the Guanches as well.

Isleño Spanish	Canarian Spanish	Caribbean Spanish	Old Spanish	Standard Spanish	Louisiana French	English
colorado (adj.)^{1}	rojo (adj.) encarnado (adj.) colorado (adj.)	rojo (adj.)	bermejo (adj.) colorado (adj.) encarnado (adj.)	rojo (adj.)	rouge (adj.)	red (adj.)
lacre (m.n.)	lago (m.n.)	lago (m.n.)	lago (m.n.)	lago (m.n.)	lac (m.n.)	lake (n.)
liña (f.n.)	liña (f.n.)	sedal (m.n.)	liña (f.n.)	sedal (m.n.)	fil de pêche (m.n.) ligne de pêche (f.n.)	fishing line (n.) string (n.)
mancar (v.)	extrañar (v.) fallar (v.)	extrañar (v.) fallar (v.)	mancar (v.)	extrañar (v.) fallar (v.)	manquer (v.) rater (v.)	to miss (v.) to fail (v.)
marqueta (f.n.)	mercado (m.n.)	mercado (m.n.)	mercado (m.n.)	mercado (m.n.)	marché (m.n.)	market (n.)
peje (m.n.)	pez (m.n.) peje (m.n.)	pez (m.n.) peje (m.n.)	peçe, pexe (m.n.)	pez (m.n.)	poisson (m.n.)	fish (n.)
romana (f.n.)	vestido (m.n.)	vestido (m.n.)	vestido (m.n.)	vestido (m.n.)	romaine (f.)	woman's dress (n.)
sosón, susón (m.n)	calcetín (m.n.) media (f.n.)	calcetín (m.n.) calceta (f.n.)	calça (f.n.)	calcetín (m.n.) media (f.n.)	chausson (m.n.) bas (m.n.)	sock (n.) stocking (n.)
seña (f.n.) letrero (m.n.)	seña (f.n.) letrero (m.n.)	letrero (m.n.) cartel (m.n.)	señal (f.n.)	letrero (m.n.) cartel (m.n.)	signe (f.n.)	sign (n.)
tío (m.n.) titi, tite (m.n.)	tío (m.n.) tití, titi (m.n.)	tío (m.n.)	tío, tyo (m.n.)	tío (m.n.)	oncle (m.n.) nonc (m.n.)	uncle (n.)

1. The comparison of terms below uses the following abbreviations for different parts of speech: (n.) noun, (m.n.) masculine noun, (f.n.) feminine noun, (v.) verb, (adj.) adjective.

== Brule Spanish ==
The Isleños who settled in the community of Valenzuela along Bayou Lafourche were greatly influenced by the immigration of Acadian refugees and further isolation. The dialect has been considered an "offshoot" of Isleño Spanish and is referred to as Brule Spanish. The name comes from the agricultural practices of the Isleño community near the Bayou Lafourche, who, after 1820, sold much of their farmland and started new farms on swampland that they cleared and burned known as brulis. During the latter half of the 20th century, the Isleños left these communities, leading to the dissolution of their speech community. Their dialect is highly endangered if not already extinct as only a few dozen octogenarian speakers were known to exist in the early 1990s.

The dialect possesses a large number of loanwords from Louisiana French which is seen as the main distinction between it and Isleño Spanish. Even so, an amount of similarities in vocabulary between Brule and Isleño Spanish exist:

Brule Spanish	Isleño Spanish	Canarian Spanish	Standard Spanish	Louisiana French	Louisiana Creole	English
ajina/ajena, ansí (adv.)^{1}	asina (adv.)	así, ansina, asina (adv.)	así (adv.)	donc (adv.)	donk (adv.)	so (adv.) thus (adv.)
cambar (v.)	cambar (v.)	cambar (v.)	doblar (v.) torcer (v.)	plier (v.) tordre (v.)	pliyé (v.) tordé, tortiyé, tourné (v.)	to bend (v.) to twist (v.)
coquilla (f.n.)	coquilla (f.n.)	concha (f.n.)	concha (f.n.)	coquille (f.n.)	kokiy, lékay, ekay (n.)	shell (n.)
costumbre (m.n.)	costumbre (m.n.)	costumbre (f.n.)	costumbre (f.n.)	coutume (f.n.)	labitud, labichud (n.) koutumm (n.)	custom (n.) habit (n.)
dir (v.)	dir (v.)	ir (v.) dir (v.)	ir (v.)	aller (v.)	ale, alé (v.)	to go (v.)
grocería (f.n.)	grocería (f.n.)	supermercado (m.n.) tienda de comestibles (f.n.)	supermercado (m.n.)	boutique (f.n.) grosserie, grocerie (f.n.)	grosri, lagrosri (n.)	grocery store (n.)
mesmo (adj.)	mesmo (adj.)	mismo, mesmo (adj.)	mismo (adj.)	même (adj.)	mème (adj.) parèy (adj.)	same (adj.)
pandil (m.n.)	pandil (m.n.)	reloj (m.n.)	reloj (m.n.)	pandule (f.n.)	lapandil, lapendil (n.) lòrlòj (n.)	clock (n.)

1. The comparison of terms below uses the following abbreviations for different parts of speech: (n.) noun, (m.n.) masculine noun, (f.n.) feminine noun, (v.) verb, (adj.) adjective, (adv.) adverb.

== Notable Isleño Spanish-speaking people ==
- Frank Michael Fernández, Jr.
- Irván "Puco" Pérez

== See also ==
- Isleño (Louisiana)
- Canarian Spanish
- Caribbean Spanish
- Spanish in the United States
- Sabine River Spanish
