= Isleños Fiesta =

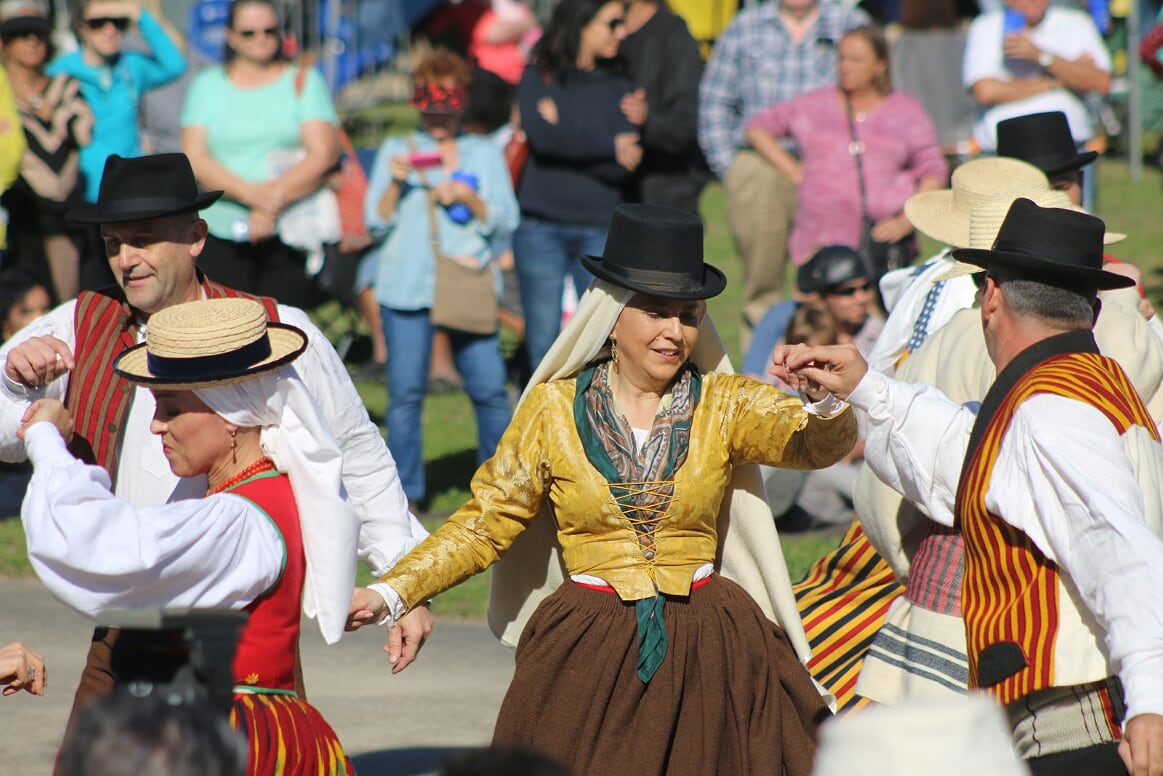
Canary Islander heritage performance at the Fiesta de los Isleños

La Fiesta de los Isleños, often referred to as Los Isleños Fiesta, is an annual festival held in St. Bernard Parish, Louisiana, celebrating the Spanish heritage and culture of the Canary Islanders who settled in St. Bernard between 1778 and 1783. The event is hosted by Los Isleños Heritage and Cultural Society of St. Bernard, which was established in 1976. La Fiesta de los Isleños is a two-day event held at the beginning of March and hosts heritage performances by local groups as well as groups from the Canary Islands. Local bands perform in both English and Spanish as well as craftsmen and vendors display their works. Traditional Spanish food of the community is available to attendees as well as Cajun and Creole food. Dishes include Paella, Caldo (a Spanish Soup), Shrimp n' Grits, as well as more American staples for the less adventurous.

No fiesta was held in 2020.

== See also ==
- Isleño (Louisiana)
