= Hurricane & Storm Damage Risk Reduction System =

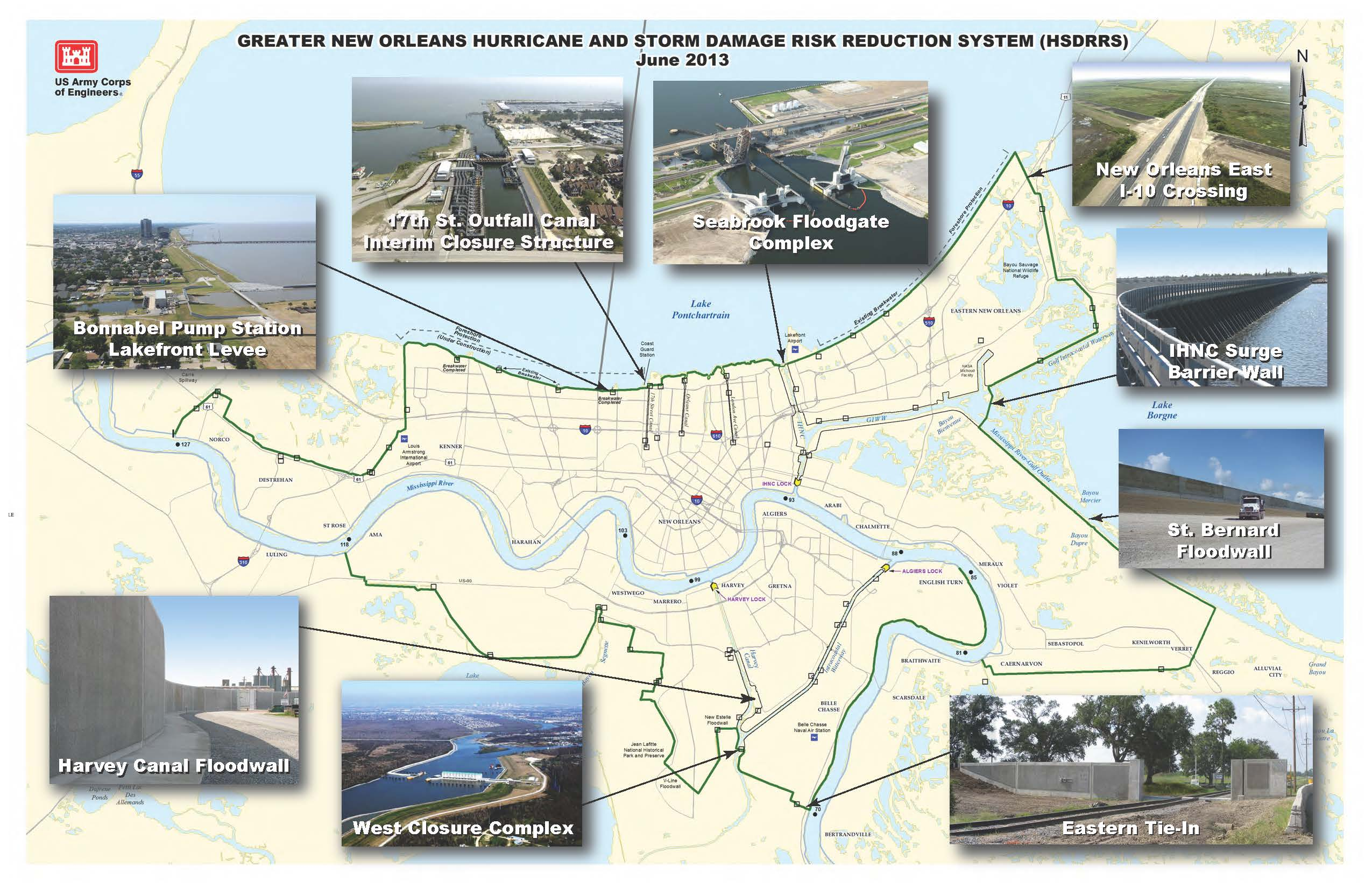
The Greater New Orleans Hurricane & Storm Damage Risk Reduction System 2014

The Hurricane & Storm Damage Risk Reduction System (HSDRRS) is an integrated flood protection system in southern Louisiana designed to provide the Greater New Orleans area with a 100-year level of risk reduction—meaning protection against a storm surge that has a 1% chance of occurring or being exceeded in any given year. In 2019, the U.S. Army Corps of Engineers warned that accelerated sea level rise and ongoing land subsidence could reduce the system’s designed level of protection by 2023.

== History ==
While a protection system existed prior to 2005, following Hurricane Katrina, Congress authorized and funded the construction of the 100-year level risk reduction system, known as the Hurricane and Storm Damage Risk Reduction System (HSDRRS). The HSDRRS includes five parishes (Orleans, Jefferson, St. Bernard, St. Charles, and Plaquemines) and consists of 350 miles of levees and floodwalls; 73 non-Federal pumping stations; 3 canal closure structures with pumps; and 4 gated outlets.

The Greater New Orleans HSDRRS is engineered to the 100-year level of risk reduction against tropical events and related rainfall and storm surges. The $14 billion system includes the construction or improvement of 133 miles of perimeter risk reduction features, such as levees, floodwalls, floodgates and pump stations. HSDRRS was designed for a 50-year project life and the design accounted for sea level rise, subsidence and increased storm frequency throughout that time frame. Construction of the system also included resiliency features, such as the armoring of the backside of levees and floodwalls to prevent scour in the event of wave overtopping.

The Corps also supports the multiple lines of defense strategy for reducing risk, which includes the restoration of Louisiana's coastal areas. Coastal habitats provide an important buffer between open water and structural protection like the HSDRRS.

== Construction ==
The HSDRRS was designed and built under an accelerated schedule by the U.S. Army Corps of Engineers' New Orleans District within the Mississippi Valley Division. The program involved more than 70 individual projects and adopted a design-build approach to meet post-Hurricane Katrina deadlines. Major components include 133 mi (214 km) of perimeter levees and floodwalls, three canal closure structures with pumps, and the Permanent Canal Closures and Pumps system.

International expertise played a key role in planning and design. Dutch engineering firms such as Arcadis, Royal HaskoningDHV, Fugro, and HKV Consultants contributed to surge barrier concepts, soil analysis, and resilience measures.

The system incorporates resiliency features such as armoring the backside of levees and floodwalls to prevent erosion during overtopping events. Construction was completed in 2018 at a cost of approximately $14 billion.

== Operation and maintenance ==
After completion, the U.S. Army Corps of Engineers transferred responsibility for operations and maintenance to local sponsors, including the Southeast Louisiana Flood Protection Authority-East and Flood Protection Authority-West, along with parish levee districts. These agencies maintain levees, floodwalls, gates, and pumping stations using manuals provided by the Corps that outline inspection and emergency protocols. Funding for upkeep relies on local property taxes and state support through the Coastal Protection and Restoration Authority, with annual costs projected in the tens of millions of dollars.

== Future challenges ==
The Hurricane & Storm Damage Risk Reduction System faces significant long-term challenges from sea level rise and land subsidence. Studies show that some levees and floodwalls are sinking by up to 28 millimeters per year—nearly ten times faster than global sea level rise—reducing their designed level of protection against storm surge.

To maintain the system’s 100-year level of risk reduction, the U.S. Army Corps of Engineers plans periodic “levee lifts” to raise levee heights as soils settle. A 2023 reevaluation report projected that sustaining protection will require multiple lifts over 50 years at an estimated cost of $3.5 billion, under a 65% federal and 35% non-federal cost share.

Climate change is expected to increase hurricane intensity and rainfall, further stressing the system. Without timely upgrades, reduced elevations could leave New Orleans vulnerable to flooding and jeopardize eligibility for federal flood insurance programs.

== Inner Harbor Navigation Canal Lake Borgne Surge Barrier ==
The IHNC Surge Barrier connects the perimeter system in New Orleans East to the system in St. Bernard Parish. It includes a 150 ft (46 m) sector gate and a 150 ft (46 m) barge gate along the Gulf Intracoastal Waterway, as well as a 1.8 mi (2.9 km) concrete floodwall. Completed in June 2013, it is the largest civil works project in Louisiana history. The total construction cost was approximately $1.1 billion.

== See also ==
- Hurricane preparedness for New Orleans
- Mississippi Valley Division
