= Saint Bernard, Louisiana =

Saint Bernard San Bernardo (Spanish)
- Unincorporated community
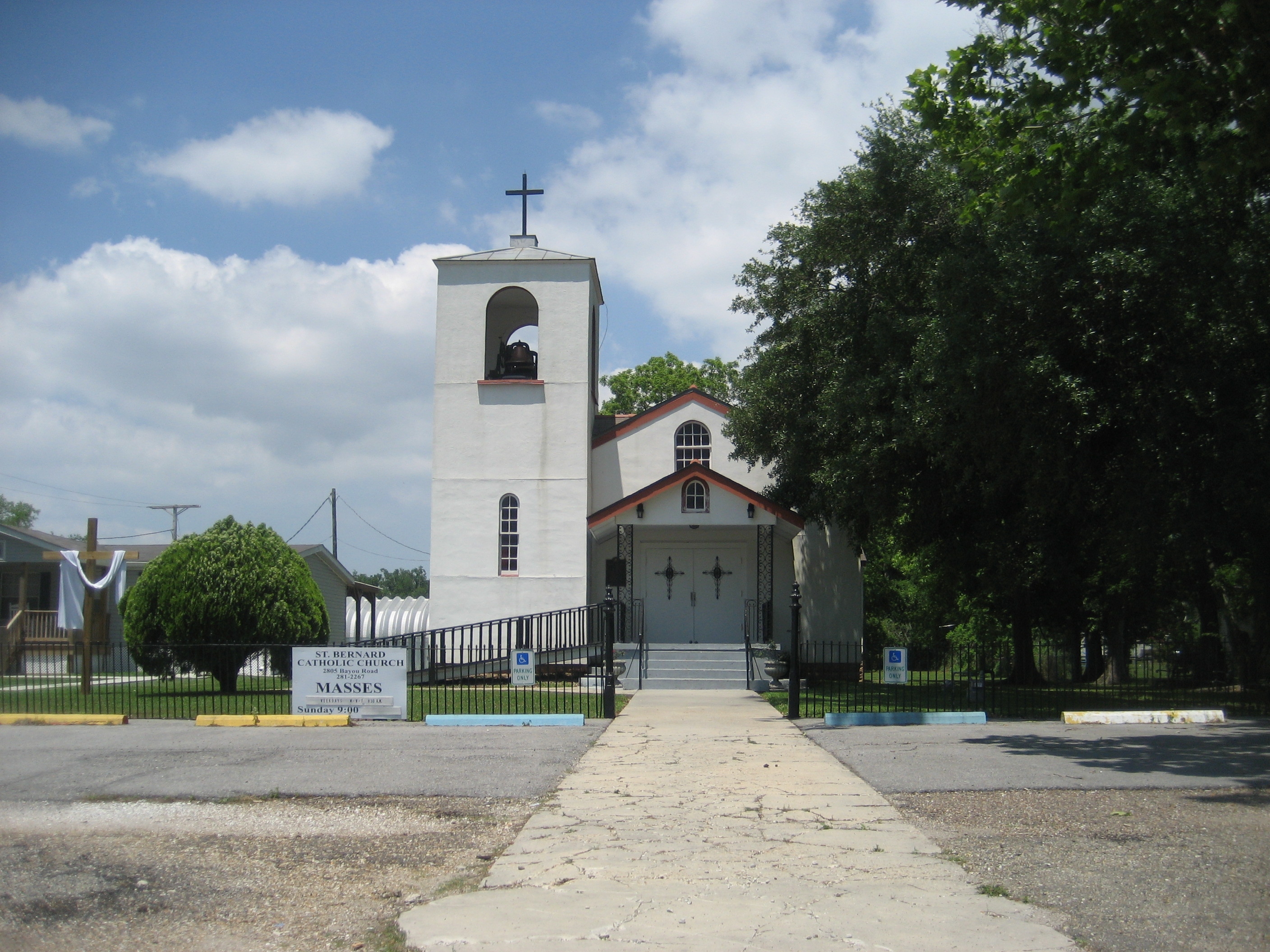
- St. Bernard Catholic Church, St. Bernard, Louisiana, 2010

- Location within Louisiana Location within the United States
- Coordinates: 29°52′02″N 89°51′31″W
- Country: United States
- State: Louisiana
- Parish: St. Bernard Parish
- MCD: District E
- Historic colonies: Louisiana (New Spain); Louisiana (New France)
- Established: 1783
- Named for: patron saint of Bernardo de Gálvez
- Elevation: 3 ft (0.91 m)
- Demonym(s): tornero, -ra
- Time zone: UTC−6 (Central)
  - Summer (DST): UTC−5 (Central)
- ZIP code: 70085
- Area code: 504
- GNIS feature ID: 1628099

Saint Bernard (Spanish: San Bernardo [sam beɾˈnaɾðo]) is an unincorporated community in St. Bernard Parish, Louisiana, United States. It was established in the 18th century during Louisiana's Spanish colonial era as the center of Isleño settlers. The community is located on Louisiana State Highway 300, east of the Mississippi River and 8 miles (13 km) southeast of Chalmette. In addition to the historic village of Saint Bernard, the "Saint Bernard" name is often used informally and for mailing addresses to include other nearby unincorporated communities in the Terre-Aux-Boeufs area.

The Dr. Louis A. Ducros House (now part of the Los Isleños Museum Complex) is on the National Register of Historic Places, as are nearby Kenilworth Plantation House (in nearby unincorporated community of Kenilworth, Louisiana), and the Sebastopol Plantation House in Sebastapol near Poydras, Louisiana.

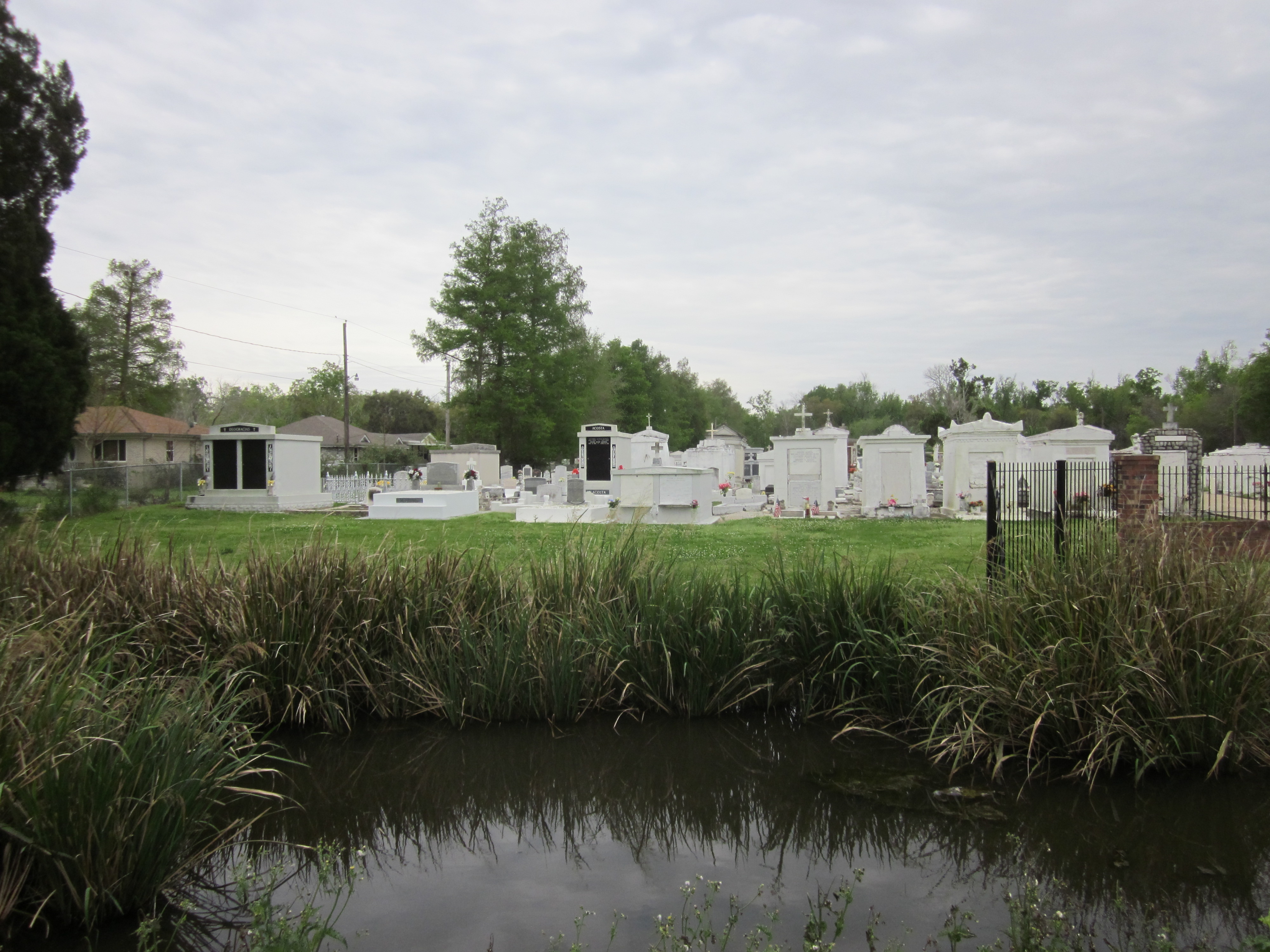
The earliest recorded burial in St. Bernard Catholic Cemetery, also known as Terre-Aux-Boeufs Cemetery, was in 1787.
