= Poydras, Louisiana =

Poydras
- Census-designated place
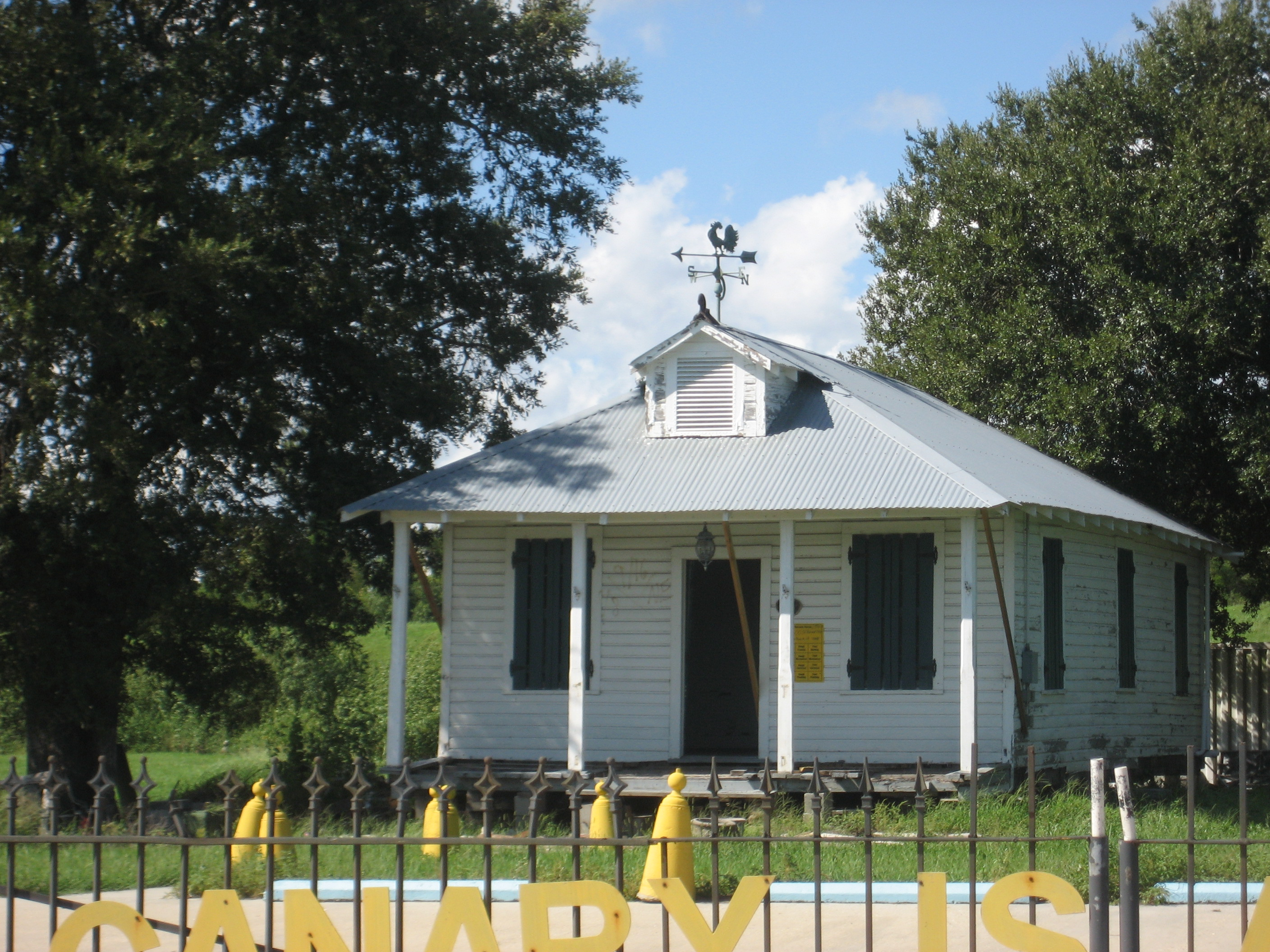
- Historic Canary Islanders Home, Poydras

- Location in St. Bernard Parish and the state of Louisiana.
- Coordinates: 29°52′11″N 89°53′20″W
- Country: United States
- State: Louisiana
- Parish: St. Bernard

Area
  - Total: 4.27 sq mi (11.06 km^{2})
  - Land: 3.91 sq mi (10.12 km^{2})
  - Water: 0.36 sq mi (0.94 km^{2})
- Elevation: 7 ft (2.1 m)

Population (2020)
  - Total: 2,536
  - Density: 648.9/sq mi (250.55/km^{2})
- Time zone: UTC-6 (CST)
  - Summer (DST): UTC-5 (CDT)
- Area code: 504
- FIPS code: 22-62280

Poydras is a census-designated place (CDP) in St. Bernard Parish, Louisiana, United States. The population was 3,886 at the 2000 census and 2,536 in 2020. It is part of the New Orleans–Metairie metropolitan statistical area. Poydras is on the East Bank of the Mississippi River, just upriver from the Plaquemines Parish line.

== History ==
Poydras was first settled in the 18th century by Isleños when Louisiana was a Spanish colony. Presumably, the town is named for Julien Poydras.

Albert Estopinal, Jr., a St. Bernard Parish district attorney, judge, and sheriff, was born in Poydras in 1869 to later U.S. Representative, Albert Estopinal, Sr.

The locally constructed levee failed during the 1922 flood and the community of Poydras was destroyed. Some historians claim that the levee break was intentional to save the City of New Orleans. The New Orleans river stage dropped .2 foot within 24 hours of the Poydras crevasse and a sound levee had been inspected and reported only 30 minutes before the breach occurred.

Poydras was severely damaged by the impact of Hurricane Katrina on 29 August 2005.

== Geography ==
Poydras is located at 29°52′11″N 89°53′20″W (29.869696, -89.888955).

According to the United States Census Bureau, the CDP has a total area of 4.4 square miles (11 km^{2}), of which 4.2 square miles (11 km^{2}) is land and 0.2 square miles (0.52 km^{2}) (4.81%) is water.

== Demographics ==
Historical population
Census	Pop.	Note	%±
1980	5,722		—
1990	4,029		−29.6%
2000	3,886		−3.5%
2010	2,351		−39.5%
2020	2,536		7.9%
U.S. Decennial Census; 1950 1960 1970 1980; 1990 2000 2010

Poydras first appeared as a census designated place in the 1980 U.S. census.

Poydras CDP, Louisiana – Racial and ethnic composition Note: the U.S. Census Bureau treats Hispanic/Latino as an ethnic category. This table excludes Latinos from the racial categories and assigns them to a separate category. Hispanics/Latinos may be of any race.
Race / Ethnicity (NH = Non-Hispanic)	Pop 2000	Pop 2010	Pop 2020	% 2000	% 2010	% 2020
White alone (NH)	3,247	1,790	1,584	83.56%	76.14%	62.46%
Black or African American alone (NH)	336	266	373	8.65%	11.31%	14.71%
Native American or Alaska Native alone (NH)	25	16	20	0.64%	0.68%	0.79%
Asian alone (NH)	22	10	11	0.57%	0.43%	0.43%
Native Hawaiian or Pacific Islander alone (NH)	2	0	0	0.05%	0.00%	0.00%
Other race alone (NH)	4	1	15	0.10%	0.04%	0.59%
Mixed race or Multiracial (NH)	47	43	94	1.21%	1.83%	3.71%
Hispanic or Latino (any race)	203	225	439	5.22%	9.57%	17.31%
Total	3,886	2,351	2,536	100.00%	100.00%	100.00%

In 2000, there were 3,886 people, 1,361 households, and 1,023 families residing in the CDP. The population density was 934.2 inhabitants per square mile (360.7/km^{2}). There were 1,518 housing units at an average density of 364.9 per square mile (140.9/km^{2}). According to the 2020 United States census, there were 2,536 people, 944 households, and 638 families residing in the CDP. The racial makeup of the CDP was 87.88% White, 8.65% African American, 0.77% Native American, 0.57% Asian, 0.05% Pacific Islander, 0.54% from other races, and 1.54% from two or more races in 2000. Hispanic or Latinos of any race were 5.22% of the population. By 2020 its racial makeup was 62.46% non-Hispanic white, 14.71% Black or African American, 0.79% Native American, 0.43% Asian, 4.3% multiracial or another race, and 17.31% Hispanic or Latino of any race, reflecting the demographic shift of American self-identification.

== Education ==
Residents are zoned to schools in the St. Bernard Parish Public Schools.

As of 2015 Chalmette High School serves the population.
