= List of state highways in Louisiana (600–649) =

The following is a list of state highways in the U.S. state of Louisiana designated in the 600–649 range.

== Louisiana Highway 600 ==
Louisiana Highway 600
- Location: Parhams–Lismore
- Length: 4.74 mi (7.63 km)

Louisiana Highway 600 (LA 600) runs 4.74 miles (7.63 km) from Parhams to Lismore.

== Louisiana Highway 601 ==
Louisiana Highway 601
- Location: Richmond–Tallulah
- Length: 1.713 mi (2.757 km)
- Existed: 1976–present

Louisiana Highway 601 (LA 601) runs 1.713 miles (2.8 km) runs in a north–south direction from Eakers Street and Crothers Drive near I-20 and LA 602-1 in Richmond, along Crothers Drive, to and Johnson Street to US 65 (South Cedar Street/South Chestnut Street) in downtown Tallulah. LA 601 also serves as the eastern terminus for LA 3202 (Felicia Avenue).

LA 601 first appeared on the official state highway map in 1976, running between US 65 in Tallulah, to LA 602 in Richmond, south of present day I-20 (which was under construction at the time). In 1977, LA 601 was truncated to its current terminus after I-20 was completed, cutting off the southern section of the route. This former section of LA 601 is now known as Eaker Road and is locally maintained.

Major intersections

The entire highway is in Madison Parish.

Location	mi	km	Destinations	Notes
Richmond	0.000	0.000	Crothers Drive to LA 602-1 / I-20	Southern terminus; road continues east parallel to I-20 as Crothers Drive
Richmond	0.591	0.951	LA 3202 west (Felicia Avenue) – Tallulah	Eastern terminus of LA 3202
Tallulah	1.645– 1.173	2.647– 1.888	US 65 north (South Cedar Street) – Lake Providence, Pine Bluff US 65 south (South Chestnut Street) – Ferriday	Northern terminus; US 65 is a pair of one-way streets
1.000 mi = 1.609 km; 1.000 km = 0.621 mi: Route transition

== Louisiana Highway 602 ==
Louisiana Highway 602
- Location: Richmond–Mound
- Length: 13.768 mi (22.157 km)
- Existed: 1960–2013

Louisiana Highway 602 (LA 602) presently consists of two segments of state highways (LA 601-1 and LA 602-2) in Madison Parish that connect I-20 and US 80. The two segments of this road previously connected on a road (known only as LA 602 at the time) south of I-20 paralleling Brushy Bayou and Walnut Bayou. LA 602 first appeared on state highway maps in 1960, utilizing this route. LA 602 ran 13.768 miles (22.2 km) in total length. The middle segment between I-20 exits 173 and 182, which comprised most of the route, was deleted from the state highway system around 2013. The remaining sections between I-20 and US 80 became LA 602-1 and LA 602-2 respectively, effectively retiring the non-hyphenated LA 602 designation.

=== Louisiana Highway 602-1 ===
Louisiana Highway 602-1
- Location: Richmond
- Length: 1.913 mi (3.079 km)
- Existed: 2013–present

Louisiana Highway 602-1 (LA 602-1) (1.913 miles or 3.079 kilometres) runs near Richmond between US 80 and I-20's exit 173. It is a two-lane roadway that runs to the east of Richmond mostly paralleling a canal named Brushy Bayou.

Major intersections

The entire highway is in Madison Parish.

Location	mi	km	Destinations	Notes
	0.00	0.00	Former LA Highway 602 to LA 602-2 north – Mound	Southern terminus; road continues as Former LA Highway 602; former LA 602 east
Richmond	0.009– 0.478	0.014– 0.769	I-20 – Monroe, Delta	I-20 exit 173
Richmond	0.562	0.904	Crothers Drive to LA 601 north	
Lums	1.913	3.079	US 80 – Tallulah, Vicksburg	Northern terminus
1.000 mi = 1.609 km; 1.000 km = 0.621 mi: Route transition

=== Louisiana Highway 602-2 ===
Louisiana Highway 602-2
- Location: Mound
- Length: 0.935 mi (1,505 m)
- Existed: 2013–present

Louisiana Highway 602-2 (LA 602-2) (0.935 miles or 1.505 kilometres) runs inside Mound between I-20's exit 182 and US 82.

Major intersections

The entire highway is in Mound, Madison Parish.

mi	km	Destinations	Notes
0.000	0.000	Former LA Highway 602 north to LA 602-1 – Richmond	Southern terminus; road continues as Former LA Highway 602; former LA 602 west
0.060– 0.485	0.097– 0.781	I-20 – Monroe, Vicksburg	I-20 exit 182
0.935	1.505	US 80 – Tallulah, Delta	Northern terminus
1.000 mi = 1.609 km; 1.000 km = 0.621 mi: Route transition

== Louisiana Highway 603 ==
Louisiana Highway 603
- Location: Quimby–Richmond
- Length: 19.34 mi (31.12 km)

Louisiana Highway 603 (LA 603) runs 19.34 miles (31.12 km) from Quimby to Richmond.

== Louisiana Highway 604 ==
Louisiana Highway 604
- Location: St. Joseph–Lake Bruin
- Length: 9.22 mi (14.84 km)

Louisiana Highway 604 (LA 604) runs 9.22 miles (14.84 km) from St. Joseph to Lake Bruin.

== Louisiana Highway 605 ==
Louisiana Highway 605
- Location: St. Joseph–Somerset
- Length: 19.63 mi (31.59 km)
- Existed: 1955–present

Louisiana Highway 605 (LA 605) runs 19.63 miles (31.59 km) in a north–south direction from the junction of LA 128 and LA 897-1 in St. Joseph to US 65 north of Newellton, Tensas Parish.

LA 605 heads north from St. Joseph following the shoreline of Lake Bruin, an oxbow lake of the Mississippi River. The highway intersects LA 607 and LA 604 as it breaks away from the lake to the northeast. It then intersects LA 608 and turns northwest, continuing the route of that highway along Lake St. Joseph, a second oxbow lake. Passing through the town of Newellton, LA 605 intersects LA 4 and LA 887. Following a turn to the north at Balmoral, the highway ends at an intersection with US 65.

The entire highway is in Tensas Parish.

Location	mi	km	Destinations	Notes
St. Joseph	0.0	0.0	LA 128 west / LA 897-1 south (Plank Road)	Southern terminus of LA 605; eastern terminus of LA 128; northern terminus of LA 897-1
	1.4	2.3	LA 604 north	Southern terminus of LA 604
Lake Bruin	7.0	11.3	LA 607 west to US 65	Eastern terminus of LA 607
	7.7	12.4	LA 604 south	Northern terminus of LA 604
	10.5	16.9	LA 608 north	Southern terminus of LA 608
Newellton	13.1	21.1	LA 4 west (Verona Street)	Eastern terminus of LA 4
Newellton	13.4	21.6	LA 887 east	Western terminus of LA 887
Balmoral	16.3	26.2	LA 888 north	Southern terminus of LA 888
Balmoral	16.5	26.6	LA 608 south	Northern terminus of LA 608
	19.8	31.9	US 65	Northern terminus
1.000 mi = 1.609 km; 1.000 km = 0.621 mi

== Louisiana Highway 606 ==
Louisiana Highway 606
- Location: Lake Bruin
- Length: 10.32 mi (16.61 km)

Louisiana Highway 606 (LA 606) runs 10.32 miles (16.61 km) at Lake Bruin.

== Louisiana Highway 607 ==
Louisiana Highway 607
- Location: Lake Bruin
- Length: 0.19 mi (310 m)
- Existed: 1955–present

Louisiana Highway 607 (LA 607) runs 0.19 miles (0.31 km) in an east–west direction from US 65 to LA 605 north of Lake Bruin, Tensas Parish.

The route serves as a short connector, providing access to Lake Bruin from US 65. LA 607 is located roughly midway between St. Joseph and Newellton. It is an undivided two-lane highway for its entire length.

The entire route is in Tensas Parish.

mi	km	Destinations	Notes
0.00	0.00	US 65 – Ferriday, Tallulah	Western terminus
0.19	0.31	LA 605 – Lake Bruin	Eastern terminus
1.000 mi = 1.609 km; 1.000 km = 0.621 mi

== Louisiana Highway 608 ==
Louisiana Highway 608
- Location: Lake St. Joseph–Balmoral
- Length: 21.77 mi (35.04 km)

Louisiana Highway 608 (LA 608) runs 21.77 miles (35.04 km) from Lake St. Joseph to Balmoral.

== Louisiana Highway 609 ==
Louisiana Highway 609
- Location: Dunn
- Length: 3.76 mi (6.05 km)

Louisiana Highway 609 (LA 609) runs 3.76 miles (6.05 km) in Dunn.

== Louisiana Highway 610 ==
Louisiana Highway 610
- Location: Swampers
- Length: 9.79 mi (15.76 km)

Louisiana Highway 610 (LA 610) runs 9.79 miles (15.76 km) in Swampers.

== Louisiana Highway 611 ==
Louisiana Highway 611
- Location: Jefferson–Metairie–New Orleans
- Length: 6.40 mi (10.30 km)

Louisiana Highway 611 (LA 611) is a collection of three current and ten former state-maintained streets in Jefferson, Metairie, and New Orleans. All thirteen routes were established with the 1955 Louisiana Highway renumbering.

== Louisiana Highway 612 ==
Louisiana Highway 612
- Location: Bossier City–Sligo
- Length: 3.60 mi (5.79 km)

Louisiana Highway 612 (LA 612) runs 3.60 miles (5.79 km) from Bossier City to Sligo.

== Louisiana Highway 613 ==
Louisiana Highway 613
- Location: Metairie–New Orleans
- Length: 5.2 mi (8.4 km)
- Existed: 1955–2010

Louisiana Highway 613 (LA 613) was a collection of four state-maintained streets in Metairie and New Orleans established with the 1955 Louisiana Highway renumbering. All four routes have since been deleted from the state highway system.

== Louisiana Highway 614 ==
Louisiana Highway 614
- Location: Haughton
- Length: 5.71 mi (9.19 km)

Louisiana Highway 614 (LA 614) runs 5.71 miles (9.19 km) in Haughton.

== Louisiana Highway 615 ==
Louisiana Highway 615
- Location: Shongaloo–Haynesville
- Length: 10.34 mi (16.64 km)
- Existed: 1955–present

Louisiana Highway 615 (LA 615) runs 10.34 miles (16.64 km) in an east–west direction from a junction with LA 157 and LA 159 north of Shongaloo, Webster Parish to US 79 in Haynesville, Claiborne Parish.

== Louisiana Highway 616 ==
Louisiana Highway 616
- Location: Claiborne–West Monroe
- Length: 6.20 mi (9.98 km)

Louisiana Highway 616 (LA 616) runs 6.20 miles (9.98 km) from Claiborne to West Monroe.

== Louisiana Highway 617 ==
Louisiana Highway 617
- Location: West Monroe
- Length: 3.33 mi (5.36 km)

Louisiana Highway 617 (LA 617) runs 3.33 miles (5.36 km) in West Monroe.

== Louisiana Highway 618 ==
Louisiana Highway 618
- Location: Winnsboro
- Length: 5.92 mi (9.53 km)

Louisiana Highway 618 (LA 618) runs 5.92 miles (9.53 km) in Winnsboro.

== Louisiana Highway 619 ==
Louisiana Highway 619
- Location: Shell Beach
- Length: 2.2 mi (3.5 km)
- Existed: 1955–1960

Louisiana Highway 619 (LA 619) was a state highway that served St. Bernard Parish. It spanned 2.2 miles (3.5 km) in a west to east direction along the shore of Lake Borgne near what is now known as Old Shell Beach.

== Louisiana Highway 620 ==
Louisiana Highway 620
- Location: West Baton Rouge Parish
- Length: 7.06 mi (11.36 km)
- Existed: 1955–present

Louisiana Highway 620 (LA 620) runs 7.06 miles (11.36 km) in an east–west direction from LA 413 in Erwinville to LA 415 northwest of Port Allen, West Baton Rouge Parish.

LA 620 heads due east from LA 413, just north of the latter's intersection with the concurrent US 190 and LA 1 in Erwinville. LA 620 intersects three minor state routes (LA 3091, LA 984, and LA 983) before terminating at LA 415 (River Road) in an area known as Smithfield. LA 620 is an undivided two-lane highway for its entire length.

Before the 1955 Louisiana Highway renumbering, LA 620 was part of State Route 30.

The entire highway is in West Baton Rouge Parish.

Location	mi	km	Destinations	Notes
Erwinville	0.0	0.0	LA 413 (Poydras Bayou Road)	Western terminus
	1.0	1.6	LA 3091 (Flynn Road)	Southern terminus of LA 3091
	2.5	4.0	LA 984 (Rougon Road)	Southern terminus of LA 984
	4.9	7.9	LA 983 (Bueche Road)	
Smithfield	7.0	11.3	LA 415 (River Road)	Eastern terminus
1.000 mi = 1.609 km; 1.000 km = 0.621 mi

== Louisiana Highway 621 ==
Louisiana Highway 621
- Location: Prairieville–Brignac
- Length: 6.81 mi (10.96 km)
- Existed: 1955–present

Louisiana Highway 621 (LA 621) runs 6.81 miles (10.96 km) in an east–west direction from LA 73 in Prairieville to LA 431 at Brignac, Ascension Parish.

The route heads east from LA 73 (Old Jefferson Highway) adjacent to I-10 Exit 173. It crosses both US 61 (Airline Highway) and LA 44 (North Burnside Avenue) north of Gonzales before ending at LA 431 in an area known as Brignac. LA 621 is an undivided two-lane highway for its entire length.

The entire highway is in Ascension Parish.

Location	mi	km	Destinations	Notes
Prairieville	0.0	0.0	LA 73 (Old Jefferson Highway) to I-10 – Baton Rouge, New Orleans	Western terminus
Duplessis	2.6	4.2	US 61 (Airline Highway) – Baton Rouge, New Orleans	
	3.8	6.1	LA 44 (North Burnside Avenue)	
Brignac	6.8	10.9	LA 431 (Brittany–Port Vincent Highway)	Eastern terminus
1.000 mi = 1.609 km; 1.000 km = 0.621 mi

== Louisiana Highway 622 ==
Louisiana Highway 622
- Location: Mangham
- Length: 4.83 mi (7.77 km)

Louisiana Highway 622 (LA 622) runs 4.83 miles (7.77 km) in Mangham.

== Louisiana Highway 623 ==
Louisiana Highway 623
- Location: Ball
- Length: 4.94 mi (7.95 km)

Louisiana Highway 623 (LA 623) runs 4.94 miles (7.95 km) in Ball.

== Louisiana Highway 624 ==
Louisiana Highway 624
- Location: Yscloskey–Hopedale
- Length: 5.80 mi (9.33 km)
- Existed: 1955–present

Louisiana Highway 624 (LA 624) runs 5.80 miles (9.33 km) in an east–west direction from LA 46 in Yscloskey to a point near the Mississippi River Gulf Outlet Canal east of Hopedale, St. Bernard Parish.

The route heads southeast from Yscloskey, running along the north bank of Bayou La Loutre. After passing through Hopedale, LA 624 curves to the northeast with the bayou and proceeds 1.5 miles (2.4 km) to the end of state maintenance. A local road continues a short distance to a dead end at the Mississippi River Gulf Outlet Canal. LA 624 is an undivided two-lane highway for its entire length.

The entire highway is in St. Bernard Parish.

Location	mi	km	Destinations	Notes
Yscloskey	0.0	0.0	LA 46 (Hopedale Highway, Florissant Highway) – Shell Beach, New Orleans	Western terminus
	5.8	9.3	End state maintenance southwest of Mississippi River Gulf Outlet Canal	Eastern terminus
1.000 mi = 1.609 km; 1.000 km = 0.621 mi

== Louisiana Highway 625 ==
Louisiana Highway 625
- Location: Yscloskey
- Length: 0.25 mi (400 m)
- Existed: 1955–present

Louisiana Highway 625 (LA 625) runs 0.25 miles (0.40 km) in an east–west direction along Maple Street in Yscloskey, St. Bernard Parish.

The route begins at LA 46 (Florissant Highway), which runs along Bayou La Loutre. It then curves to the southeast to a dead end at Bayou Yscloskey. It is an undivided, two-lane highway for its entire length.

In the pre-1955 state highway system, LA 625 was designated as State Route C-2073. LA 625 was created in the 1955 Louisiana Highway renumbering, its western end following a slightly different connection to LA 46.

The entire highway is in Yscloskey, St. Bernard Parish.

mi	km	Destinations	Notes
0.00	0.00	LA 46 (Florissant Highway)	Western terminus
0.25	0.40	Dead end at Bayou Yscloskey	Eastern terminus
1.000 mi = 1.609 km; 1.000 km = 0.621 mi

== Louisiana Highway 626 ==
Louisiana Highway 626
- Location: St. Rose–Destrehan
- Length: 2.56 mi (4.12 km)
- Existed: 1955–present

Louisiana Highway 626 (LA 626) runs 2.56 miles (4.12 km) in a north–south direction along St. Rose Avenue from LA 48 in St. Rose to US 61 at the northeast corner of Destrehan, St. Charles Parish.

The route connects the community of St. Rose with US 61 (Airline Highway) west of New Orleans. Along its short route, LA 626 crosses both the Canadian National Railway (CN) and Kansas City Southern Railway (KCS) tracks at grade. It also crosses under but does not intersect I-310. LA 626 is an undivided two-lane highway for its entire length.

The entire highway is in St. Charles Parish.

Location	mi	km	Destinations	Notes
St. Rose	0.0	0.0	LA 48 (River Road) – Destrehan, Mississippi River Bridge, Luling	Southern terminus
Destrehan	2.6	4.2	US 61 (Airline Highway) – New Orleans, Baton Rouge	Northern terminus
1.000 mi = 1.609 km; 1.000 km = 0.621 mi

== Louisiana Highway 627 ==
Louisiana Highway 627
- Location: Norco
- Length: 1.14 mi (1.83 km)
- Existed: 1955–present

Louisiana Highway 627 (LA 627) runs 1.14 miles (1.83 km) in a north–south direction along Prospect Avenue in Norco, St. Charles Parish.

The route connects US 61 (Airline Highway) with LA 48 (River Road) in an area known as Good Hope. It travels through the Valero and Shell–Motiva oil refineries, crossing both the Canadian National Railway (CN) and Kansas City Southern Railway (KCS) tracks at grade. LA 627 is an undivided two-lane highway for its entire length.

In the pre-1955 state highway system, LA 627 was designated as State Route 682. LA 627 was created in the 1955 Louisiana Highway renumbering, connecting to LA 48 at a slightly different location. In the early 2000s, the southern portion of LA 627 was re-routed from Prospect Avenue onto a parallel road formerly known as Garrison Street. The original route is now signed as "Old Prospect."

The entire highway is in Norco, St. Charles Parish.

mi	km	Destinations	Notes
0.0	0.0	LA 48 (River Road) – Norco, Destrehan	Southern terminus; location also known as Good Hope
1.1	1.8	US 61 (Airline Highway) – New Orleans, Baton Rouge	Northern terminus
1.000 mi = 1.609 km; 1.000 km = 0.621 mi

== Louisiana Highway 628 ==
Louisiana Highway 628
- Location: LaPlace–Montz
- Length: 8.04 mi (12.94 km)
- Existed: 1955–present

Louisiana Highway 628 (LA 628) runs 8.04 miles (12.94 km) in a general east–west direction from LA 44 in LaPlace, St. John the Baptist Parish to US 61 in Montz, St. Charles Parish.

The route heads southeast along East 5th Street from LA 44 (Main Street) in LaPlace. It approaches and begins to run alongside the east bank levee of the Mississippi River, where it becomes known as River Road. LA 628 intersects LA 636-1 (McReine Road) and LA 3217, two short connectors to the parallel US 61. The highway then crosses from St. John the Baptist Parish into the St. Charles Parish community of Montz. Reaching the Upper Guide Levee of the Bonnet Carré Spillway, LA 628 turns away from the river and heads northeast on C.C. Road. It parallels the spillway levee to its terminus at US 61 (Airline Highway). LA 628 is an undivided two-lane highway for its entire length.

Parish	Location	mi	km	Destinations	Notes
St. John the Baptist	LaPlace	0.0	0.0	LA 44 (West 5th Street, Main Street)	Western terminus
St. John the Baptist	LaPlace	0.1	0.16	LA 636-3 west (Cardinal Street)	Eastern terminus of LA 636-3
St. John the Baptist	LaPlace	1.1	1.8	LA 636-1 north (McReine Road)	Southern terminus of LA 636-1
St. John the Baptist	LaPlace	2.0	3.2	LA 3217 north	Southern terminus of LA 3217
St. Charles	Montz	8.0	12.9	US 61 (Airline Highway) – New Orleans, Baton Rouge	Eastern terminus
1.000 mi = 1.609 km; 1.000 km = 0.621 mi

== Louisiana Highway 629 ==
Louisiana Highway 629
- Location: Killona
- Length: 0.67 mi (1,080 m)
- Existed: 1955–1960s

Louisiana Highway 629 (LA 629) ran 0.67 miles (1.08 km) in a north–south direction along Killona Drive in Killona, St. Charles Parish.

The route headed southwest from LA 18 (River Road), which runs along the Mississippi River, to a crossing of the Texas & Pacific Railroad (now the Union Pacific Railroad) tracks on Killona Drive. It was an undivided, two-lane highway for its entire length.

In the pre-1955 state highway system, LA 629 was designated as State Route 659. LA 629 was created with the 1955 Louisiana Highway renumbering and deleted sometime in the 1960s. Today a similar route, LA 3141 (Mary Plantation Road), parallels and extends beyond Killona Drive, connecting LA 18 with LA 3127, a bypass of LA 18 that was constructed in the 1970s.

The entire highway was in Killona, St. Charles Parish.

mi	km	Destinations	Notes
0.00	0.00	Begin state maintenance at Texas & Pacific Railroad crossing	Southern terminus
0.67	1.08	LA 18 (River Road) – Donaldsonville, Luling	Northern terminus
1.000 mi = 1.609 km; 1.000 km = 0.621 mi

== Louisiana Highway 630 ==
Louisiana Highway 630
- Location: Hahnville
- Length: 0.94 mi (1,510 m)
- Existed: 1955–c. 1957

Louisiana Highway 630 (LA 630) ran 0.94 miles (1.51 km) in a west–east direction along Courthouse Lane in Hahnville, St. Charles Parish.

The route headed southwest from LA 18 (River Road), which runs along the Mississippi River, made a zigzag around the St. Charles Parish courthouse, and continued to the Texas & Pacific Railroad (now the Union Pacific Railroad) tracks. It was an undivided, two-lane highway for its entire length.

In the pre-1955 state highway system, LA 630 was designated as State Route 660. LA 630 was created with the 1955 Louisiana Highway renumbering and deleted by 1958. Today a similar route, LA 3160 (Home Place), parallels and extends beyond Courthouse Lane, connecting LA 18 with LA 3127, a bypass of LA 18 that was constructed in the 1970s.

The entire highway was in Hahnville, St. Charles Parish.

mi	km	Destinations	Notes
0.00	0.00	Begin state maintenance at Texas & Pacific Railroad tracks	Western terminus
0.94	1.51	LA 18 (River Road) – Donaldsonville, Luling	Eastern terminus
1.000 mi = 1.609 km; 1.000 km = 0.621 mi

== Louisiana Highway 631 ==
Louisiana Highway 631
- Location: Des Allemands–Boutte
- Length: 9.0 mi (14.5 km)
- Existed: 1955–present

Louisiana Highway 631 (LA 631) runs 9.0 miles (14.5 km) in a southwest to northeast direction from US 90 in Des Allemands to LA 52 in Boutte.

LA 631 follows the original route of US 90 before the parallel four-lane alignment was constructed. It begins in extreme eastern Lafourche Parish and crosses Bayou Des Allemands in the community of Des Allemands. The route then heads northeast through St. Charles Parish through the community of Paradis. Just before reaching its terminus at LA 52 in Boutte, LA 631 crosses underneath I-310. LA 631 is an undivided two lane highway for its entire length.

The route has a spur that travels 0.5 miles (0.80 km) to a junction with US 90 in Des Allemands, providing access from the main highway to the small business district.

Parish	Location	mi	km	Destinations	Notes
Lafourche	Des Allemands	0.0	0.0	US 90 – New Orleans, Morgan City	Western terminus
Lafourche–St. Charles parish line	Des Allemands	0.5	0.80	Bridge over Bayou Des Allemands	
St. Charles	Des Allemands	0.8	1.3	LA 631 Spur (Old US 90)	Western terminus of LA 631 Spur
St. Charles	Des Allemands	1.2	1.9	LA 632 (Levee Road)	Western terminus of LA 632
St. Charles	Paradis	3.4	5.5	LA 635	Western terminus of LA 635
St. Charles	Paradis	5.3	8.5	LA 306 (Bayou Gauche Road)	Northern terminus of LA 306
St. Charles	Boutte	9.0	14.5	LA 52 (Paul Maillard Road)	Eastern terminus
1.000 mi = 1.609 km; 1.000 km = 0.621 mi

== Louisiana Highway 632 ==
Louisiana Highway 632
- Location: Des Allemands–Bayou Gauche
- Length: 5.63 mi (9.06 km)
- Existed: 1955–present

Louisiana Highway 632 (LA 632) runs 5.63 miles (9.06 km) in a general east–west direction from LA 631 in Des Allemands to a dead end at the Paradis Canal in Bayou Gauche, St. Charles Parish.

The route heads southeast along Levee Road and crosses both LA 631 Spur (Old US 90) and current US 90 in Des Allemands. Now known as WPA Road, LA 632 turns due east into an area known as Bayou Gauche and intersects LA 306 (Bayou Gauche Road). LA 632 turns north and runs concurrently with LA 306 for a short distance before turning east onto Grand Bayou Road, which it follows to a dead end at the Paradis Canal. LA 632 is an undivided two-lane highway for its entire length.

The entire highway is in St. Charles Parish.

Location	mi	km	Destinations	Notes
Des Allemands	0.0	0.0	LA 631 (Old Spanish Trail)	Western terminus
Des Allemands	0.2	0.32	LA 631 Spur (Old US 90)	
Des Allemands	0.3	0.48	US 90 – New Orleans, Morgan City	
Bayou Gauche	3.2	5.1	LA 306 south (Bayou Gauche Road)	West end of LA 306 concurrency
Bayou Gauche	3.8	6.1	LA 306 north (Bayou Gauche Road)	East end of LA 306 concurrency
Bayou Gauche	5.6	9.0	Dead end at Paradis Canal	Eastern terminus
1.000 mi = 1.609 km; 1.000 km = 0.621 mi: Concurrency terminus

== Louisiana Highway 633 ==
Louisiana Highway 633
- Location: Boutte
- Length: 2.78 mi (4.47 km)
- Existed: 1955–present

Louisiana Highway 633 (LA 633) runs 2.78 miles (4.47 km) in a north–south direction along Magnolia Ridge Road from a local road at Grand Bayou to a junction with US 90 and LA 52 in Boutte, St. Charles Parish. It is an undivided two-lane highway for its entire length.

The entire highway is in St. Charles Parish.

Location	mi	km	Destinations	Notes
	0.0	0.0	Local road at Grand Bayou	Southern terminus
Boutte	2.8	4.5	US 90 – New Orleans, Houma; LA 52 (Paul Maillard Road) – Luling	Northern terminus; southern terminus of LA 52
1.000 mi = 1.609 km; 1.000 km = 0.621 mi

== Louisiana Highway 634 ==
Louisiana Highway 634
- Location: Des Allemands
- Length: 0.25 mi (400 m)
- Existed: 1955–c. 1960s

Louisiana Highway 634 (LA 634) ran 0.25 miles (0.40 km) in a west–east direction along J.B. Green Road in Des Allemands, St. Charles Parish.

The route connected US 90 and its former alignment, LA 631 (Old Spanish Trail). It was an undivided, two-lane highway for its entire length.

In the pre-1955 state highway system, LA 634 was designated as State Route C-1522. LA 634 was created with the 1955 Louisiana Highway renumbering and deleted sometime in the 1960s. However, a similar connector road to the north, LA 635 (formerly State Route C-1520), remains.

The entire highway was in Des Allemands, St. Charles Parish.

mi	km	Destinations	Notes
0.00	0.00	LA 631 (Old Spanish Trail) – Des Allemands, Paradis	Western terminus
0.25	0.40	US 90 – New Orleans, Houma	Eastern terminus
1.000 mi = 1.609 km; 1.000 km = 0.621 mi

== Louisiana Highway 635 ==
Louisiana Highway 635
- Location: Des Allemands
- Length: 0.26 mi (420 m)
- Existed: 1955–present

Louisiana Highway 635 (LA 635) runs 0.26 miles (0.42 km) in an east–west direction north of Des Allemands, St. Charles Parish.

The route connects US 90 and its former alignment, LA 631 (Old Spanish Trail) between Des Allemands and Paradis. It is an undivided two-lane highway for its entire length.

In the pre-1955 state highway system, LA 635 was designated as State Route C-1520. LA 635 was created in the 1955 Louisiana Highway renumbering following a different connector road immediately to the north that no longer exists. A similar connector road to the south, LA 634 (formerly State Route C-1522), was also part of the state highway system until its deletion in the 1960s.

The entire highway is in Des Allemands, St. Charles Parish.

mi	km	Destinations	Notes
0.00	0.00	LA 631 (Old Spanish Trail)	Western terminus
0.26	0.42	US 90 – New Orleans, Houma	Eastern terminus
1.000 mi = 1.609 km; 1.000 km = 0.621 mi

== Louisiana Highway 636 ==
Louisiana Highway 636
- Location: LaPlace
- Length: 2.40 mi (3.86 km)
- Existed: 1955–present

Louisiana Highway 636 (LA 636) is the designation for a pair of state highways composing of LA 636-1 and LA 636-3 that serve Laplace, St. John the Baptist Parish, Louisiana. LA 636-1 is 0.74 miles (1.19 km) long and runs from LA 628 (East 5th Street) east to US 61 (Airline Highway). LA 636-3 begins at LA 44 adjacent to a Mississippi River levee and mostly runs east along this levee to LA 628 and Cardinal Street. This segment is 1.66 miles (2.67 km) long.

== Louisiana Highway 637 ==
Louisiana Highway 637
- Location: Reserve
- Length: 1.48 mi (2.38 km)
- Existed: 1955–present

Louisiana Highway 637 (LA 637) runs 1.48 miles (2.38 km) in a north–south direction along West 10th Street from LA 44 (River Road) to US 61 (Airline Highway) in Reserve, St. John the Baptist Parish. It is an undivided two-lane highway for its entire length.

The entire highway is in Reserve, St. John the Baptist Parish.

mi	km	Destinations	Notes
0.0	0.0	LA 44 (River Road) – LaPlace, Garyville	Southern terminus
1.5	2.4	US 61 (Airline Highway) – New Orleans, Baton Rouge	Northern terminus
1.000 mi = 1.609 km; 1.000 km = 0.621 mi

== Louisiana Highway 639 ==
Louisiana Highway 639
- Location: St. John the Baptist Parish
- Length: 0.40 mi (640 m)
- Existed: 1955–present

Louisiana Highway 639 (LA 639) runs 0.40 miles (0.64 km) in a north–south direction off of LA 18 west of Edgard, St. John the Baptist Parish.

LA 639 is a short and lightly traveled local road that begins just north of the Union Pacific Railroad track and continues northward to LA 18 (River Road). Its only major feature is the old Johnson (later renamed Carroll) Plantation, in which a few slave cabins and an overseer's house remain. The route has been unsigned in recent years.

The entire highway is in St. John the Baptist Parish.

Location	mi	km	Destinations	Notes
Johnson	0.0	0.0	Begin state maintenance north of the Union Pacific Railroad tracks	Southern terminus
	0.4	0.64	LA 18 (River Road)	Northern terminus
1.000 mi = 1.609 km; 1.000 km = 0.621 mi

== Louisiana Highway 640 ==
Louisiana Highway 640
- Location: Edgard–Reserve
- Length: 2.37 mi (3.81 km)
- Existed: 1955–present

Louisiana Highway 640 (LA 640) runs 2.37 miles (3.81 km) in a north–south direction from LA 3127 in Edgard to a concurrency with LA 18 (River Road). Until 2013, it included a Mississippi River ferry crossing to the junction of LA 44 and LA 53 in Reserve, St. John the Baptist Parish.

LA 640 heads north from LA 3127 near West St. John High School. It intersects LA 18 (River Road) near the St. John the Baptist Parish Courthouse, and had run 0.3 mi west along LA 18 to a ferry road. Until 2013, it crossed the river via the Edgard-Reserve Ferry. LA 640 had ended at the east bank river road (LA 44) at an intersection with LA 53. It is an undivided two-lane highway for its entire length.

The entire highway is in St. John the Baptist Parish.

Location	mi	km	Destinations	Notes
Edgard	0.0	0.0	LA 3127	Southern terminus
Edgard	2.1	3.4	LA 18 east (River Road)	South end of LA 18 concurrency
Edgard	2.2	3.5	LA 18 west (River Road)	North end of LA 18 concurrency
Mississippi River			Edgard-Reserve Ferry	
Reserve	2.2	3.5	LA 44 (River Road/Jefferson Highway) LA 53 north (Central Avenue)	Northern terminus
1.000 mi = 1.609 km; 1.000 km = 0.621 mi: Concurrency terminus

== Louisiana Highway 641 ==
Louisiana Highway 641
- Location: Lutcher–Gramercy
- Length: 6.9 mi (11.1 km)

Louisiana Highway 641 (LA 641) is a state highway in Louisiana that serves St. James Parish. It travels 6.9 miles (11.1 km) in the shape of a capital J, starting northwest, veering northeast, and then turning north, serving the communities of Lutcher and Gramercy and providing a connection to Interstate 10 (I-10) for those towns.

== Louisiana Highway 642 ==
Louisiana Highway 642
- Location: Remy–Grand Point
- Length: 3.75 mi (6.04 km)
- Existed: 1955–present

Louisiana Highway 642 (LA 642) runs 3.75 miles (6.04 km) in a north–south direction from LA 44 at Remy to the end of state maintenance in Grand Point, St. James Parish.

The route heads north from LA 44 at the east bank levee of the Mississippi River and crosses the Canadian National Railway (CN) tracks at grade. 1.3 miles (2.1 km) later, LA 642 intersects LA 3125. It then zigzags to the west and north through an area known as Grand Point. At the end of its route, the highway turns east and becomes a dirt road. State maintenance ends shortly afterward as the road turns again to the north, the local road reaching a boat launch on Blind River. LA 642 is an undivided two-lane highway for its entire length.

The entire highway is in St. James Parish.

Location	mi	km	Destinations	Notes
Remy	0.0	0.0	LA 44 – Gramercy, Lutcher, Convent	Southern terminus
	1.4	2.3	LA 3125 – Gramercy, Lutcher	
Grand Point	3.9	6.3	End state maintenance northeast of C. Louque Street, a local road	Northern terminus
1.000 mi = 1.609 km; 1.000 km = 0.621 mi

== Louisiana Highway 643 ==
Louisiana Highway 643
- Location: St. James Parish
- Length: 2.854 mi (4.593 km)
- Existed: 1955–present

Louisiana Highway 643 (LA 643) runs 2.85 miles (4.59 km) in a general east–west direction from LA 20 to the St. James–St. John the Baptist parish line in an area known as Lower Vacherie. It is an undivided two-lane highway for its entire length.

The route once continued further east to a dead end at Lac Des Allemands, but this portion was transferred to local control in 2018 as part of La DOTD's Road Transfer program.

Parish	Location	mi	km	Destinations	Notes
St. James	Lower Vacherie	0.000– 0.069	0.000– 0.111	LA 20 – Vacherie, Thibodaux	Western terminus
St. James	Lower Vacherie	1.521	2.448	LA 644	Eastern terminus of LA 644
St. James–St. John the Baptist parish line		2.854	4.593	End state maintenance	Eastern terminus
1.000 mi = 1.609 km; 1.000 km = 0.621 mi

== Louisiana Highway 644 ==
Louisiana Highway 644
- Location: Lower Vacherie
- Length: 1.76 mi (2.83 km)
- Existed: 1955–present

Louisiana Highway 644 (LA 644) runs 1.76 miles (2.83 km) in a general east–west direction from LA 20 to LA 643 in Lower Vacherie, St. James Parish.

The route heads eastward through Lower Vacherie from LA 20. After 1.3 miles (2.1 km), it turns to the south and ends at an intersection with LA 643, which continues in a general eastward direction to nearby Lac Des Allemands. LA 644 is an undivided two-lane highway for its entire length.

The entire highway is in Lower Vacherie, St. James Parish.

mi	km	Destinations	Notes
0.0	0.0	LA 20 – Vacherie, Thibodaux	Western terminus
1.8	2.9	LA 643 – Lac Des Allemands	Eastern terminus
1.000 mi = 1.609 km; 1.000 km = 0.621 mi

== Louisiana Highway 645 ==
Louisiana Highway 645
- Location: Labadieville
- Length: 2.25 mi (3.62 km)

Louisiana Highway 645 (LA 645) runs 2.25 miles (3.62 km) in Labadieville.

== Louisiana Highway 646 ==
Louisiana Highway 646
- Location: Laurel Grove
- Length: 3.3 mi (5.3 km)
- Existed: 1955–1975

Louisiana Highway 646 (LA 646) was a state highway that served Lafourche Parish. It spanned a total of 3.3 miles (5.3 km) along French Plantation Road and Little Choupic Road west of Thibodaux, near the Lafourche-Assumption parish line.

== Louisiana Highway 647 ==
Louisiana Highway 647
- Location: Chackbay–Choctaw
- Length: 8.3 mi (13.4 km)
- Existed: 1955–1964

Louisiana Highway 647 (LA 647) ran 8.3 miles (13.4 km) in a northwest to southeast direction from LA 20 in Chackbay (shown as Chegby on maps of the time) to Sanchez Road, a local road in an area known as Choctaw.

LA 647 was an undivided two-lane highway for its entire length.

The entire highway was in Lafourche Parish.

Location	mi	km	Destinations	Notes
Chegby	0.0	0.0	LA 20 – Thibodaux, Vacherie	Western terminus
Choctaw	8.3	13.4	End state maintenance east of Sanchez Road	Eastern terminus
1.000 mi = 1.609 km; 1.000 km = 0.621 mi

== Louisiana Highway 648 ==
Louisiana Highway 648
- Location: Thibodaux
- Length: 2.343 mi (3.771 km)
- Existed: 1955–present

Louisiana Highway 648 (LA 648) runs 2.34 miles (3.77 km) in a southwest to northeast direction from LA 20 south of Thibodaux to LA 308 east of Thibodaux.

LA 648 heads east from LA 20 on Percy Brown Road, crossing from Terrebonne Parish into Lafourche Parish. It immediately turns to the northeast and briefly passes through the southeast corner of Thibodaux. At the end of its route, LA 648 intersects LA 1, crosses a bridge over Bayou Lafourche, and terminates immediately afterward at LA 308, which follows the opposite bank. LA 648 is an undivided two-lane highway for its entire length.

The entire above route appears on current La DOTD maps as LA 648 and is signed accordingly in the field; however, the departmental GIS and LRS systems still show most of the route under its former designation of LA 648 Spur. Prior to the 2000s, LA 648 turned northwest from Percy Brown Road onto Acadia Road in Thibodaux and headed back to a terminus at LA 20, existing as a short loop off of that highway. The remainder of Percy Brown Road running northeast to LA 308 was designated as LA 648 Spur, now absorbed by the main route.

Parish	Location	mi	km	Destinations	Notes
Terrebonne		0.000	0.000	LA 20 (West Main Street, West Park Avenue)	Western terminus
Lafourche	Thibodaux	0.963	1.550	North Acadia Road	Official mile 0.000 of LA 648 Spur
Lafourche		2.260	3.637	LA 1 – Thibodaux, Raceland	
Lafourche		2.271– 2.317	3.655– 3.729	Bridge over Bayou Lafourche	
Lafourche		2.343	3.771	LA 308	Eastern terminus; official mile 1.380 of LA 648 Spur
1.000 mi = 1.609 km; 1.000 km = 0.621 mi

== Louisiana Highway 649 ==
Louisiana Highway 649
- Location: St. Charles
- Length: 0.07 mi (110 m)
- Existed: 1955–present

Louisiana Highway 649 (LA 649) consists of a swing bridge across Bayou Lafourche in St. Charles, Lafourche Parish.

The route is 0.07 miles (0.11 km) long, connecting LA 1 and LA 308 which run along the west and east banks of the bayou, respectively. It is an undivided two-lane highway for its entire length.

In the pre-1955 state highway system, LA 649 was designated as State Route C-2137. LA 649 was created in the 1955 Louisiana Highway renumbering and was originally routed across a now-demolished bridge located 0.4 miles (0.64 km) downstream from the current bridge. The St. Charles Swing Bridge was constructed in 1996 and aligned with the St. Charles Bypass Road that provides a shortcut to LA 24 south of Thibodaux.

The entire highway is in St. Charles, Lafourche Parish.

mi	km	Destinations	Notes
0.00	0.00	LA 1 – Thibodaux, Raceland	Southern terminus
0.07	0.11	LA 308 – Thibodaux, Raceland	Northern terminus
1.000 mi = 1.609 km; 1.000 km = 0.621 mi
