= Louisiana Highway 619 =

State highway in Louisiana, United States

Louisiana Highway 619
- LA 619 highlighted in red on a modern map

Route information
- Maintained by Louisiana DOTD
- Length: 2.2 mi (3.5 km)
- Existed: 1955 renumbering–1960

Major junctions
- West end: LA 46 in Shell Beach
- East end: Dead end near Doulluts Canal east of Shell Beach

Location
- Country: United States
- State: Louisiana
- Parishes: St. Bernard

Highway system
- Louisiana State Highway System; Interstate; US; State; Scenic
← LA 618	→ LA 620

Louisiana Highway 619 (LA 619) was a state highway that served St. Bernard Parish. It spanned 2.2 miles (3.5 km) in a west to east direction along the shore of Lake Borgne near what is now known as Old Shell Beach.

== Route description ==
From the west, LA 619 began at an intersection with LA 46 in Shell Beach and proceeded eastward along the south shore of Lake Borgne. It crossed a bridge over Doulluts Canal and reached its eastern terminus at a dead end shortly thereafter.

LA 619 was an undivided, two-lane highway for its entire length.

== History ==
Prior to the construction of the Mississippi River-Gulf Outlet Canal (MRGO) in the early 1960s, LA 46 continued past its present terminus to the shore of Lake Borgne at the original Shell Beach. Here, LA 619 began and proceeded to the east along the lake shore. The construction of the MRGO caused what is now known as Old Shell Beach to be separated from the mainland. As a result, LA 619 was abandoned, and LA 46 was shortened to its present terminus on the south side of the canal at the present Shell Beach.

LA 619 was designated as State Route C-1492 prior to the 1955 Louisiana Highway renumbering.

== Major intersections ==
The entire highway was in St. Bernard Parish.

Location	mi	km	Destinations	Notes
Shell Beach	0.0	0.0	LA 46	Western terminus
	1.6	2.6	Bridge over Doulluts Canal	
	2.2	3.5	Dead end east of Doulluts Canal	Eastern terminus
1.000 mi = 1.609 km; 1.000 km = 0.621 mi
