= Louisiana Highway 46 =

State highway in Louisiana, United States

Louisiana Highway 46

Route information
- Maintained by Louisiana DOTD
- Length: 29.5 mi (47.5 km)
- Existed: 1955 renumbering–present

Major junctions
- West end: LA 39 / LA 3021 in New Orleans
- East end: Dead end at Mississippi River-Gulf Outlet Canal in Shell Beach

Location
- Country: United States
- State: Louisiana
- Parishes: Orleans, St. Bernard

Highway system
- Louisiana State Highway System; Interstate; US; State; Scenic
← LA 45	→ LA 47

Louisiana Highway 46 (LA 46) is a state highway in Louisiana that serves Orleans and St. Bernard Parishes. It runs in a west to east direction for a total length of 29.5 miles (47.5 km). It is demarcated as Elysian Fields Avenue and St. Claude Avenue in the city of New Orleans and as St. Bernard Highway, Bayou Road, East Judge Perez Drive, Florissant Highway and Yscloskey Highway in St. Bernard Parish. The highway is recognized by the United States Department of Transportation as San Bernardo Scenic Byway.

== Route description ==
In New Orleans, LA 46 begins as Elysian Fields Avenue at an intersection with LA 39 (North Claiborne Avenue) and LA 3021 (Elysian Fields Avenue). After heading south five blocks, LA 46 turns onto St. Claude Avenue and heads east. It crosses the Industrial Canal via the St. Claude Avenue Bridge and runs through the city's Lower 9th Ward, continuing to parallel to the Mississippi River. Approximately one-half mile east of the Orleans-St. Bernard Parish line, LA 46 becomes St. Bernard Highway. Serving as the southernmost west–east thoroughfare of the parish, it intersects LA 47 (Paris Road) and LA 3238 (Palmisano Boulevard) in Chalmette. After continuing in a south-southeast direction, the highway turns east and again meets LA 39, which has turned west, at Bayou Road. The two highways run concurrently for two miles (3 km) near the end of East Judge Perez Drive, at which point LA 46 turns east through the community of Reggio and LA 300. From there, LA 46 connects to the towns of Yscloskey (via LA 625), Shell Beach, and Hopedale (via LA 624) before ending at a dead end with the Mississippi River-Gulf Outlet Canal.

LA 46 is a divided, four-lane highway from LA 39/LA 3021/North Claiborne Avenue to LA 47/Paris Road, where it narrows to an undivided, two-lane highway from LA 47/Paris Road to the westernmost intersection with the LA 300/Bayou Road. The route again widens to four lanes and becomes a divided highway from the westernmost intersection with the LA 300/Bayou Road to the easternmost intersection with LA 300/Bayou Road before narrowing again to an undivided, two-lane roadway from the easternmost intersection with LA 300/Bayou Road to the eastern terminus at Shell Beach.

== Major intersections ==
Parish	Location	mi	km	Destinations	Notes
Orleans	New Orleans	0.0	0.0	LA 39 (North Claiborne Avenue) LA 3021 north (Elysian Fields Avenue)	Western terminus; Southern terminus of LA 3021
Orleans	New Orleans	2.0	3.2	St. Claude Avenue Bridge over Industrial Canal	
St. Bernard	Chalmette	6.4	10.3	LA 47 north (Paris Road)	Southern terminus of LA 47; Chalmette Ferry landing to the south
St. Bernard	Poydras	13.8	22.2	LA 39 south (St. Bernard Parkway)	West end of LA 39 concurrency
St. Bernard	Sebastopol	15.0	24.1	LA 300 (Bayou Road) – Delacroix	Northwestern terminus of LA 300
St. Bernard		15.4	24.8	LA 39 north (East Judge Perez Drive) – Chalmette	East end of LA 39 concurrency
St. Bernard	Toca	17.7	28.5	LA 1245 south	Northern terminus of LA 1245
St. Bernard	Reggio	23.4	37.7	LA 300 (Florissant Highway / Delacroix Highway)	
St. Bernard	Alluvial City	27.6	44.4	LA 625 (Maple Street)	Western terminus of LA 625; Unsigned junction
St. Bernard	Yscloskey	28.1	45.2	Bridge over Bayou La Loutre	
St. Bernard	Yscloskey	28.1	45.2	LA 624 (Hopedale Highway) – Hopedale	Western terminus of LA 624
St. Bernard	Shell Beach	29.5	47.5	Dead end at Mississippi River-Gulf Outlet Canal	Eastern terminus
1.000 mi = 1.609 km; 1.000 km = 0.621 mi: Concurrency terminus
