= Fort Proctor =

- U.S. National Register of Historic Places
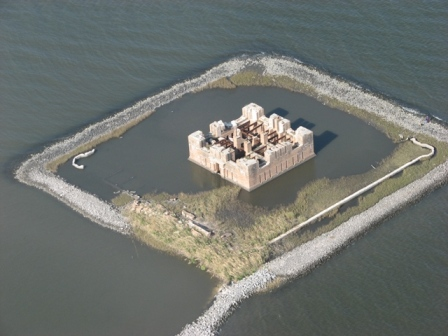
- Fort Proctor from 600 feet over Bayou Yscloskey, in 2008
- Nearest city: Shell Beach, Louisiana
- Coordinates: 29°52′2.3″N 89°40′41.82″W
- Built: 1856
- Architect: J.G. Totten, et al.
- Architectural style: Renaissance
- NRHP reference No.: 78003067
- Added to NRHP: September 20, 1978

Fort Proctor is a ruined 19th century fort in St. Bernard Parish, Louisiana, USA. It is also known as Fort Beauregard or Beauregard's Castle (after P.G.T. Beauregard, who supervised its construction with the architect J.G. Totten). The fort is on the shore of Lake Borgne just north of the mouth of Bayou Yscloskey. At the time it was built in the 1850s, there was also an adjacent railroad port called "Proctorville".

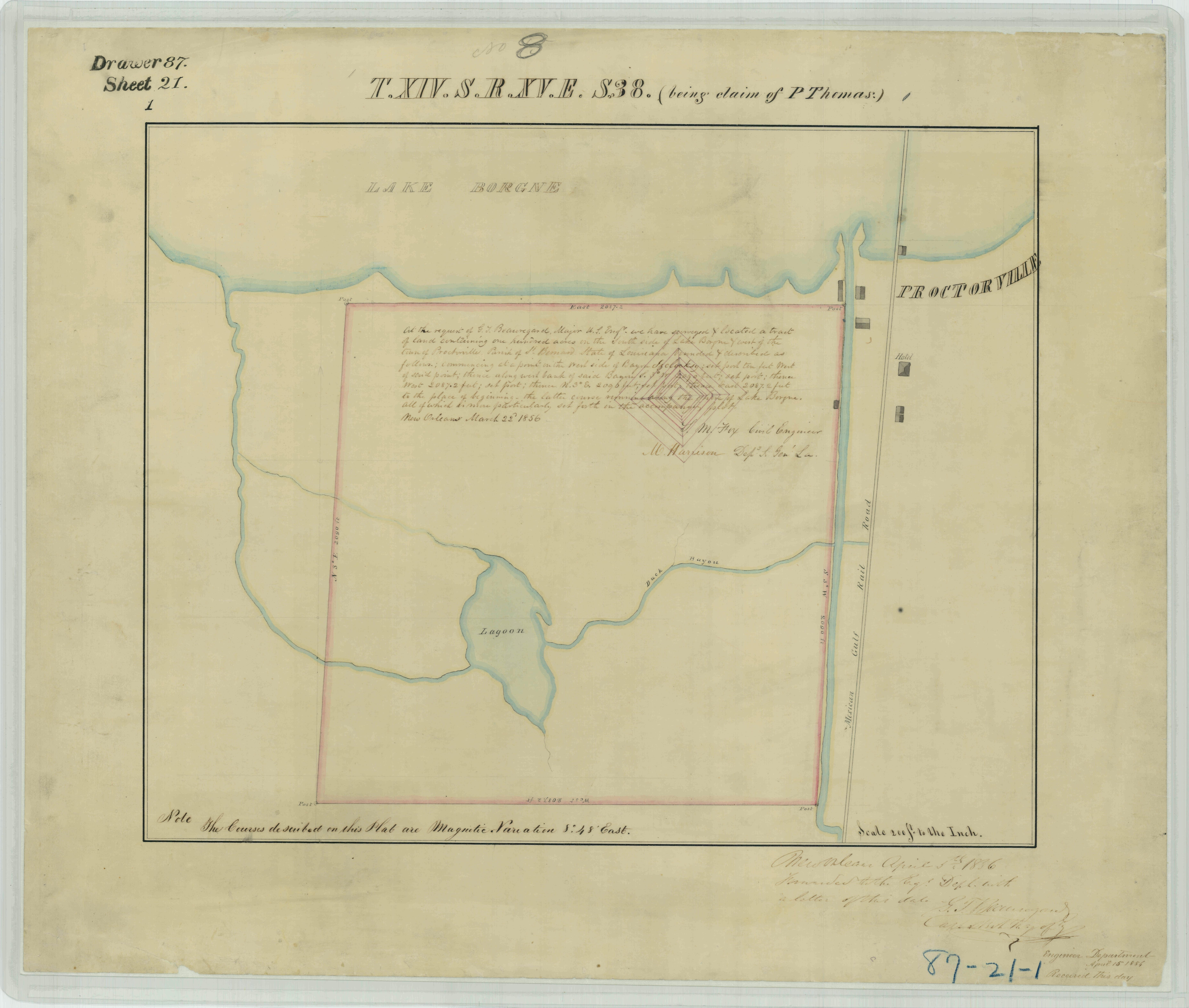
1836 survey map showing Lake Borgne, rail line, and Proctorville

The fort was intended to be part of the fortifications protecting water routes towards New Orleans. In 1814, the British Army had attacked New Orleans after their navy advanced up Lake Borgne and defeated a small flotilla of gunboats belonging to the New Orleans station (US Navy), in the Battle of Lake Borgne.

Due to delays caused by hurricane damage, and then the outbreak of the American Civil War, the fort was never garrisoned. By the end of the Civil War, improvements in artillery had made the design of the fort obsolete.

In the 1940s and 1950s, before it was engulfed by Lake Borgne, the ruins of the fort were a popular gathering place for teenagers seeking a spot where they would not be supervised.

The construction of the Mississippi River-Gulf Outlet Canal in the 1960s cut off all land access to the fort site. It can be seen in the distance from Shell Beach, Louisiana. In 1978, it was listed on the National Register of Historic Places. It is now completely surrounded by water about one foot deep. Before Hurricane Katrina, there remained one small piece of dry land inside of the fort.

The fort was unusual in its design for two innovations: the inclusion of comfortable living quarters including bathrooms, and the extensive use of structural iron in its construction.

Panorama of Fort Proctor
