= Louisiana Highway 39 =

State highway in Louisiana, United States

Louisiana Highway 39

Route information
- Maintained by Louisiana DOTD
- Length: 54.3 mi (87.4 km)
- Existed: 1955 renumbering–present

Major junctions
- South end: Parish Route 15 near Pointe à la Hache
- LA 46 in Poydras; LA 300 in Sebastopol; LA 47 in Chalmette
- North end: I-10 in New Orleans

Location
- Country: United States
- State: Louisiana
- Parishes: Plaquemines, St. Bernard, Orleans

Highway system
- Louisiana State Highway System; Interstate; US; State; Scenic
← LA 38	→ LA 40

Louisiana Highway 39 (LA 39) is a state highway in Louisiana that serves Orleans, St. Bernard, and Plaquemines Parishes. In New Orleans, LA 39 is referred to as North Claiborne Avenue, while in St. Bernard Parish, it is known as Judge Perez Drive. It spans 54.08 miles (87.03 km) and is bannered north/south.

== Route description ==
LA 39 begins at Parish Road 15 outside Bohemia and runs parallel with the Mississippi River and LA 23. It passes through Davant, Phoenix, Carlisle, Wills Point, and Woodlawn along the Mississippi River before intersecting with LA 3137 in Scarsdale. The highway then intersects LA 3137 before passing through Caernarvon. It then merges with LA 46 in Poydras. Both LA 39 and LA 46 turn to the north at the intersection with LA 300 before LA 46 splits from LA 39. The highway then runs to the northwest, running parallel with LA 46 through Meraux before intersecting LA 47 in Chalmette. The highway then enters New Orleans and splits into one-way streets. It then reaches its northern terminus at I-10 at exits 236B and 236C.

== History ==
Early Louisiana maps show that the road continued beyond its current southern terminus to Fort St. Philip, yet it is unsure if this road were built and of what quality. Between Braithewaite and Scarsdale, LA 39 bypassed English Turn, and the original route is now LA 3137. As of 2017, a small portion at the south end is under agreement to be removed from the state highway system and transferred to local control.

== Major intersections ==
Parish	Location	mi	km	Destinations	Notes
Plaquemines	Bohemia	0.0	0.0	Parish Road 15	Southern terminus
Plaquemines	Scarsdale	31.3	50.4	LA 3137 (English Turn Road)	Southern terminus of LA 3137; Unsigned junction
Plaquemines	Braithwaite	34.0	54.7	LA 3137 (English Turn Road)	Northern terminus of LA 3137
St. Bernard	Poydras	41.0	66.0	LA 46 west (East St. Bernard Highway) – Chalmette	South end of LA 46 concurrency
St. Bernard	Sebastopol	38.2	61.5	LA 300 (Bayou Road) – Delacroix	Western terminus of LA 300
St. Bernard		32.2	51.8	LA 46 east – Shell Beach	North end of LA 46 concurrency
St. Bernard	Violet	11.6	18.7	Bridge over Lake Borgne Canal	
St. Bernard	Chalmette	7.5	12.1	Palmisano Boulevard	Northern terminus of former LA 3238; Unsigned junction
St. Bernard	Chalmette	6.7	10.8	LA 47 north (Paris Road)	
Orleans	New Orleans	2.5	4.0	Claiborne Avenue Bridge over Industrial Canal	
Orleans	New Orleans	1.2	1.9	Norfolk Southern Railway overpass	
Orleans	New Orleans	0.5	0.80	LA 46 east / LA 3021 north (Elysian Fields Avenue)	Western terminus of LA 46; Southern terminus of LA 3021
Orleans	New Orleans	0.0	0.0	I-10 – New Orleans, Slidell; St. Bernard Avenue	Northern terminus; Interchange; Exit 236 B-C (I-10); Partially unsigned junction
1.000 mi = 1.609 km; 1.000 km = 0.621 mi: Concurrency terminus
