= List of highways numbered 615 =

The following highways are numbered 615:

== Costa Rica ==
- National Route 615

== United States ==
- SR 615
- MD 615
- NC 615
- SR 615
- PR-615
- SR 615

Preceded by 614	Lists of highways 615	Succeeded by 616
