= Yscloskey, Louisiana =

Yscloskey Habitación (Spanish)
- Unincorporated community
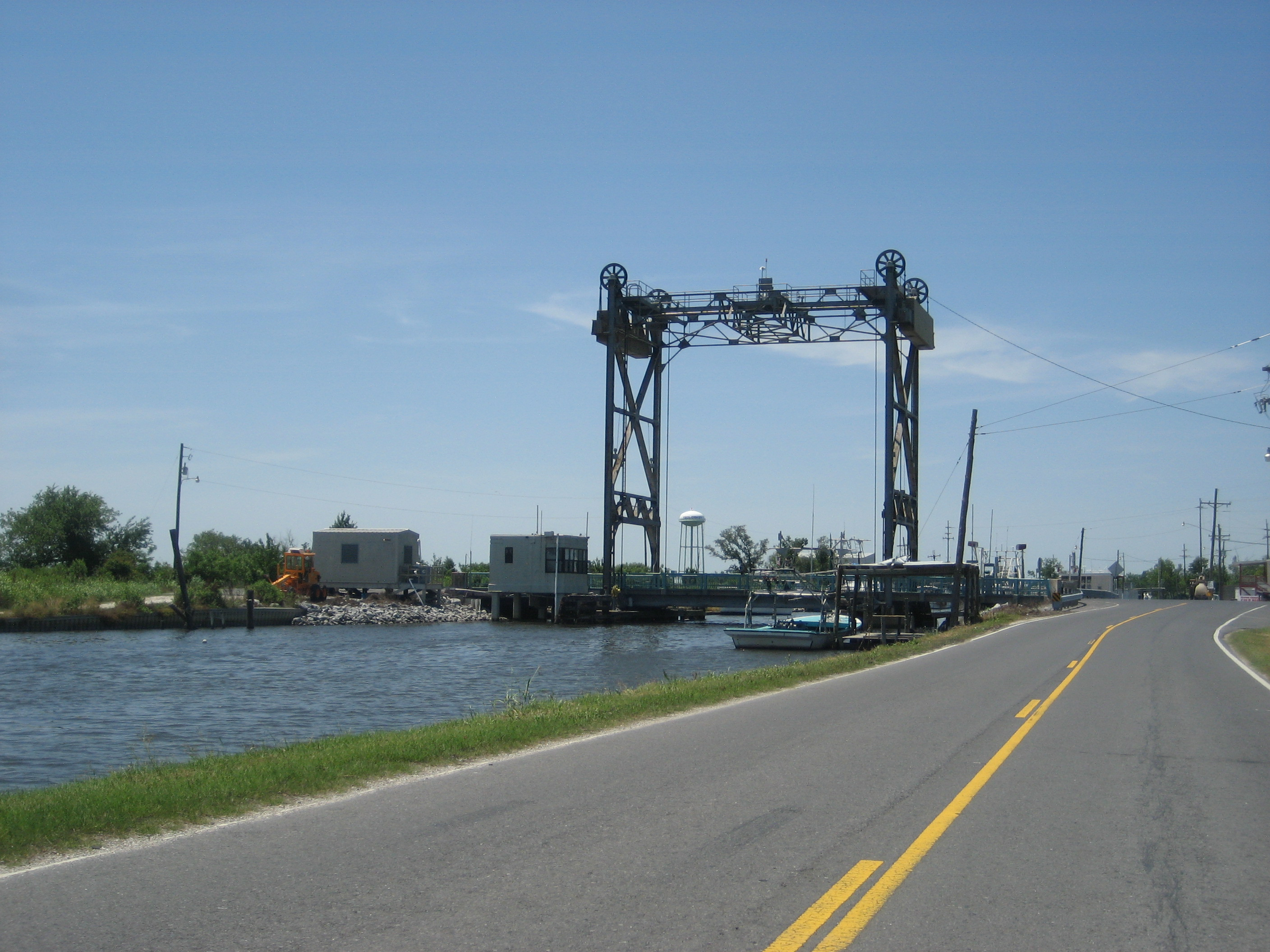
- View of the lift bridge across Bayou la Loutre.

- Location within Louisiana Location within the United States
- Coordinates: 29°50′31″N 89°41′18″W
- Country: United States
- State: Louisiana
- Parish: St. Bernard Parish
- MCD: District E
- Historic colonies: Louisiana (New Spain); Louisiana (New France)
- Established: 1783
- Elevation: 3 ft (0.91 m)
- Demonym(s): waikloskero, -ra; güaiclosquero, -ra
- Time zone: UTC−6 (Central)
  - Summer (DST): UTC−5 (Central)
- ZIP code: 70085
- Area code: 504
- GNIS feature ID: 1628547

Yscloskey (IPA: /waɪˈklɒski/ wy-KLOSK-ee), also commonly known as Habitación (IPA: [aβitaˈsjon]) in Spanish, is an Isleño fishing community in St. Bernard Parish, Louisiana, United States. The community is located near the coast of Lake Borgne on the northeastern bank of Bayou la Loutre and along both sides of Bayou Yscloskey. Following the American Civil War, the community was founded by Isleño hunters, trappers, and fisherman.

Yscloskey is connected to the rest of St. Bernard Parish by the Bayou la Loutre lift bridge, also known as the Yscloskey bridge. The Louisiana Department of Transportation and Development considers the bridge eligible for the National Register of Historic Places. Yscloskey Hwy, a continuation of Louisiana Highway 46, travels through the eastern half of the community as well as Shell Beach.
