= List of highways numbered 617 =

The following highways are numbered 617:

== Canada ==
- Highway 617

== Costa Rica ==
- National Route 617

== United States ==
- MS 617
- SR 617
- PR-617
- SR 617

Preceded by 616	Lists of highways 617	Succeeded by 618
