= Louisiana Highway 52 =

State highway in Louisiana, United States

Louisiana Highway 52
- Paul Maillard Road

Route information
- Maintained by Louisiana DOTD
- Length: 2.74 mi (4.41 km)
- Existed: 1955 renumbering–present

Major junctions
- South end: Future I-49 / US 90 / LA 633 in Boutte
- North end: LA 18 in Luling

Location
- Country: United States
- State: Louisiana
- Parishes: St. Charles

Highway system
- Louisiana State Highway System; Interstate; US; State; Scenic
← US 51	→ LA 53

Louisiana Highway 52 (LA 52) is a state highway located in St. Charles Parish, Louisiana. It runs 2.74 miles (4.41 km) in a north–south direction along Paul Maillard Road from U.S. Highway 90 (US 90) and LA 633 in Boutte to LA 18 in Luling.

The route serves as the main north–south thoroughfare of Luling, located on the west bank of the Mississippi River, and connects it with US 90 at Boutte.

== Route description ==
From the south, LA 52 begins at an intersection with US 90 (the future corridor of I-49) in Boutte. US 90 connects to New Orleans to the east and Houma to the southwest. Directly opposite the intersection is the northern terminus of LA 633 (Magnolia Ridge Road). LA 52 heads north on Paul Maillard Road, immediately intersecting LA 631 (Old Spanish Trail) and crossing the BNSF/Union Pacific Railroad tracks at grade. 0.9 miles (1.4 km) later, LA 52 crosses from Boutte into Luling, passing through a largely residential neighborhood with scattered businesses. After another 1.5 miles (2.4 km), LA 52 has another grade crossing with the Union Pacific Railroad. The highway ends shortly afterward at an intersection with LA 18 (River Road). LA 18 runs along the west bank levee of the Mississippi River and connects to the Hale Boggs Memorial Bridge on I-310, a distance of 0.8 miles (1.3 km) upriver.

LA 52 is an undivided, two-lane highway for its entire length. The route is classified as an urban collector by the Louisiana Department of Transportation and Development (La DOTD) with an average daily traffic volume of 8,500 in 2013. It has a posted speed limit of 35 mph (55 km/h), reduced to 25 mph (40 km/h) between the northern railroad crossing and LA 18.

== History ==
In the original Louisiana Highway system in use between 1921 and 1955, the modern LA 52 was originally designated as part of State Route 2, which followed the Old Spanish Trail auto trail throughout the state of Louisiana. In 1926, it became part of the original route of US 90, which duplicated Route 2 throughout the state. In April 1941, US 90 was moved onto its current alignment between Boutte and the Huey P. Long Bridge, bypassing the winding River Road. Route 2 was moved along with it, and the former alignment through Luling carried the designation of Route 1092 until the 1955 Louisiana Highway renumbering.

La 52—From a junction with La-US 90 at or near Boutte to a junction with La 18 at or near Luling.

— 1955 legislative route description

LA 52 was created with the 1955 renumbering, and its route has remained the same to the present day.

== Future ==
La DOTD is currently engaged in a program that aims to transfer about 5,000 miles (8,000 km) of state-owned roadways to local governments over the next several years. Under this plan of "right-sizing" the state highway system, the entire route of LA 52 is proposed for deletion as it does not meet a significant interurban travel function.

== Major intersections ==
The entire highway is in St. Charles Parish.

Location	mi	km	Destinations	Notes
Boutte	0.0	0.0	US 90 – New Orleans, Houma; LA 633 (Magnolia Ridge Road)	Southern terminus of LA 52; northern terminus of LA 633
Boutte	0.07	0.11	LA 631 (Old Spanish Trail)	Eastern terminus of LA 631
Luling	2.7	4.3	LA 18 (River Road) – Mississippi River Bridge, Ama	Northern terminus
1.000 mi = 1.609 km; 1.000 km = 0.621 mi
