= List of highways numbered 614 =

The following highways are numbered 614:

== Canada ==
- Ontario Highway 614
- Saskatchewan Highway 614

== Costa Rica ==
- National Route 614

== United States ==
- SR 614
- MD 614
- MS 614
- SR 614

Preceded by 613	Lists of highways 614	Succeeded by 615
