= List of highways numbered 618 =

The following highways are numbered 618:

== Costa Rica ==
- National Route 618

== United States ==
- SR 618
- PA 618
- PR-618
- SR 618
- WV 618

== Canada ==
- Highway 618

Preceded by 617	Lists of highways 618	Succeeded by 619
