= Carlisle, Louisiana =

- Unincorporated community
- Location within Louisiana Location within the United States
- Coordinates: 29°41′13″N 89°57′44″W
- Country: United States
- State: Louisiana
- Parish: Plaquemines
- Elevation: 7 ft (2.1 m)
- Time zone: UTC-6 (Central (CST))
  - Summer (DST): UTC-5 (CDT)
- ZIP code: 70040
- Area code: 504
- GNIS feature ID: 541063

Carlisle is an unincorporated community in Plaquemines Parish, Louisiana, United States. Carlisle is located on the east bank of the Mississippi River and Louisiana Highway 39, 19.3 miles (31.1 km) south-southeast of New Orleans.
