= List of highways numbered 616 =

The following highways are numbered 616:

== Canada ==
- Alberta Highway 616
- New Brunswick Route 616
- Saskatchewan Highway 616

== Costa Rica ==
- National Route 616

== United States ==
- SR 616
- SR 616
- PA 616
- PR-616
- SR 616

Preceded by 615	Lists of highways 616	Succeeded by 617
