= Louisiana Highway 47 =

Highway in Louisiana

Louisiana Highway 47

- Route of LA 47 highlighted in red

Route information
- Maintained by Louisiana DOTD
- Length: 15.911 mi (25.606 km)
- Existed: 1955 renumbering–present

Major junctions
- South end: Mississippi River levee in Chalmette
- LA 46 in Chalmette; LA 39 in Chalmette; I-510 in New Orleans; US 90 in New Orleans; I-10 / I-510 in New Orleans
- North end: Hayne Boulevard / Downman Road in New Orleans

Location
- Country: United States
- State: Louisiana
- Parishes: St. Bernard, Orleans

Highway system
- Louisiana State Highway System; Interstate; US; State; Scenic
← LA 46	→ LA 48
← SR 60	SR 61	→ SR 62

Louisiana Highway 47 (LA 47) is a state highway located in southeastern Louisiana. It runs 15.91 miles (25.60 km) in a general southeast to northwest direction from the Mississippi River levee in Chalmette to the intersection of Hayne Boulevard and Downman Road in New Orleans.

LA 47 makes the shape of the number "7" and begins as a north–south route that travels along Paris Road through Chalmette, an unincorporated suburb of New Orleans and the seat of neighboring St. Bernard Parish. North of Chalmette, LA 47 crosses a high-level bridge over the Gulf Intracoastal Waterway and transitions to a controlled-access freeway that doubles as Interstate 510 (I-510). This stretch contains interchanges with both I-10 and U.S. Highway 90 (US 90), two major routes heading east out of New Orleans. The above segments of LA 47 serve not only as the primary north–south thoroughfare through Chalmette but also provide a vital hurricane evacuation route for residents of St. Bernard Parish and the east bank portion of Plaquemines Parish.

LA 47 was designated in the 1955 Louisiana Highway renumbering, replacing former State Route 61. North of I-10, the route turns west along the shore of Lake Pontchartrain and follows Hayne Boulevard from Little Woods to a point near the New Orleans Lakefront Airport. This portion of the route is an unsigned extension that came under state maintenance during the late 1970s.

== Route description ==
=== St. Bernard Parish ===
From the south, LA 47 begins atop the Mississippi River levee in Chalmette, the seat of St. Bernard Parish. It continues the route of a local road that travels 0.2 miles (0.32 km) northward from the Chalmette–Lower Algiers Ferry landing. LA 47 heads north on Paris Road as an undivided two-lane highway and passes through an area dominated by petrochemical refineries. After passing the parish jail, LA 47 intersects LA 46 (St. Bernard Highway), connecting with New Orleans to the west and Poydras to the southeast. Just over one mile (1.6 km) to the west on LA 46 is the historic Chalmette Battlefield and National Cemetery.

Proceeding north from LA 46, Paris Road widens to four lanes with a center turning lane as the surroundings become largely residential. After eight blocks, LA 47 intersects LA 39 (Judge Perez Drive), a divided highway that parallels LA 46 through St. Bernard Parish. Heading toward the back of town, LA 47 passes the Park Plaza Shopping Center (the location of the local post office) as well as Nunez Community College. Upon exiting Chalmette, the center lane gives way to a median, and the highway continues into the marshland atop a narrow strip of dry land lined with small marine-related industries.

=== New Orleans East ===
About two miles (3.2 km) later, LA 47 crosses a level bridge over Bayou Bienvenue into Orleans Parish and the city of New Orleans, which are co-extensive. The highway then crosses a high-level bridge over the much wider Gulf Intracoastal Waterway, an industrial shipping channel. Returning to grade, LA 47 becomes a controlled-access highway that also serves as the entire route of I-510. This concurrency lasts for 3.5 miles (5.6 km) and contains four closely spaced interchanges. The first is exit 2C, a stingray-shaped diamond interchange that connects with Old Gentilly Road via Almonaster Boulevard and serves the nearby NASA Michoud Assembly Facility. This is followed by exit 2A–B to US 90 (Chef Menteur Highway), a major route through New Orleans East. Continuing north, a more traditional diamond interchange at exit 1B serves Lake Forest Boulevard, and soon afterward, the abandoned Six Flags New Orleans theme park appears on the east side of the highway.

The fourth and final interchange is exit 1A, a partial cloverleaf with flyover ramps that connects to I-10. New Orleans' major east–west route, I-10 connects with the Central Business District to the southwest and the city of Slidell to the northeast. Having intersected its parent route, I-510 ends, and LA 47 continues ahead as a divided four-lane highway without control of access. The highway reaches the south shore of Lake Pontchartrain in an area known as Little Woods, located at the easternmost extent of urban development along the lake shore. Here, LA 47 turns southwest onto Hayne Boulevard, an undivided four-lane thoroughfare. For the next 4.5 miles (7.2 km), LA 47 travels through residential New Orleans East while closely following the lake levee, which is topped by a concrete floodwall. Several divided neighborhood thoroughfares, such as Bullard Avenue, Read Boulevard, and Crowder Boulevard, lead back to interchanges with I-10. Just west of Crowder Boulevard, a ramp provides access to the New Orleans Lakefront Airport and the Senator Ted Hickey Bridge across the Industrial Canal. LA 47 continues along Hayne Boulevard for another 1.3 miles (2.1 km) to an intersection with Downman Road, which parallels the industrial corridor located along the east side of the canal.

=== Route classification and data ===
LA 47 is classified by the Louisiana Department of Transportation and Development (La DOTD) as an urban principal arterial south of I-510 and an urban interstate over the I-510 concurrency. The remainder of the route is generally classified as an urban minor arterial. Daily traffic volume in 2013 peaked at 28,500 vehicles between Chalmette and the I-510 concurrency. North of I-10, figures dropped off sharply to a low of 5,600 along much of the Hayne Boulevard segment. The posted speed limit is generally 40 mph (65 km/h) in developed areas, increased to 55 mph (90 km/h) in rural areas and 60 mph (95 km/h) over the freeway portion of the route.

== History ==
=== Pre-1955 route numbering ===
State Route 61
- Location: Chalmette–Eastern New Orleans
- Length: 6.4 mi (10.3 km)
- Existed: 1921–1955

In the original Louisiana Highway system in use between 1921 and 1955, the majority of LA 47 was designated as State Route 61. It was created in 1921 by an act of the state legislature as one of the original 98 state highway routes.

Route No. 61. Beginning on Route No. 1 at Versailles, through Bayou Bienvenue to Route No. 2 at the Gentilly Road.

— 1921 legislative route description

The southernmost portion of the route followed the existing Paris Road, originally platted in the early 19th Century as the main street of Versailles, an ambitious town plan that evolved into the present community of Chalmette. North of town, Route 61 was projected to traverse the swamps until reaching the natural ridge along Bayou Sauvage that supported the roadbed of the Old Spanish Trail, designated as Route 2. Now known as Old Gentilly Road, this highway became the original alignment of US 90 upon its designation in 1926.

Route 61 was constructed through the swamps north of Chalmette around the end of the 1920s. The route originally contained a swing bridge across Bayou Bienvenue on the St. Bernard–Orleans parish line, the remains of which can still be seen immediately to the west of the present fixed span. In 1936, the entire length of Route 61 was improved from a gravel road to a paved road. Shortly afterward, a gravel extension was completed north to Hayne Boulevard, giving St. Bernard Parish residents direct access to Little Woods, an area on Lake Pontchartrain lined with recreational camps built over the water. This road did not become part of the state highway system at this time. However, in 1942, the Route 61 designation was extended slightly to connect with the newly constructed relocation of US 90 known as Chef Menteur Highway. Around the middle of the decade, the Gulf Intracoastal Waterway was dug through the area, necessitating a second bridge crossing on Route 61.

=== Post-1955 route history ===
LA 47 was created in 1955 as a direct renumbering of former Route 61.

Class "B": La 47—From a junction with La 39 at or near Chalmette to a junction with La-US 90 near Micheaud[sic].
Class "C": La 47—From the Mississippi River Levee at Chalmette to a junction with La 39.

— 1955 legislative route description

With the 1955 renumbering, the state highway department initially categorized all routes into three classes: "A" (primary), "B" (secondary), and "C" (farm-to-market). This system has since been updated and replaced by a more specific functional classification system.

Since the renumbering, LA 47 has been extensively improved and reconstructed. Construction began in the early 1960s on I-10 running parallel to US 90 through New Orleans East. LA 47 was again extended north along Paris Road about 2.5 miles (4.0 km) to a planned connection with the future interstate highway. The resulting interchange was partially opened in April 1967 when I-10 was completed eastward from Paris Road to the Twin Span Bridge across Lake Pontchartrain. That same year, a new high-level fixed span bridge on LA 47 across the Gulf Intracoastal Waterway was opened to traffic. Designed by the Army Corps of Engineers, the cantilever truss bridge with tied arch-suspended span contained four vehicular lanes and allowed all marine traffic to pass underneath unimpeded. Officially called the Paris Road Bridge, its original green painted surface led to its being called the "Green Bridge" by St. Bernard Parish residents. The I-10/LA 47 interchange was fully opened to traffic in October 1972 when the interstate was completed westward to Morrison Road near the Industrial Canal bridge.

==== Interstate 510 ====
By the early 1970s, a project was underway to reconstruct LA 47 as a modern four-lane highway connecting Chalmette with the new Gulf Intracoastal Waterway bridge. This involved the construction of a new roadway embankment through the swamp running parallel to the existing two-lane highway as well as a new fixed span bridge across Bayou Bienvenue. The entire corridor was intended to become part of I-410, a planned southern loop around New Orleans designated in 1969 that would connect with I-10 on either side of the city. Construction was not completed until around 1980, three years after the I-410 loop was cancelled. However, the portion north of the Gulf Intracoastal Waterway bridge was retained as I-510, a short spur of I-10. Around this same time, the Louisiana Department of Transportation and Development took over the northern portion of Paris Road and the entirety of Hayne Boulevard west to Morrison Road into the state highway system as an extension of LA 47.

The portion of LA 47 designated as I-510 was improved as an interstate-grade freeway beginning in 1985. While it required only 2.7 miles (4.3 km) of construction, the project was many years behind schedule mainly due to environmental-related concerns. A four-lane detour was paved on the west side of the right-of-way to serve through traffic during construction and is still in use today as a frontage road. The completed interstate spur was officially dedicated and opened to traffic by Louisiana Governor Edwin Edwards on November 13, 1992 after seven years of construction and an expenditure of $82 million. It included new interchanges at Almonaster Boulevard (connecting to Old Gentilly Road), US 90 (Chef Menteur Highway), and Lake Forest Boulevard. Additionally, the US 90 interchange served as a grade separation for the parallel Canadian National Railway (CN) line. The reconstructed route facilitated the movement of traffic between Chalmette and New Orleans East and provided a vastly improved outlet for St. Bernard and Plaquemines Parish residents during hurricane evacuations.

== Future ==
La DOTD is currently engaged in a program that aims to transfer about 5,000 miles (8,000 km) of state-owned roadways to local governments over the next several years. Under this plan of "right-sizing" the state highway system, the entire portion of LA 47 from I-10 to the intersection of Hayne Boulevard and Downman Road is to be transferred back to the city of New Orleans as it does not meet a significant interurban travel function.

== Major intersections ==
Parish	Location	mi	km	Exit	Destinations	Notes
St. Bernard	Chalmette	0.000	0.000		Begin state maintenance on Ferry Landing Road at Mississippi River levee	Southern terminus; to Chalmette–Lower Algiers Ferry
St. Bernard	Chalmette	0.495	0.797		LA 46 (St. Bernard Highway) – New Orleans, Poydras	
St. Bernard	Chalmette	0.918– 0.933	1.477– 1.502		LA 39 (Judge Perez Drive)	
St. Bernard–Orleans parish line	New Orleans	3.832– 3.890	6.167– 6.260	Bridge over Bayou Bienvenue		
Orleans	New Orleans	4.896– 6.150	7.879– 9.897	Paris Road Bridge over Gulf Intracoastal Waterway		
Orleans	New Orleans	6.173– 6.619	9.934– 10.652	2C	I-510 begins Almonaster Boulevard to Old Gentilly Road	Southern terminus of I-510; south end of I-510 concurrency
Orleans	New Orleans	6.767– 7.447	10.890– 11.985	2A	US 90 (Chef Menteur Highway)	Signed northbound as exits 2A (west) and 2B (east)
Orleans	New Orleans	7.767– 8.510	12.500– 13.696	1B	Lake Forest Boulevard	
Orleans	New Orleans	8.900– 9.569	14.323– 15.400	1A	I-10 – New Orleans, Slidell	Exit 246 on I-10
Orleans	New Orleans	9.608	15.463		I-510 ends	Northern terminus of I-510; north end of I-510 concurrency
Orleans	New Orleans	15.911	25.606		End state maintenance at junction of Hayne Boulevard and Downman Road	Northern terminus
1.000 mi = 1.609 km; 1.000 km = 0.621 mi: Concurrency terminus

== See also ==
- Interstate 510
