= Alluvial City, Louisiana =

Alluvial City
- Unincorporated community
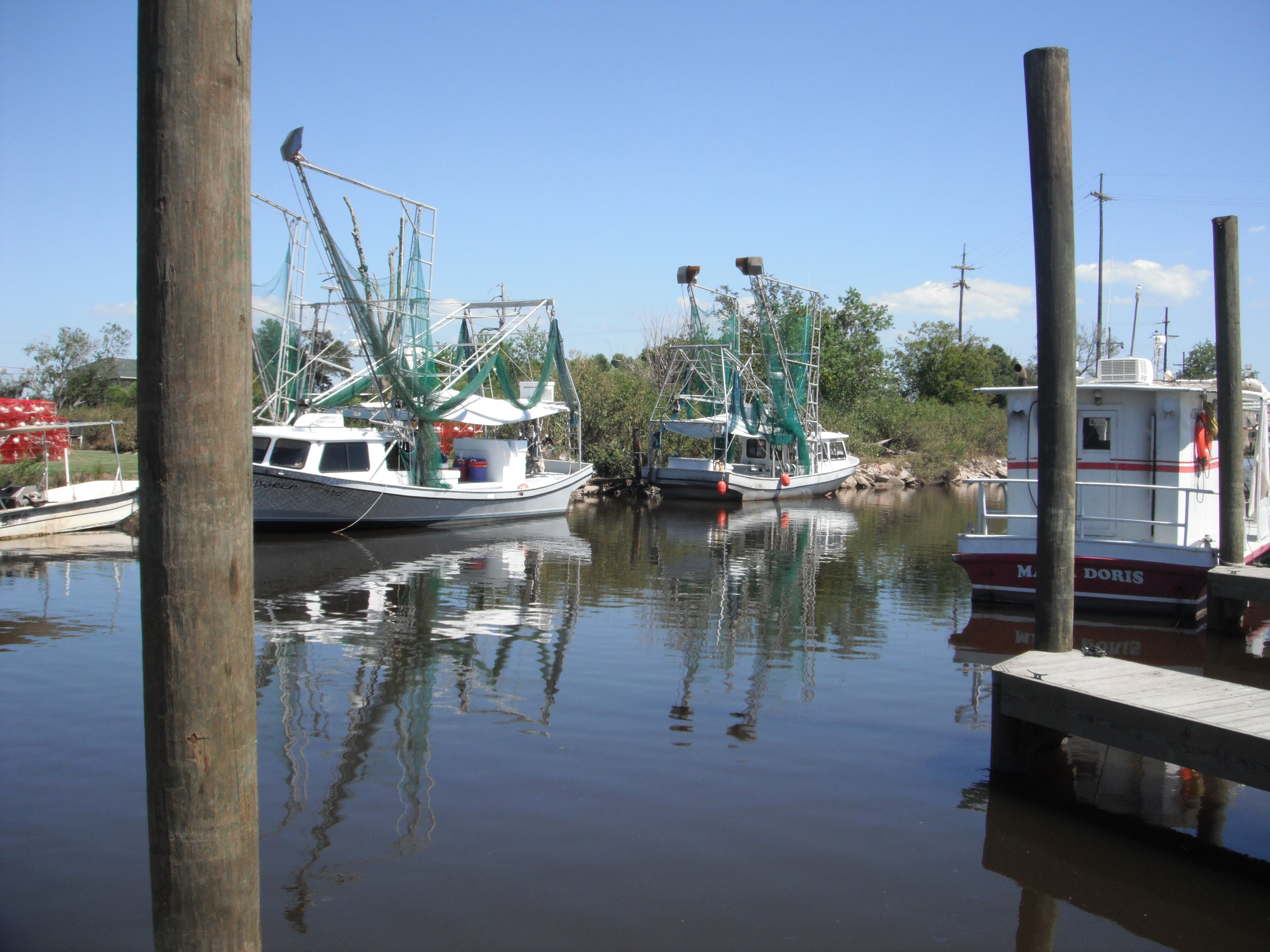
- Boats in Alluvial City, September 2011

- Location within Louisiana Location within the United States
- Coordinates: 29°50′29″N 89°41′29″W
- Country: United States
- State: Louisiana
- Parish: St. Bernard Parish
- MCD: District E
- Established: 19th century
- Elevation: 3 ft (0.91 m)
- Time zone: UTC−6 (Central)
  - Summer (DST): UTC−5 (Central)
- ZIP code: 70085
- Area code: 504
- GNIS feature ID: 559767

Alluvial City is an Isleño fishing community in St. Bernard Parish, Louisiana, United States. The community is located on the western bank of Bayou la Loutre. Alluvial City is connected to the neighboring community of Yscloskey by the Bayou la Loutre lift bridge, also known as the Yscloskey bridge.

== In popular culture ==
The community was the inspiration for the literary work Alluvial Cities: Poems.
