= Balmoral, Louisiana =

- Unincorporated community
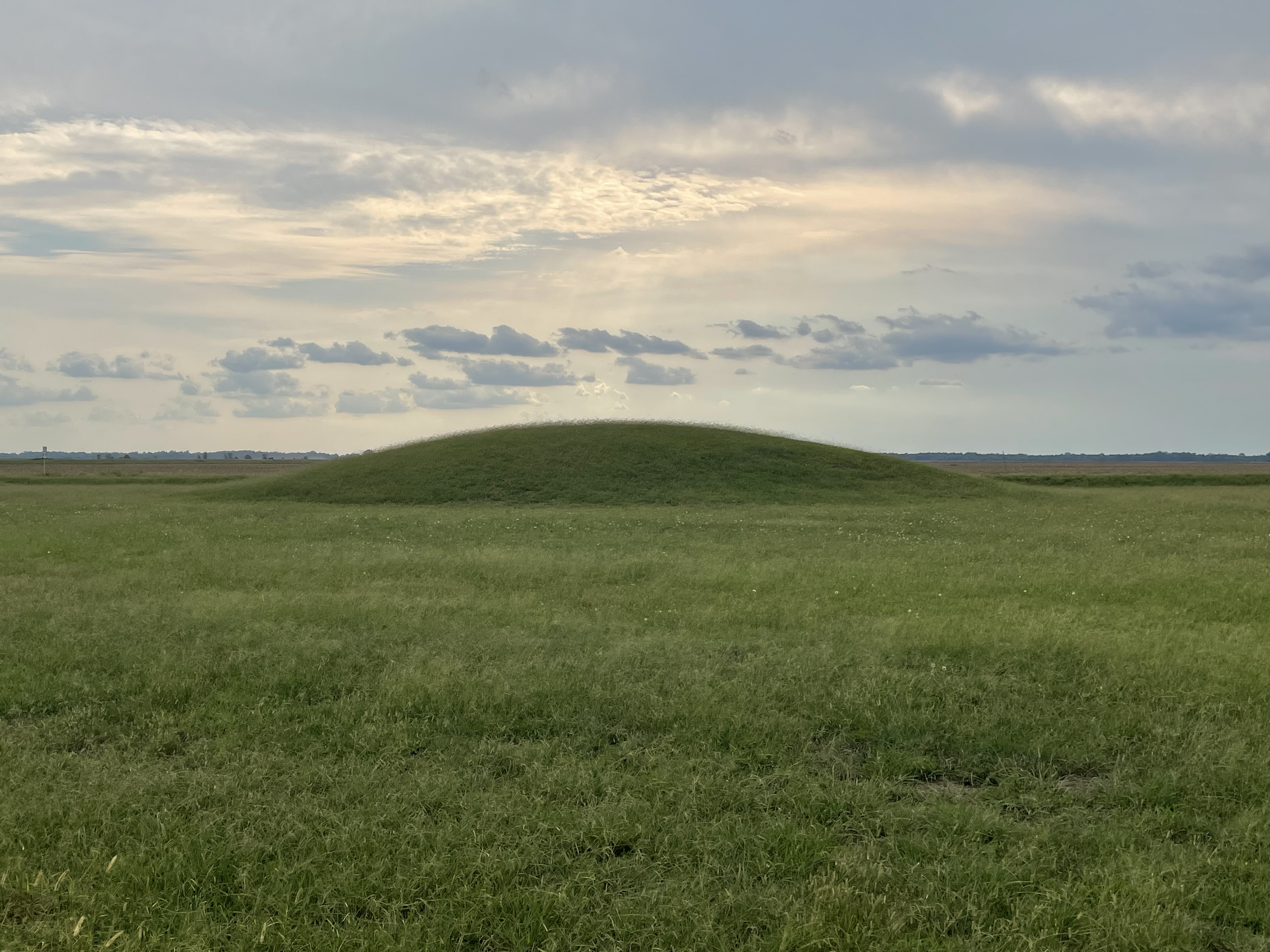

- Location within Louisiana Location within the United States
- Coordinates: 32°06′54″N 91°13′26″W
- Country: United States
- State: Louisiana
- Parish: Tensas
- Elevation: 82 ft (25 m)
- Time zone: UTC-6 (Central (CST))
  - Summer (DST): UTC-5 (CDT)
- Area code: 318
- GNIS feature ID: 542947

Balmoral is an unincorporated community in Tensas Parish, Louisiana, United States.

== See also ==
- Balmoral Mounds
