= Swampers, Louisiana =

Unincorporated community in Louisiana, U.S.

Coordinates: 32°11′28″N 091°34′15″W

Swampers (or Killians Ferry) is an unincorporated community in Franklin Parish, Louisiana.

Harris Cemetery is located in Swampers. Interred there is Regnal Wallace, the former Louisiana farm broadcaster of radio and television.
