= Grand Bayou, Plaquemines Parish, Louisiana =

Grand Bayou, Louisiana
- Unincorporated community
- Location within the state of Louisiana Grand Bayou, Louisiana (the United States)
- Coordinates: 29°30′41″N 89°45′55″W
- Country: United States
- State: Louisiana
- Parish: Plaquemines
- Elevation: 0 ft (0 m)

Population
  - Total: 40
- Time zone: UTC-6 (CST)
  - Summer (DST): UTC-5 (CDT)
- GNIS feature ID: 535309

Grand Bayou is an unincorporated Native American community in Plaquemines Parish, Louisiana. The coastal village is home to the Atakapa Ishak Chawasha tribe and is only accessible by water. It has historically been self-sustaining and relies heavily on fishing.

The tribe settled in the area in the 1830s after the passage of the Indian Removal Act, and the village's population was around 1,000 in the 1940s. Since then, coastal erosion and disasters such as Hurricane Katrina have drastically impacted the settlement. The village now consists of 14 houses and a nondenominational church. Most of the buildings are supported by stilts. Grand Bayou received increased attention after the Louisiana Coastal Protection and Restoration Authority's 2017 master plan for coastal restoration included neither aid nor a resettlement plan for the village. This has been partially attributed to the tribal community's lack of federal recognition.

In 2024, a 600-acre parcel (240 ha) that includes a sacred mound was given back to the tribe by St. Paul's Episcopal Church of New Orleans. The church's ownership was discovered when the tribe was working with the Coalition To Restore Coastal Louisiana on shoreline protection. The land had been willed to the church in the 1980s.
