= Hopedale, Louisiana =

Hopedale La Chinche
- Unincorporated community
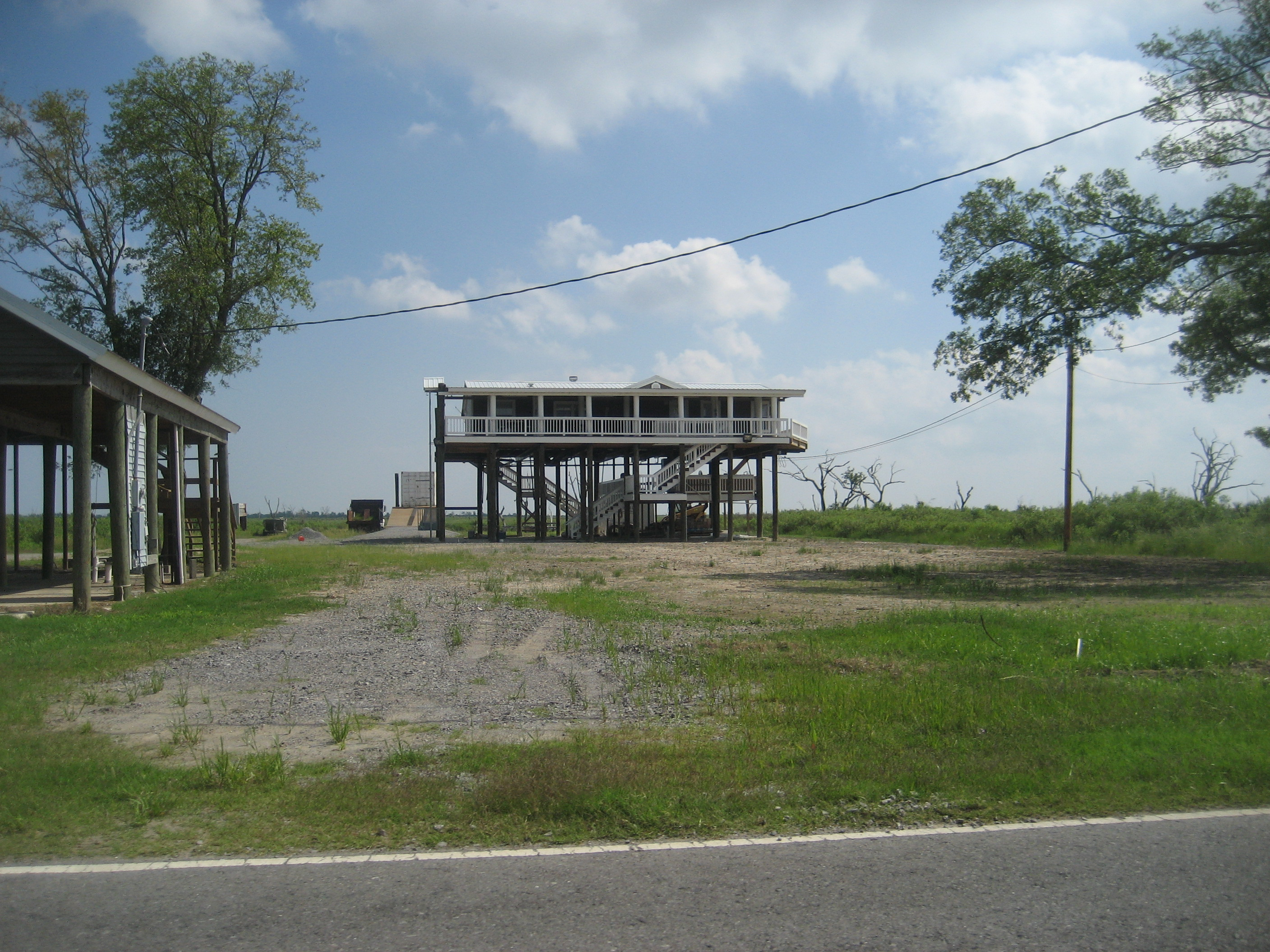
- Raised structure in Hopedale in 2010

- Location within Louisiana Location within the United States
- Coordinates: 29°49′14″N 89°39′24″W
- Country: United States
- State: Louisiana
- Parish: St. Bernard Parish
- MCD: Parish Governing Authority District E
- Historic colonies: Louisiana (New Spain); Louisiana (New France)
- Established: 19th century
- Elevation: 3 ft (0.91 m)
- Demonym(s): chinchero, -ra
- Time zone: UTC−6 (Central)
  - Summer (DST): UTC−5 (Central)
- ZIP code: 70085
- Area code: 504
- GNIS feature ID: 560997

Hopedale (/ˈhoʊpdeɪl/), also known as La Chinche (/lɑː ˈtʃiːntʃeɪ/, Spanish: [la ˈtʃintʃe]), is a fishing community located along Bayou La Loutre in St. Bernard Parish, Louisiana. The community was established by Isleño fisherman and trappers following the American Civil War. The community was devastated in Hurricane Katrina in 2005.
