= St. Bernard Parish, Louisiana =

Parish in Louisiana, United States

St. Bernard Parish
- Parish
- Parish of St. Bernard; Paroisse de Saint-Bernard (French); Parroquia de San Bernardo (Spanish); San Bèrnè Pari (Louisiana Creole)
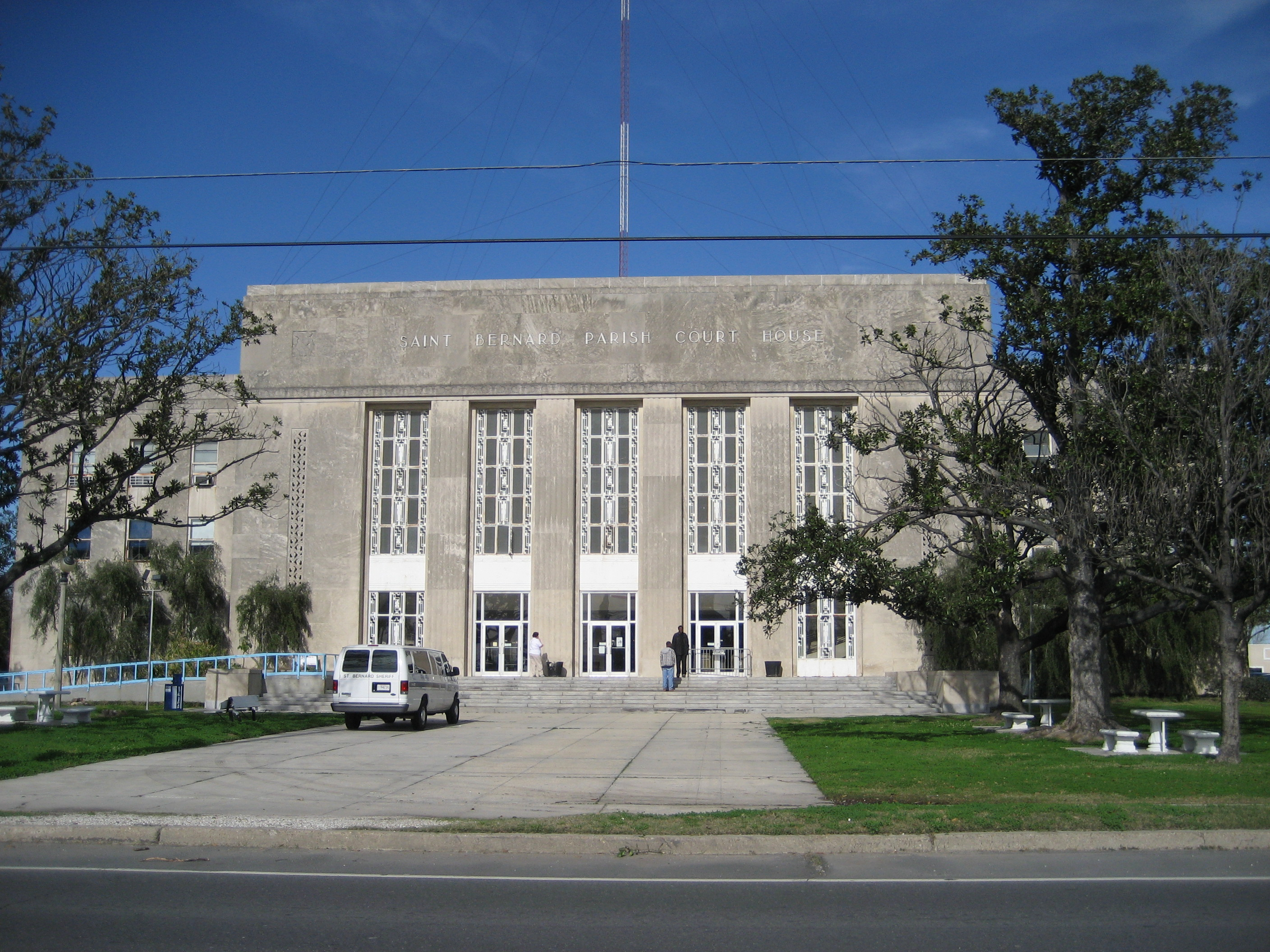
- St. Bernard Parish Courthouse

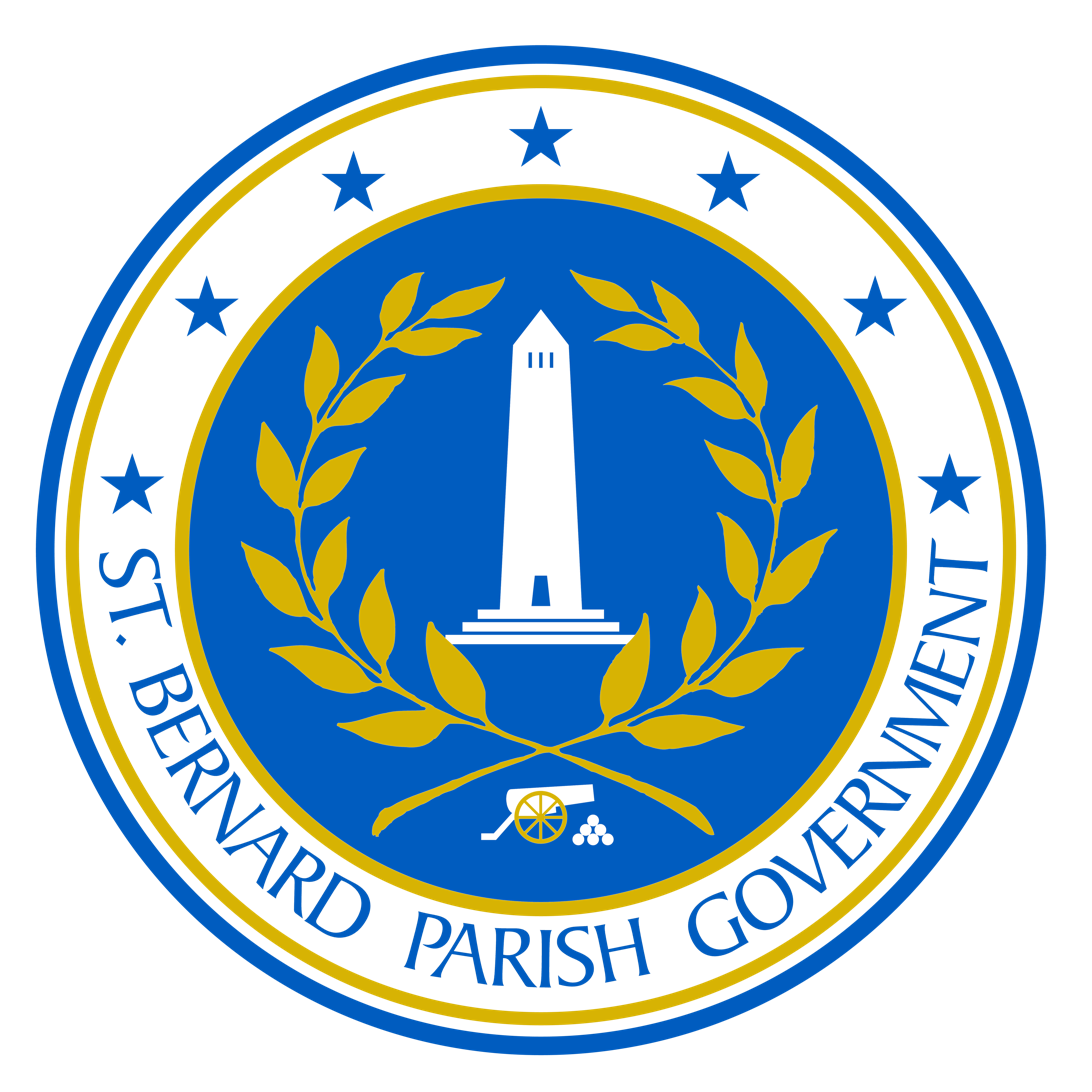
- Flag Seal Logo

- Location within the U.S. state of Louisiana
- Coordinates: 29°53′N 89°21′W
- Country: United States
- State: Louisiana
- Founded: March 31, 1807
- Named for: Bernardo de Galvez
- Seat: Chalmette
- Largest community: Chalmette

Area
  - Total: 2,158 sq mi (5,590 km^{2})
  - Land: 378 sq mi (980 km^{2})
  - Water: 1,781 sq mi (4,610 km^{2}) 83%

Population (2020)
  - Total: 43,764
  - Estimate (2025): 45,642 ▲
  - Density: 115.78/sq mi (44.70/km^{2})
- Time zone: UTC−6 (Central)
  - Summer (DST): UTC−5 (CDT)
- Congressional districts: 1st, 2nd
- Website: sbpg.net

St. Bernard Parish (French: Paroisse de Saint-Bernard; Spanish: Parroquia de San Bernardo; Louisiana Creole: San Bèrnè Pari) is a parish in the U.S. state of Louisiana. The parish seat and largest community is Chalmette. The parish was formed in 1807. St. Bernard Parish is part of the New Orleans–Metairie metropolitan statistical area; the parish is located southeast of the city of New Orleans and comprises the Chandeleur Islands and Chandeleur Sound in the east.

St. Bernard was the fastest growing parish in Louisiana from 2010 to 2020, increasing from a population of 35,897 in the 2010 census to 43,764 in 2020. It remains at less than two-thirds of its 2000 population of 67,229, prior to Hurricane Katrina.

== History ==
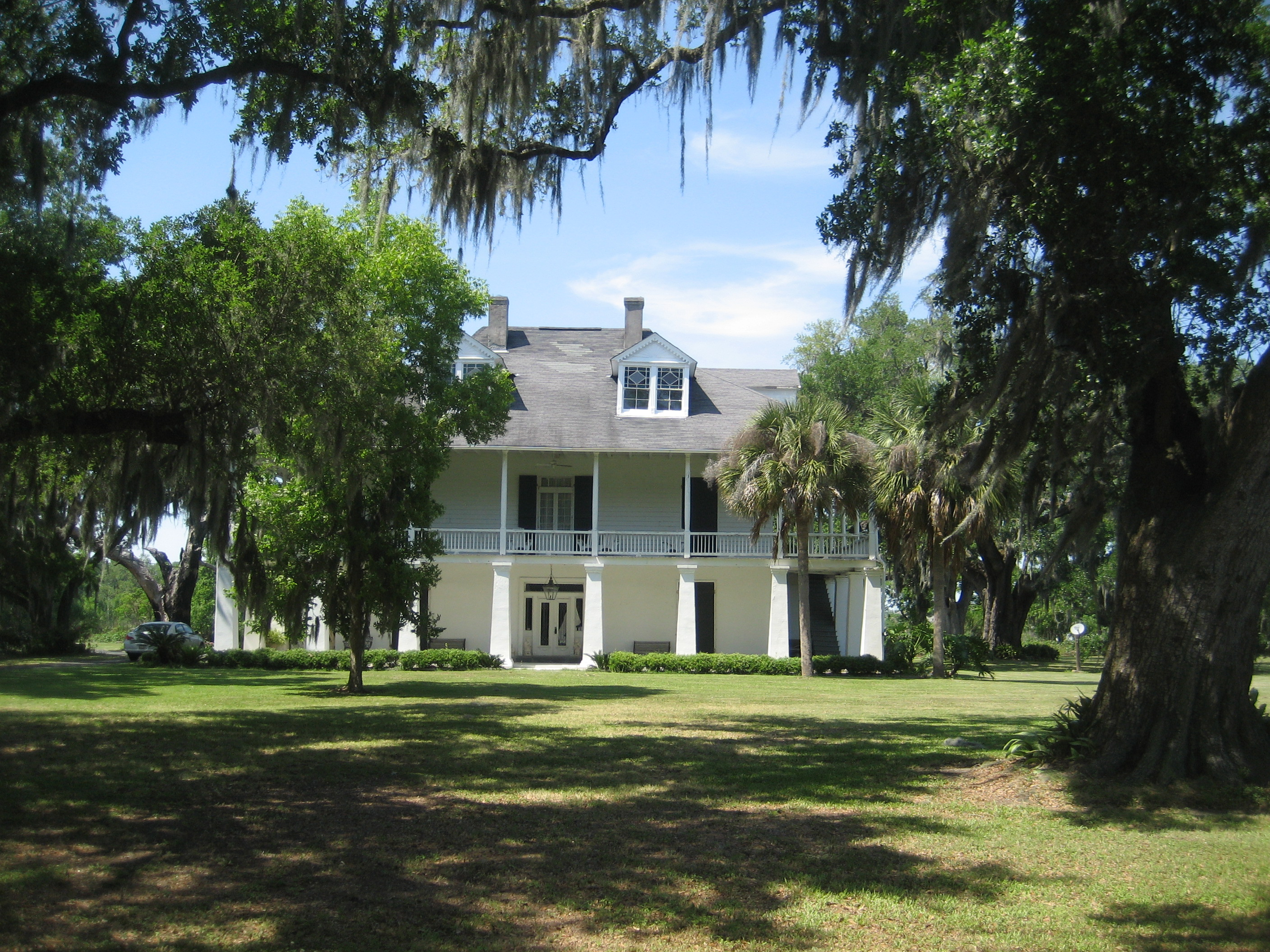
Kenilworth Plantation House (originally Bienvenu) in St. Bernard's Terre aux Boeufs dates back to the 1750s.

St. Bernard Parish contains a large community of Spanish descent. Sometimes referred to informally as "Spanish Cajuns", the Isleños are descended from Canary Islanders. This linguistically isolated group eventually developed its own dialect. The Isleños settled along Bayou Terre aux Boeufs, a relict distributary bayou of the Mississippi River. According to Dumont de Montigny, who was in Louisiana from 1719 to 1738, Terre aux Bœufs (bœuf is 'steer' or 'ox' in French, thus Terre aux Bœufs means 'land of oxen') was named in that period, presumably due to the presence of domestic or feral cattle there, and not because of bison (bison in French). This settlement was called La Concepción and Nueva Gálvez by Spanish officials, but was also called Tierra de Bueyes (Spanish for 'land of oxen'). Saint Bernard, the patron saint of colonial governor Bernardo de Gálvez, was used in documents to identify the area.

St. Bernard Parish is also home to the earliest Filipino community in the United States, Saint Malo, Louisiana.

The chief historical attraction in St. Bernard Parish is the Chalmette Battlefield (part of Jean Lafitte National Historical Park and Preserve), at which the Battle of New Orleans took place on January 8, 1815, during the War of 1812. Many street names near the battlefield bear the names of the chief participants, or take a pirate theme, since the pirate Jean Lafitte was considered to be a hero in the battle. A high school, later elementary and now a middle school, was named in honor of Andrew Jackson, who was the commanding officer in charge of defending New Orleans against the British invasion.

In 1863, Abraham Lincoln mentioned St. Bernard Parish in the Emancipation Proclamation as an area not in rebellion against the Union during the Civil War.

From 1919 to 1969, the parish was effectively ruled as part of the fiefdom of Leander Perez, a local Democratic official in neighboring Plaquemines Parish.

=== 1868 St. Bernard Parish Massacre ===
In 1868, St. Bernard Parish was home to one of the deadliest massacres in Louisiana history. The St. Bernard Parish massacre occurred during the Reconstruction era, days before the Presidential election of 1868. As Black men gained the right to vote, white Democrats of the parish feared losing their majority. Armed groups mobilized to violently silence these recently emancipated voters to win the election in favor of Democrat Horatio Seymour over Republican Ulysses S. Grant. A Seymour victory meant the end of Reconstruction over the South and the return of Louisiana to home rule. Many freedpeople were dragged from their homes and murdered. Others fled to the cane fields to hide from the perpetrators.

The use of violence to suppress Republican votes was successful. Grant only received one vote from St. Bernard Parish, despite having a Republican majority. The reported number of freedpeople killed varies from 35 to 135; the confirmed number of whites killed was at least two (one was killed in an attempt to help the victims).

=== Great Mississippi River Flood of 1927 ===
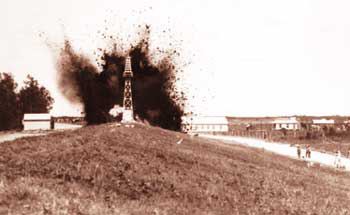
An Army Corps Photo of the levee at Caernarvon being dynamited during the floods of 1927.

During the Great Mississippi Flood of 1927, New Orleans city and state leaders used dynamite to breach a levee at Caernarvon, 13 miles (21 km) below Canal Street, to save the city of New Orleans from flooding. At the time, it was thought by New Orleans residents that the dynamiting saved the city, but historians now believe that the dynamiting was unnecessary due to major upstream levee breaks that relieved pressure on the New Orleans levees. The levee breach caused flooding and widespread destruction in most of Eastern St. Bernard Parish and parts of Plaquemines Parish. Residents were never adequately compensated for their losses.

=== Hurricane Katrina, 2005 ===
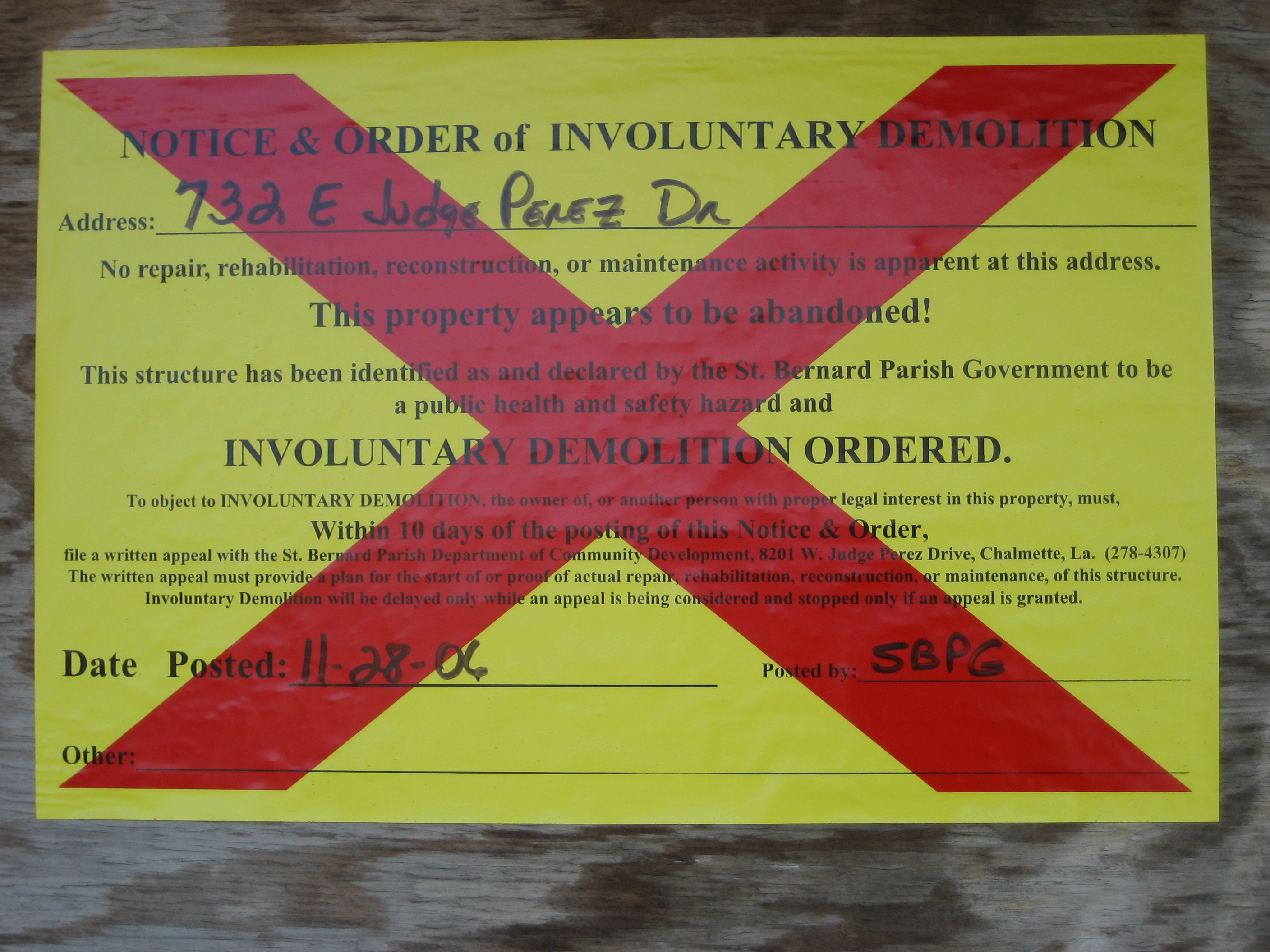
"Involuntary Demolition" notice, posted on buildings in St. Bernard Parish when there has been no significant effort to gut, secure, or repair the building over a year after Hurricane Katrina.

On August 29, 2005, St. Bernard was devastated by Hurricane Katrina. The storm damaged virtually every structure in the parish. The eye of Katrina passed over the eastern portion of the parish, pushing a 25-foot (7.6 m) storm surge into the Mississippi River Gulf Outlet ("MRGO"). This surge destroyed the parish levees. Almost the entire parish was flooded, with most areas left with between 5 and 15 feet (1.5–4.6 m) of standing water. The water rose suddenly and violently, during a period which witnesses reported as no more than fifteen minutes. In many areas, houses were smashed or washed off their foundations by a storm surge higher than the roofs.

For more than two months after the storm, much of the parish remained without proper services, including electricity, water, and sewage. Parish President Henry "Junior" Rodriguez declared all of the parish's homes unlivable. Emergency Communities offered one reason for hope in the first year after Hurricane Katrina. In the parking lot of a destroyed off-track betting parlor, EC built the Made with Love Cafe and Grill, a free kitchen and community center serving 1500 meals per day. Made with Love, housed in a geodesic dome, also offered food and clothing distribution, and emotionally supportive volunteers. Upon leaving, EC has offered logistical support for the founding of a new long-term Community Center of St Bernard.

As of late November 2005, it was estimated that the Parish had some 7,000 full-time residents, with some 20,000 commuting to spend the day working, cleaning up, or salvaging in the parish and spending their nights elsewhere. By mid-December some businesses had returned to the Parish, most notably the ExxonMobil plant in Chalmette and the Domino Sugar plant in Arabi, together with a handful of small local stores and businesses.

At the start of January 2006, it was estimated that some 8,000 people were living in the Parish. The H.O.P.E. Project, a collective of volunteer relief workers, founded itself in January 2006 in the empty shell of the Corinne Missionary Baptist Church in Violet, LA, providing the tools for rebuilding and community empowerment. Since June 2006, Camp Hope, located in Arabi, has been housing volunteers' assisting residents of St. Bernard Parish in their recovery from Hurricane Katrina. A grassroots organization, the St. Bernard Project, opened in March 2006. A fully volunteer-run organization funded by the United Way, they help residents get back into their homes by working on the houses, providing tools, support and where possible, funding.

As of October 2006, the population was estimated to be 25,489. After population losses due to Hurricane Katrina, the school was reopened for elementary grades for the 2006–2007 school year.

=== Hurricane Ida, 2021 ===
With the landfall of Hurricane Ida on August 29, 2021, St. Bernard Parish experienced heavy flooding. Two days before, local officials and weather experts advised citizens to prepare for the storm, warning that storm surge could reach as much as 11 feet. St. Bernard Parish President, Guy McInnis, stated he did not plan to issue a formal evacuation order.

== Geography ==
According to the U.S. Census Bureau, the parish has a total area of 2,158 square miles (5,590 km^{2}), of which 378 square miles (980 km^{2}) is land and 1,781 square miles (4,610 km^{2}) (83%) is water. It is the second largest parish in Louisiana by total area and has the largest percentage of area in water of any parish.

The parish of St. Bernard embraces numerous small islands. The parish is classed among the alluvial lands of the state. The ridges comprise the arable lands of the parish and have an area of 37,000 acres (150 km^{2}). The principal streams are the Bayous Terre aux Boeufs and La Loutre. There are numerous smaller streams which are efficient drainage canals. The dominant tree species is bald cypress, of which the most valuable trees have been cut and processed.

=== Bodies of water ===
- Lake Borgne (north)
- Mississippi River (southwest)
- Gulf of Mexico (east)

=== Major highways ===
- Louisiana Highway 39
- Louisiana Highway 46
- Louisiana Highway 47
- Louisiana Highway 300
- Louisiana Highway 624
- Louisiana Highway 625
- Louisiana Highway 1245

=== Adjacent counties and parishes ===
- Hancock County, Mississippi (north across Mississippi Sound)
- Harrison County, Mississippi (northeast across Chandeleur Sound and Mississippi Sound)
- Orleans Parish (northwest)
- Plaquemines Parish (south)
- St. Tammany Parish (northwest)

=== National protected areas ===
- Breton National Wildlife Refuge (part)
- Jean Lafitte National Historical Park (part, in Chalmette)

=== State park ===
- St. Bernard State Park

=== Communities ===
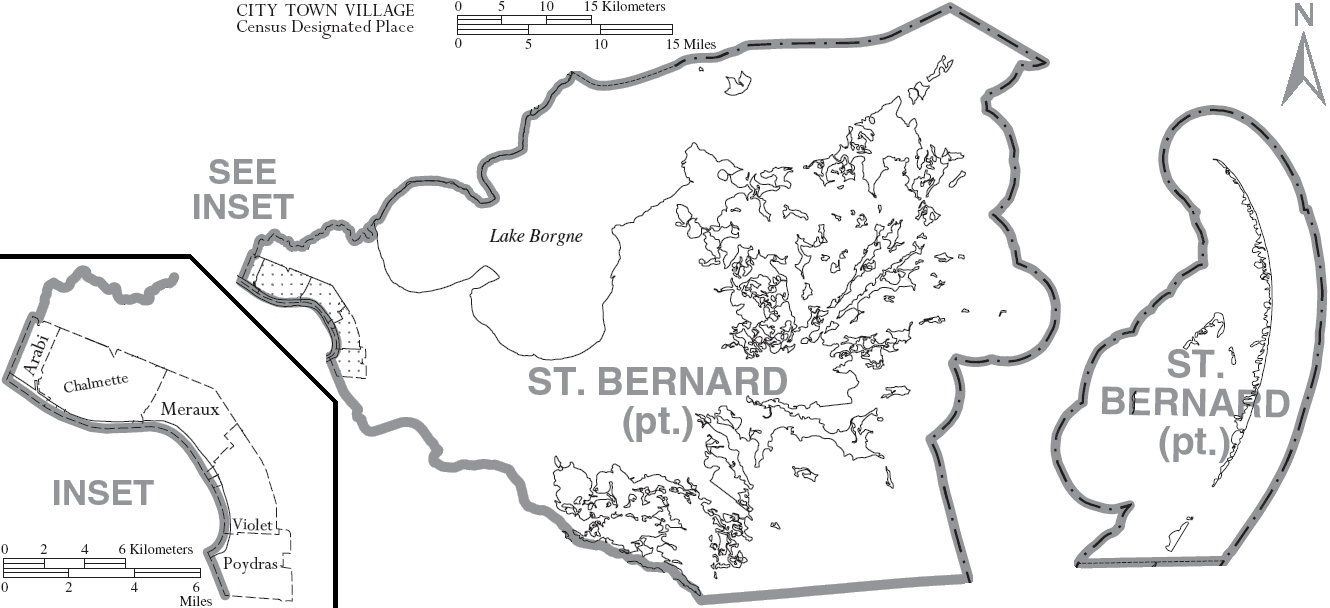
Map of St. Bernard Parish with municipal labels

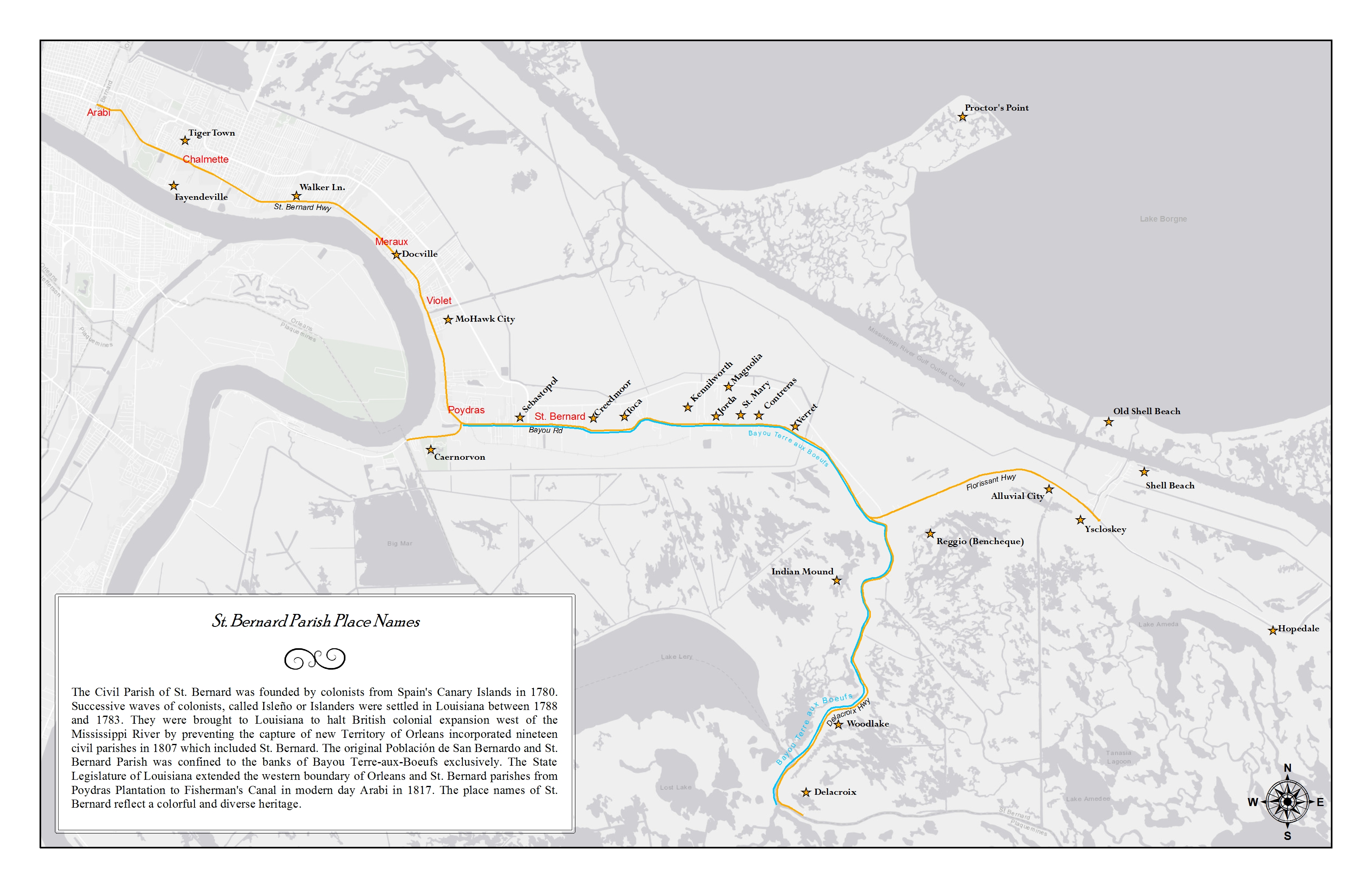
Historic place names in St. Bernard Parish

There are no incorporated areas in St. Bernard Parish.

==== Census-designated places ====
- Arabi
- Chalmette (parish seat)
- Delacroix
- Meraux
- Poydras
- Violet

==== Unincorporated communities ====
- Caernarvon
- Hopedale (La Chinche)
- Reggio (Bencheque)
- Saint Bernard
- Shell Beach
- Versailles
- Verret

==== Ghost towns ====
- Alluvial City
- Fazendeville
- Proctorville
- St. Malo

== Demographics ==
Historical population
Census	Pop.	Note	%±
1810	1,020		—
1820	2,635		158.3%
1830	3,356		27.4%
1840	3,237		−3.5%
1850	3,802		17.5%
1860	4,076		7.2%
1870	3,553		−12.8%
1880	4,405		24.0%
1890	4,326		−1.8%
1900	5,031		16.3%
1910	5,277		4.9%
1920	4,968		−5.9%
1930	6,512		31.1%
1940	7,280		11.8%
1950	11,087		52.3%
1960	32,186		190.3%
1970	51,185		59.0%
1980	64,097		25.2%
1990	66,631		4.0%
2000	67,229		0.9%
2010	35,897		−46.6%
2020	43,764		21.9%
2025 (est.)	45,642	▲	4.3%
U.S. Decennial Census; 1790-1960 1900-1990; 1990-2000 2010-2013

St. Bernard Parish, Louisiana – Racial and ethnic composition Note: the U.S. Census Bureau treats Hispanic/Latino as an ethnic category. This table excludes Latinos from the racial categories and assigns them to a separate category. Hispanics/Latinos may be of any race.
Race / Ethnicity (NH = Non-Hispanic)	Pop 1980	Pop 1990	Pop 2000	Pop 2010	Pop 2020	% 1980	% 1990	% 2000	% 2010	% 2020
White alone (NH)	55,976	58,424	56,723	24,607	23,165	87.33%	87.68%	84.37%	68.55%	52.93%
Black or African American alone (NH)	2,380	3,091	5,095	6,272	11,370	3.71%	4.64%	7.58%	17.47%	25.98%
Native American or Alaska Native alone (NH)	290	325	309	201	215	0.45%	0.49%	0.46%	0.56%	0.49%
Asian alone (NH)	289	579	872	678	972	0.45%	0.87%	1.30%	1.89%	2.22%
Native Hawaiian or Pacific Islander alone (NH)	x	x	6	10	6	x	x	0.01%	0.03%	0.01%
Other race alone (NH)	0	29	37	125	285	0.00%	0.04%	0.06%	0.35%	0.65%
Mixed race or Multiracial (NH)	x	x	762	695	1,741	x	x	1.13%	1.94%	3.98%
Hispanic or Latino (any race)	5,162	4,183	3,425	3,309	6,010	8.05%	6.28%	5.09%	9.22%	13.73%
Total	64,097	66,631	67,229	35,897	43,764	100.00%	100.00%	100.00%	100.00%	100.00%

The 2019 American Community Survey determined 46,266 people and 15,005 households lived in the parish. At the 2020 census, there were 43,764 people, down from the prior census estimates yet up from 2010's 35,897 people. The racial and ethnic makeup of the parish was 69.4% non-Hispanic white, 23.3% Black and African American, 0.4% American Indian and Alaska Native, 2.5% Asian, 0.1% Native Hawaiian and other Pacific Islander, 2.0% some other race, and 2.4% from two or more races in 2019; an estimated 10.1% of the population were Hispanic and Latino American of any race in 2019. In 2020, the racial and ethnic composition was 52.93% non-Hispanic white, 25.98% Black or African American, 0.49% American Indian and Alaska Native, 2.22% Asian, 0.01% Pacific Islander, 4.63% two or more races, and 13.73% Hispanic and Latino American of any race, reflecting the trend of diversification in the U.S.

Of the population, 90.7% spoke English at home, 5.5% Spanish, 1.6% other Indo-European languages, 1.6% Asian and Pacific Islander languages, and 0.7% other languages in 2019.

Among the 15,005 households, the median age was 34.2. Approximately 73.2% of the population were aged 18 and older, 7.4% under 5 years of age, and 11.1% aged 65 and older. The parish population was spread out in 17,035 housing units and there was a home-ownership rate of 67.7% compared to 64.0% nationwide from 2015 to 2019. The median housing value was $151,300, and median gross rent was $951. There was a median household income of $44,661; males had a median income of $48,252 versus $33,302 for females. An estimated 26.2% of the parish lived at or below the poverty line.

Christianity was the parish's largest religion according to the Association of Religion Data Archives in 2020. Most of the religiously affiliated population are members of the Roman Catholic Church via the Roman Catholic Archdiocese of New Orleans, with 14,439 adherents as of 2020. Historically common throughout the state, Baptists were the second-largest Christian group in the parish; Southern Baptists made up 1,012 members and National Missionary Baptists numbered 1,230. Non/inter-denominational Protestants spread among independent congregationalist, Bible, and United or Uniting churches numbered 900 in 2020 per the Association of Religion Data Archives.

== Education ==
Public schools in the parish are operated by the St. Bernard Parish Public Schools school district.

Due to Hurricane Katrina (2005), the parish's 20 plus public schools were consolidated as one school, the St. Bernard Unified School, or SBUS. St. Bernard Unified School broke up into several different schools in the 2006–2007 school year.

The parish is served by Nunez Community College.

Additionally Delgado Community College states that its Sidney Collier Campus in East New Orleans is in proximity to St. Bernard Parish.

St. Bernard Parish also has only one Catholic school, Our Lady of Prompt Succor of the Roman Catholic Archdiocese of New Orleans. There is also one private Montessori school, Classique Academy.

== Sports and recreation ==
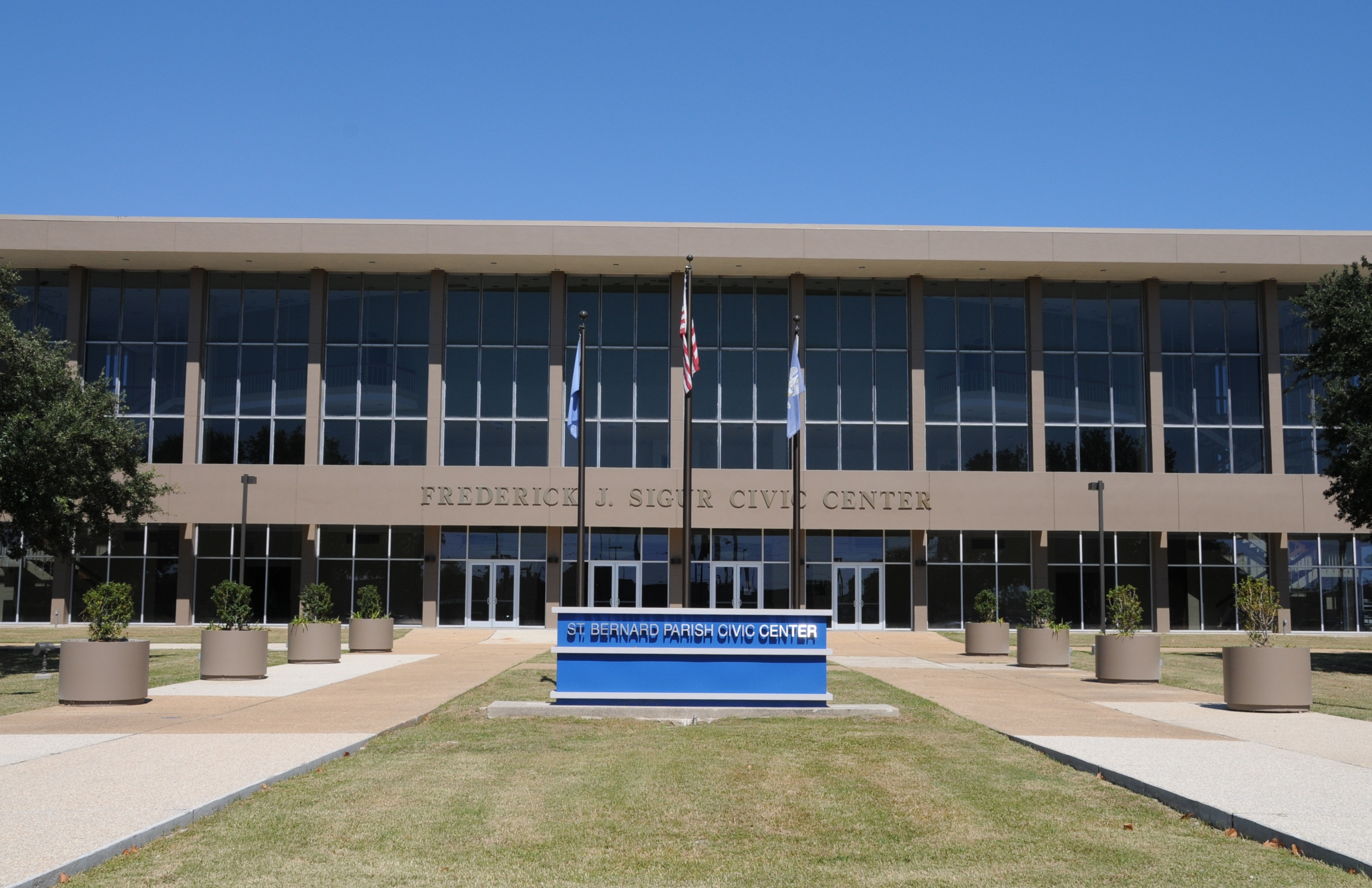
Frederick J. Sigur Civic Center

- Frederick J. Sigur Civic Center - Auditorium and ballroom
- Val Riess Recreation Complex - baseball fields, softball fields and multi-purpose building

== Media ==
While St. Bernard is served mainly by New Orleans media sources, such as a local section of The Times-Picayune, the Parish does have multiple newspapers. The St. Bernard Voice, established in 1890, serves as the official journal of the parish. The St. Bernard News was established in 1967 and publishes weekly.

Formerly published newspapers that served the parish include the St. Bernard Eagle and the St. Bernard Weekly Eagle which published in the 1870s through 1884 in Arabi, Progress which published from Stock Landing (Arabi) in 1888–1889, St. Bernard Protector 1925–1926, and the St. Bernard Guide which published from 1982 to 1986.

== Politics ==
Up to 1944, like all of Louisiana, St. Bernard Parish was almost unanimously Democratic. However, like neighbouring Plaquemines Parish, St. Bernard Parish was ruled by the notorious political boss Leander Perez, who directed voters away from the national party to Strom Thurmond in 1948 and to Dwight D. Eisenhower in the ensuing decade. Apart from giving almost seventy percent of its ballots to segregationist George Wallace in 1968, St. Bernard Parish has remained strongly Republican ever since then. Although Jimmy Carter in 1976 and Bill Clinton in 1996 did carry it by plurality, Franklin D. Roosevelt remains the last Democratic presidential nominee to gain an absolute majority.

United States presidential election results for St. Bernard Parish, Louisiana
Year	Republican		Democratic		Third party(ies)	
Year	No.	%	No.	%	No.	%
1912	17	6.80%	221	88.40%	12	4.80%
1916	23	5.88%	363	92.84%	5	1.28%
1920	56	13.53%	358	86.47%	0	0.00%
1924	13	2.41%	526	97.59%	0	0.00%
1928	77	3.16%	2,359	96.84%	0	0.00%
1932	106	6.50%	1,525	93.50%	0	0.00%
1936	25	1.09%	2,269	98.91%	0	0.00%
1940	110	6.03%	1,715	93.97%	0	0.00%
1944	80	3.77%	2,044	96.23%	0	0.00%
1948	107	4.38%	91	3.72%	2,247	91.90%
1952	2,267	51.71%	2,117	48.29%	0	0.00%
1956	3,648	50.55%	3,283	45.49%	286	3.96%
1960	1,431	13.07%	4,660	42.56%	4,858	44.37%
1964	8,055	56.61%	6,175	43.39%	0	0.00%
1968	3,486	18.32%	2,485	13.06%	13,056	68.62%
1972	15,198	77.69%	3,189	16.30%	1,176	6.01%
1976	12,707	47.94%	12,969	48.92%	832	3.14%
1980	19,410	60.53%	11,367	35.45%	1,288	4.02%
1984	24,428	74.80%	8,076	24.73%	153	0.47%
1988	19,609	61.79%	11,406	35.94%	721	2.27%
1992	16,131	48.97%	12,305	37.36%	4,502	13.67%
1996	13,549	43.86%	14,312	46.33%	3,031	9.81%
2000	16,255	56.79%	11,682	40.82%	684	2.39%
2004	19,597	65.68%	9,956	33.37%	285	0.96%
2008	9,643	71.21%	3,491	25.78%	407	3.01%
2012	8,501	60.92%	5,059	36.25%	395	2.83%
2016	10,237	64.73%	4,960	31.36%	618	3.91%
2020	11,179	63.34%	6,151	34.85%	320	1.81%
2024	11,033	63.80%	5,967	34.51%	292	1.69%

== Notable people ==
Emo E

- Renato Beluche
- P. G. T. Beauregard
- Walter Boasso
- A. G. Crowe
- Chris Dier
- Albert Estopinal
- Frank Fernández Jr.
- Ray Garofalo
- Alcide "Yellow" Núñez
- Samuel B. Nunez, Jr.
- Irvan "Puco" Pérez
- Leander Perez
- François Marie, Chevalier de Reggio
- Mitchell Robinson
- Junior Rodriguez
- Jean Saint Malo
- Elmer R. Tapper
- Jacques Villeré
- Norris Weese
- Tommy Wiseau

== See also ==
- National Register of Historic Places listings in St. Bernard Parish, Louisiana
- Louisiana International Terminal
