= Shell Beach, Louisiana =

- Unincorporated community
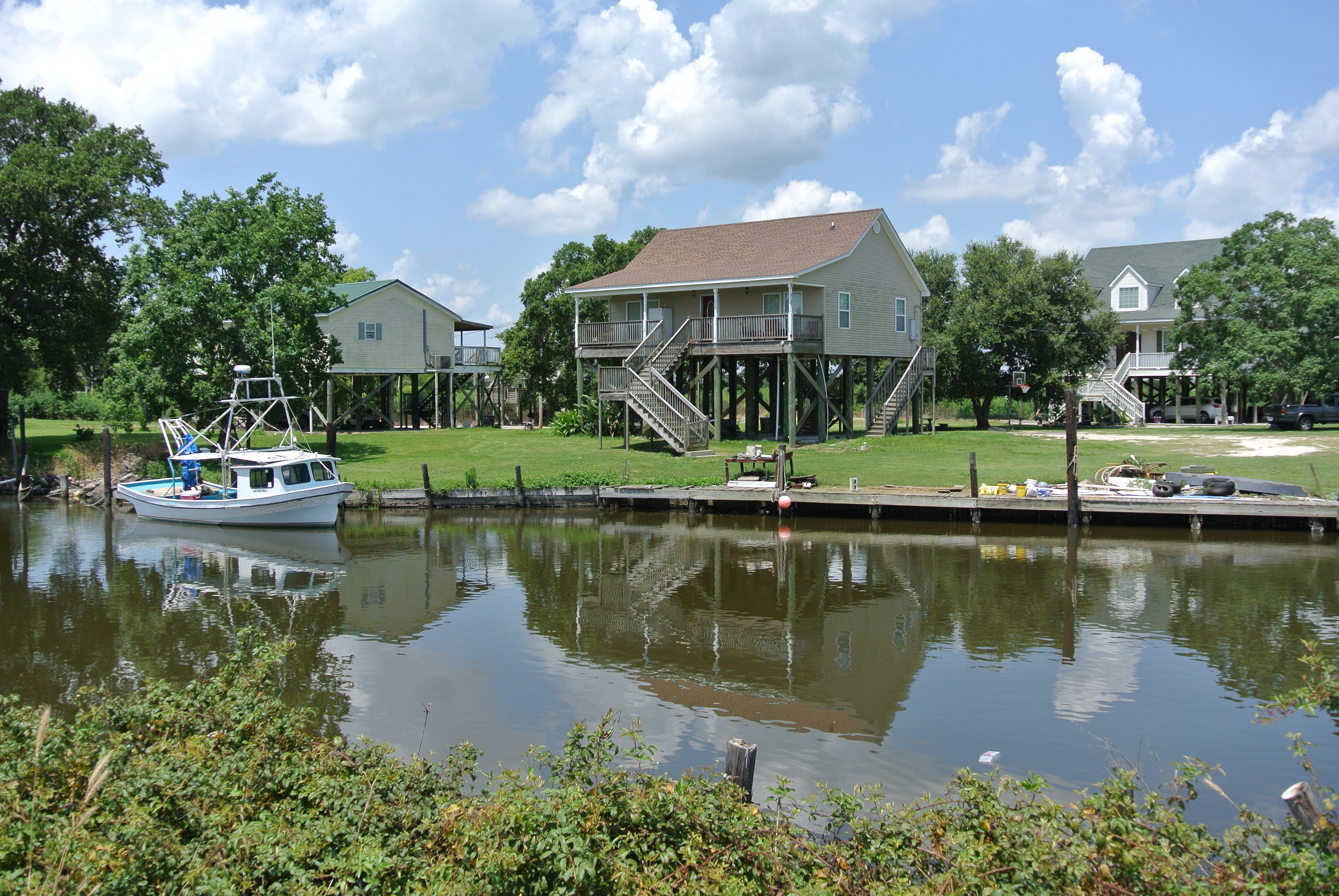
- Houses in Shell Beach, July 2015

- Location within Louisiana Location within the United States
- Coordinates: 29°51′12″N 89°40′46″W
- Country: United States
- State: Louisiana
- Parish: St. Bernard
- Elevation: 3 ft (0.91 m)
- Time zone: UTC−06:00 (Central (CST))
  - Summer (DST): UTC−05:00 (CDT)
- Area code: 504
- GNIS feature ID: 1628213

Shell Beach is an unincorporated community in St. Bernard Parish, Louisiana, United States. The community is located on the Mississippi River – Gulf Outlet Canal near Lake Borgne, 18 miles (29 km) east-southeast of Chalmette.

Fort Proctor, which is listed on the National Register of Historic Places, is located near Shell Beach.
