= Algiers Point–Canal Street Ferry =

River ferry in Louisiana, United States

Coordinates: 29.951°N 90.059°W

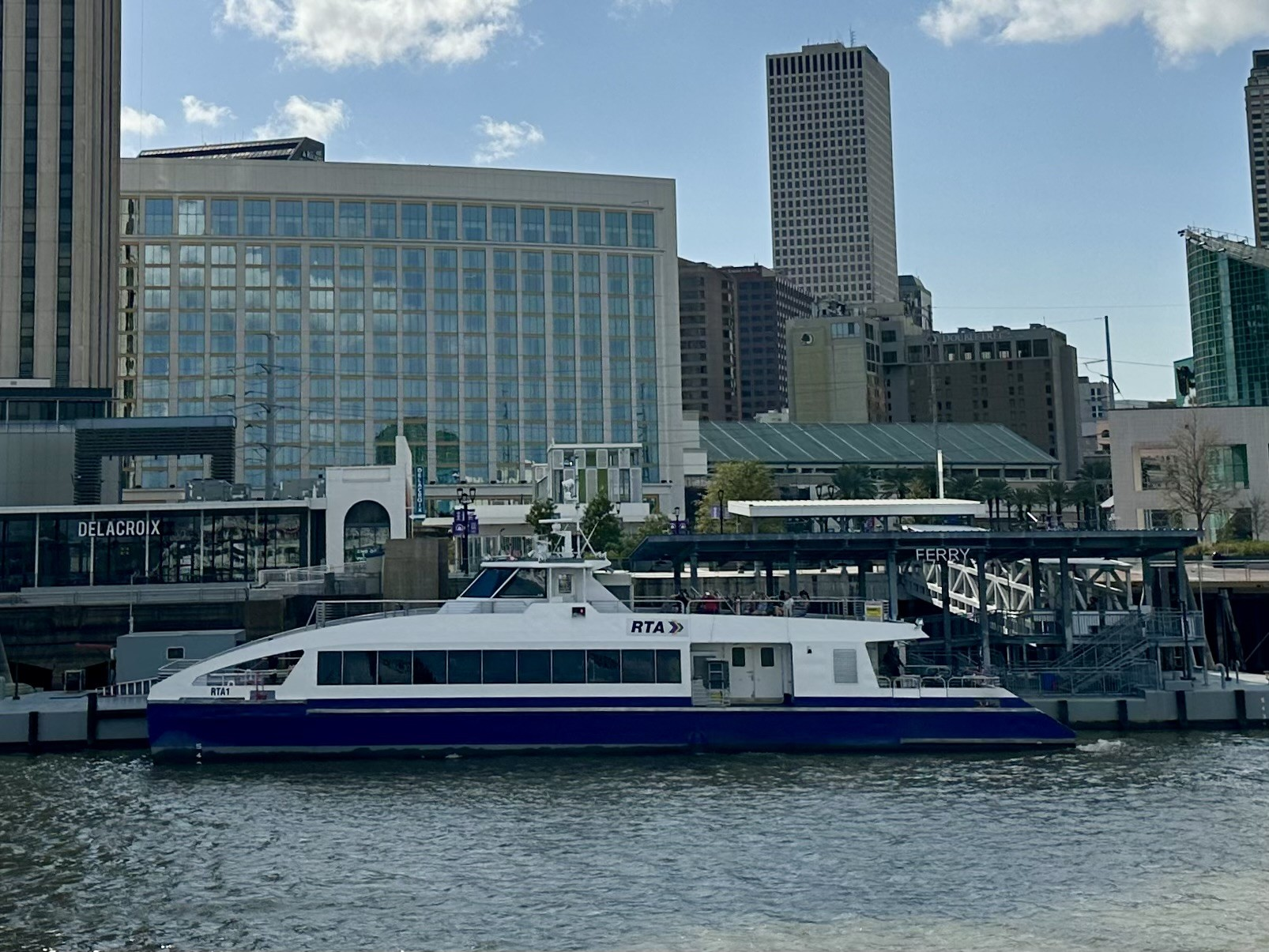
- Algiers Point–Canal Street Ferry RTA1 at the Canal Street terminal
- Locale: New Orleans, Louisiana
- Waterway: Mississippi River
- Transit type: Passenger-only ferry
- Operator: New Orleans Regional Transit Authority
- Began operation: 1827
- No. of vessels: 2 (RTA1 & RTA2)
- Route ID: 1
- Connections at Canal Street
- Tram: 47 48 49
- Bus: RTA: 202
- Airport: Louis Armstrong New Orleans International Airport via 202
- Connections at Algiers Point
- Bus: RTA: 103

The Algiers Point–Canal Street Ferry is a passenger ferry service across the Mississippi River in New Orleans, Louisiana, United States. It connects the foot of Canal Street in the Central Business District on the east bank with Algiers Point in the neighborhood of Algiers on the west bank.

The ferry is operated by the New Orleans Regional Transit Authority and serves pedestrians only. The agency also operates the Chalmette–Lower Algiers Ferry.

== Operation ==
Ferries operate daily. Departures from Algiers are scheduled on the hour and half-hour beginning at 6:00 a.m., while departures from Canal Street occur at fifteen and forty-five minutes past the hour. The final departure from Canal Street is at 8:45 p.m. Sunday through Thursday and 10:45 p.m. on Friday and Saturday.

== History ==
Regular ferry service between Canal Street and Algiers was established in 1827, providing an important connection across the Mississippi River between downtown New Orleans and communities on the west bank.

The first Algiers ferry terminal collapsed into the river in 1920. A replacement terminal later burned on January 22, 1952.

Ferry operations were managed by the Crescent City Connection Division of the Louisiana Department of Transportation and Development after 1960. While the opening of the Crescent City Connection bridge reduced reliance on ferries, though passenger service between Algiers Point and Canal Street was preserved through public advocacy.

Construction of a new Algiers terminal began in 1979 as part of a $27 million ferry improvement program by the bridge authority. The facility opened on June 16, 1980.

Following Hurricane Katrina in 2005, ferry service hours were reduced, with the final daily departures scheduled at 8 p.m. Operating hours were extended again in August 2007 after advocacy from the New Orleans City Council and community groups including Friends of the Ferry.

Until 2013, ferry operations were funded largely through toll revenues from the Crescent City Connection bridges. When toll collection ended that year, the Crescent City Connection Division was dissolved, eliminating the system's primary source of operating revenue. The resulting fiscal crisis led to reduced service hours, the introduction of passenger fares, and the discontinuation of the nearby Canal Street–Gretna Ferry route, which had shared the Canal Street terminal.

Responsibility for the service transferred to the New Orleans Regional Transit Authority in 2014, when a one-way fare of $2 was introduced after decades of free service.

In 2017 the RTA ordered two new pedestrian-only ferries, designed by BMT and built by Metal Shark in Jeanerette, Louisiana. The 105-foot (32 m) aluminum catamaran vessels, each capable of carrying 149 passengers, were funded partly through a $15.2 million award from the Federal Transit Administration's Passenger Ferry Grant Program, with an additional $3.8 million provided by the state of Louisiana. The vessels, RTA1 and RTA2, were delivered in 2018 but entered service only after regulatory and operational issues were resolved. RTA2 began revenue service on October 10, 2020, followed by RTA1 on December 15, 2020.

The existing ferry terminals, built to accommodate both vehicles and pedestrians, were incompatible with the new passenger-only ferries and closed in 2020. Ferry operations used ramps to reach a barge where passengers could access the ferries.

In August 2023, a new Canal Street Ferry Terminal opened at the foot of Canal Street. The $43.5 million facility replaced the previous terminal with an ADA-compliant structure featuring a 4,300-square-foot terminal building, a 13,200-square-foot wharf, and a pedestrian bridge designed to improve connections with nearby transit services.

In 2025, the RTA began a $26 million renovation of the Algiers ferry terminal. The project includes a covered passenger boarding ramp, new administrative offices, public restrooms, and a community plaza with space for events, dining, and retail. New landing barges will also be installed to support ferry operations. The renovation is funded primarily through approximately $23 million in grants from the Federal Transit Administration, with about $2 million in local matching funds provided by the RTA. Construction is expected to be completed by early 2027.

== See also ==
- List of crossings of the Lower Mississippi River
