= Chalmette–Lower Algiers Ferry =

Ferry in Louisiana, United States

Coordinates: 29.924°N 89.972°W

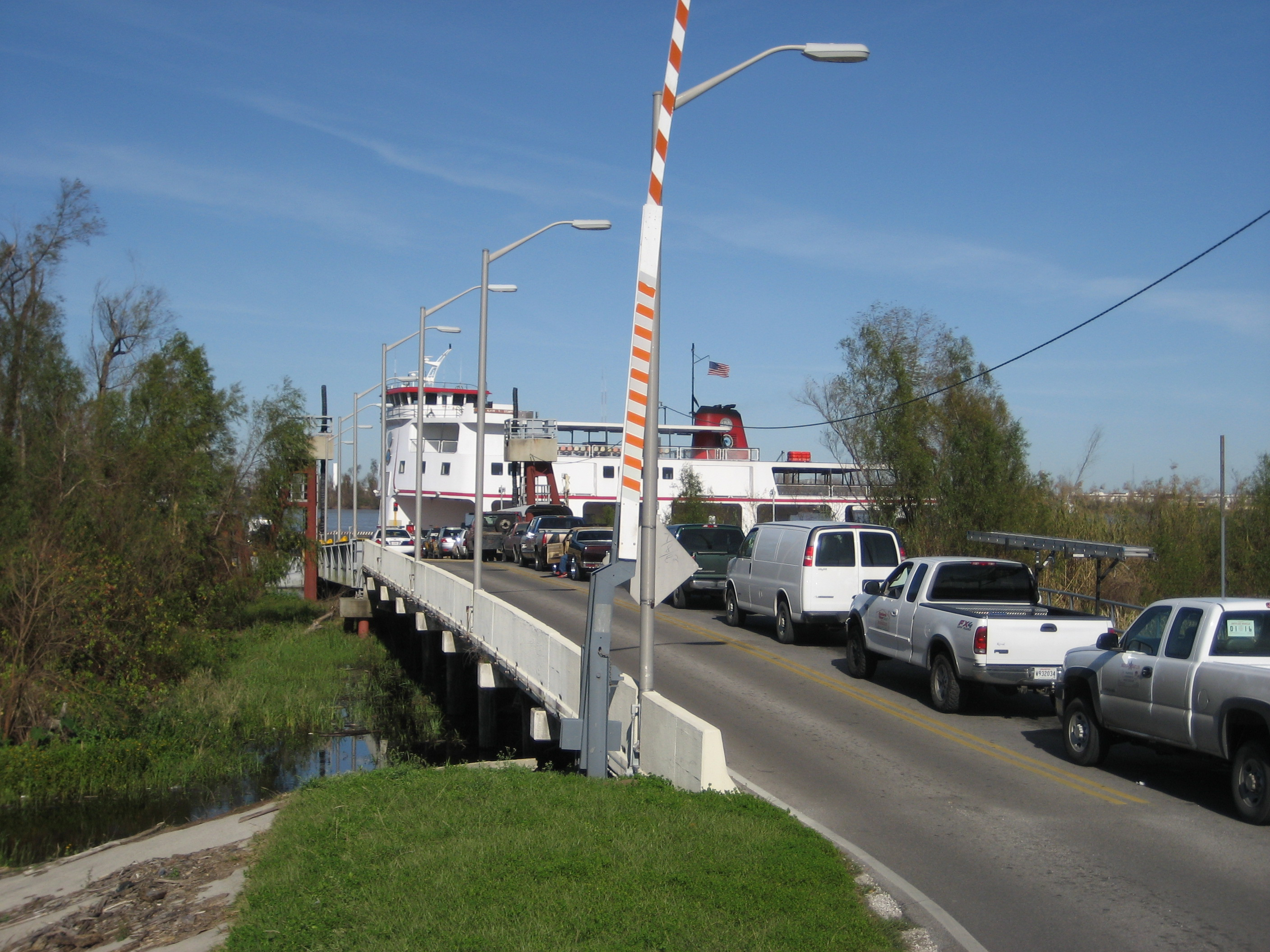
- Vehicles lining up to board the Thomas Jefferson on Algiers side
- Locale: New Orleans, Louisiana
- Waterway: Mississippi River
- Transit type: Ferry
- Operator: New Orleans Regional Transit Authority
- Began operation: 1969
- No. of vessels: 1 (Thomas Jefferson)
- Route ID: 4

The Chalmette–Lower Algiers Ferry is a ferry service across the Mississippi River in Louisiana, United States. It connects Chalmette on the east bank and the New Orleans neighborhood of Algiers on the west bank.

The ferry is operated by the New Orleans Regional Transit Authority. The agency also operates the Algiers Point–Canal Street Ferry.

== History ==
The service was initiated in 1969 by the Crescent City Connection Division of the Louisiana Department of Transportation and Development.

The ferry crossing has seen reduced use, especially among residents of Arabi at the western end of St. Bernard Parish, since the opening of the second span of the Crescent City Connection in 1988.

Until 2013, ferry operations were funded largely through toll revenues from the Crescent City Connection bridges. When toll collection ended that year, the Crescent City Connection Division was dissolved, eliminating the system's primary source of operating revenue. Responsibility for the service transferred to the New Orleans Regional Transit Authority in 2014.

== See also ==
- List of crossings of the Lower Mississippi River
