= St. Bernard Urban Rapid Transit =

Public transport operator in Louisiana, United States

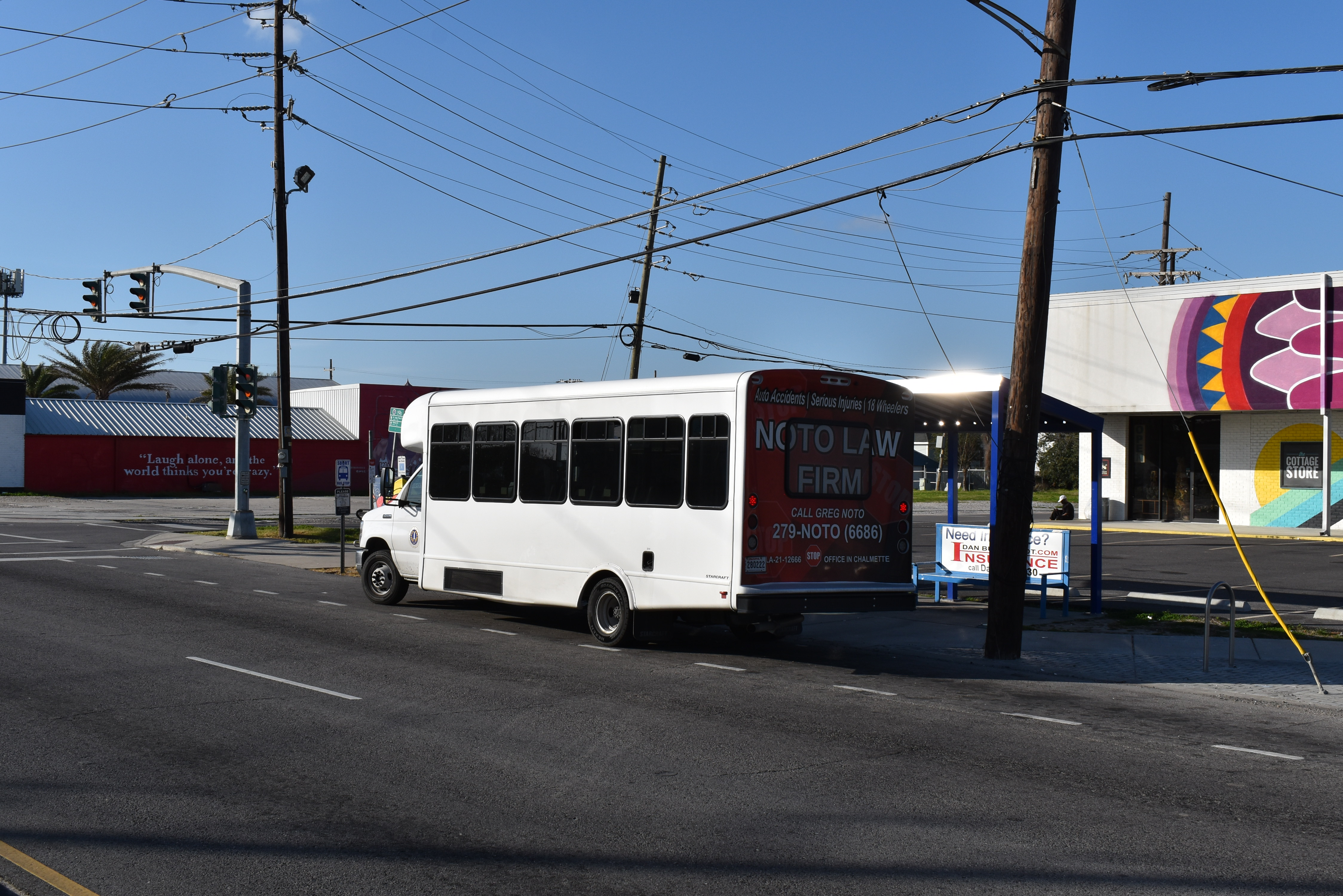
- An SBURT bus on St. Claude Ave.
- Parent: St. Bernard Parish
- Headquarters: 120 Agriculture St.
- Locale: Chalmette, Louisiana, United States
- Service area: St. Bernard Parish, Louisiana
- Service type: Public transport bus service

St. Bernard Urban Rapid Transit (SBURT) is the operator of public transportation in St. Bernard Parish, Louisiana, United States, a suburb of New Orleans. The agency services 45,000 people, with over 92,000 annual unlinked trips in 2017. Although SBURT is in geographic proximity to the New Orleans Regional Transit Authority, it operates independently, with a separate and non-transferable fare structure.

== Route information ==
St. Bernard Urban Rapid Transit operates one line between Arabi and Poydras, Louisiana, Monday through Friday, every 40 minutes from 5:55 a.m. to 7:50 p.m., for $1. SBURT offers pre-arranged and on demand route alterations to St. Bernard Hospital, Trist Middle School, J. F. Gauthier School, St. Bernard State Park, and Fanz Trailer Park, as well as route deviations for ADA eligible passengers.

== See also ==
- List of bus transit systems in the United States
- Jefferson Transit
