= Crescent City Connection Division =

The Crescent City Connection Division (CCCD) was an agency within the Louisiana Department of Transportation and Development (DOTD) responsible for planning, constructing, operating, maintaining, and policing Mississippi River crossings in Jefferson, Orleans, and St. Bernard parishes.

Before 1989, the agency was known as the Mississippi River Bridge Authority (MRBA) and was responsible only for the Greater New Orleans Bridge (later renamed the Crescent City Connection), one of the busiest bridges in the United States, carrying more than 33 million vehicles annually.

The division oversaw the Crescent City Connection bridges and three ferry routes: Jackson Avenue–Gretna, Algiers Point–Canal Street, and Chalmette–Lower Algiers. The Canal Street ferry was acquired in 1960, followed by the Jackson Avenue ferry in 1965. The Chalmette ferry service was initiated in 1969. The agency also operated the Crescent City Connection Police Department to enforce laws on its properties.

In 1989, the CCCD was given oversight of the Huey P. Long Bridge and the Westbank Expressway. Toll collection on the Crescent City Connection bridges ended in 2013, eliminating the division's primary source of revenue and leading to its dissolution. Responsibility for the bridges was transferred to the DOTD, ferry operations were transferred to the New Orleans Regional Transit Authority, and law enforcement duties were assumed by the Louisiana State Police.

== Police ==
Crescent City Connection Police Department patch

The Crescent City Connection Police Department (CCCPD) was responsible for policing properties operated by the CCCD including the ferry routes and approximately 14 miles (23 km) of highway comprising the approaches to the Crescent City Connection; the U.S. Route 90/U.S. Route 90 Business (Westbank Expressway) interchange east to the Broad Street overpass of Interstate 10 (Pontchartrain Expressway). The department also patrolled General De Gaulle Drive, Mardi Gras Boulevard, Calliope Street, and other surface streets providing access to the bridge.

The CCCPD was authorized by an act of the Louisiana Legislature. Officers had the same law enforcement powers as sheriffs of Jefferson Parish and St. Bernard Parish and as police officers in New Orleans, Gretna, and Westwego. These powers applied on all properties under the jurisdiction of the CCCD, including the Crescent City Connection bridges, the Huey P. Long Bridge, the Westbank Expressway, the ferry system, and adjacent public rights-of-way.

As part of the wind-down of CCCD operations, the CCCPD was transferred to the Louisiana State Police on December 24, 2012. Officers continued wearing CCCPD uniforms and using existing marked vehicles until December 31, 2012, after which they transitioned to uniforms and vehicles of the Louisiana Department of Public Safety & Corrections.

All former CCCPD officers and employees were offered positions within the Louisiana Department of Public Safety & Corrections or the Louisiana State Police. Bridge and expressway patrol duties are now carried out by the Louisiana DPS Police CCC Detail, while ferry landing patrols are handled by the New Orleans Police Department and the Gretna Police Department.
