= Jackson Street Ferry =

Jackson Street Ferry may refer to:

- Jackson Avenue – Gretna Ferry, a ferry across the Mississippi River, connecting New Orleans and Gretna, Louisiana, replaced in 2009 by the Gretna–Canal Street Ferry route
- Jackson Street Ferry, earlier name of Gouverneur Street Ferry, a ferry route connecting Manhattan and Brooklyn, 1817–1857
