= Jefferson Transit =

Jefferson Transit may refer to:

- Jefferson Transit (Louisiana) in Jefferson Parish, Louisiana
- Jefferson Transit (Washington) in Jefferson County, Washington State
- Birmingham-Jefferson County Transit Authority in Jefferson County, Alabama
