= Jefferson Parish Transit =

Bus network serving Jefferson Parish, Louisiana, United States

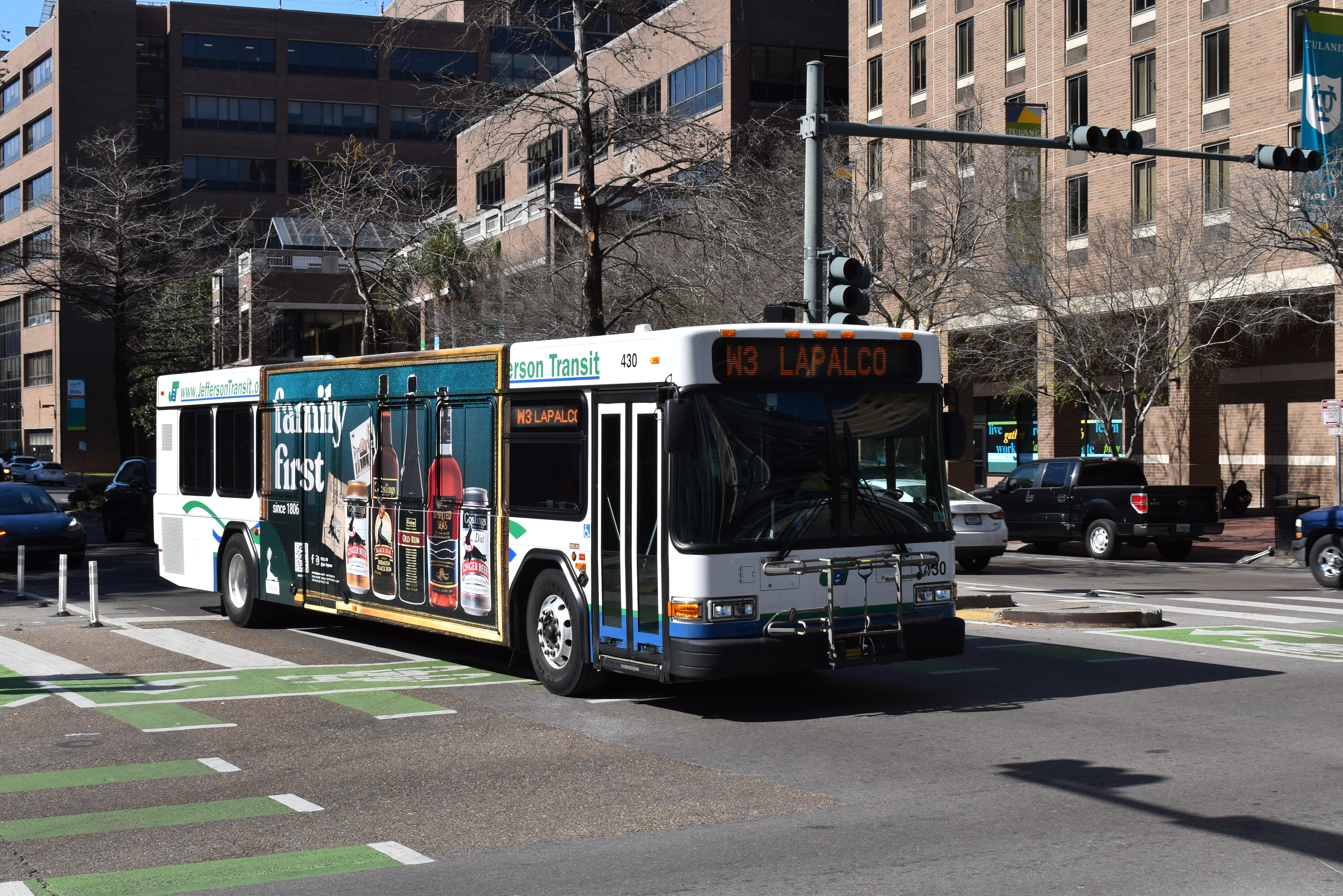
- Headquarters: 118 David Drive
- Locale: Metairie, Louisiana
- Service area: Jefferson Parish, Louisiana
- Service type: bus service
- Routes: 13
- Fuel type: Diesel
- Operator: Transdev
- Website: jptransit.org

Jefferson Parish Transit, formerly known as Jefferson Transit, is a public transportation provider in Jefferson Parish, Louisiana. It serves the most heavily suburbanized areas of Greater New Orleans, providing both local service and commuter access to New Orleans Central Business District.

== Bus routes ==
As of 2026, Jefferson Parish Transit operates seven Eastbank and six Westbank routes.

#	Name	Terminal 1	Terminal 2	Length	via	Notes
E1	Veterans-Airport	Kenner; Louis Armstrong International Airport	Navarre; Cemeteries Transit Hub	11.7 mi (18.8 km)	Veterans Blvd, Pontchartrain Expy	
E2	Airline Drive	Kenner; Kenner Terminal Parking Garage	Downtown; Tulane & Loyola	11.6 mi (18.7 km)	US-61, Airline Dr, Tulane Ave	
E3	Jefferson Highway	Kenner; 3rd St & Coleman Pl	Fontainebleau; Claiborne & Carrollton	11.5 mi (18.5 km)	Jefferson Highway	
E5	Causeway	Metairie; East Jefferson General Hospital	Jefferson; Causeway & Jefferson Hwy	6.1 mi (9.8 km)	Causeway Blvd	
E8	Elmwood	Metairie; East Jefferson General Hospital	Elmwood; Jefferson Hwy & Spur	8.0 mi (12.9 km)	West Esplanade Ave, Clearview Pkwy	
E9	Williams	Kenner; Treasure Chest Casino / Pontchartrain Center	Kenner; Daniel St & 3rd	5.2 mi (8.4 km)	Williams Blvd	E9 & E201 are combined on Sundays
E201	Kenner Loop	Kenner; Williams & 33rd St	Kenner; Veterans & Helena	9.8 mi (15.8 km)	West Esplanade Ave, Loyola Dr, 31st St	Operates in a loop; E9 & E201 are combined on Sundays
W1	Avondale	Waggaman; Senate & Capitol	Marrero; Walkertown Terminal	11.1 mi (17.9 km)	US-90, Westbank Expy, Nicolle Blvd	
W2	Westbank Expressway	Estelle; Lafitte-Larose & Highland Meadows	Downtown; Tulane & Loyola	14.5 mi (23.3 km)	Ames Blvd, Barataria Blvd, Westbank Expy	
W3	Lapalco	Westwego; Lapalco & Victory	Downtown; Tulane & Loyola	15.2 mi (24.5 km)	Lapalco Blvd, Manhattan Blvd, Westbank Expy	
W6	Gretna Local	Gretna; Gretna Ferry	Algiers Point; Algiers Ferry Terminal	6.0 mi (9.7 km)	4th Street, L.B. Landry Ave, Westbank Expy	Shown as W6A & W6G on some digital platforms
W8	Terrytown	Gretna; Wilty Terminal	Gretna; Oakdale Playground	6.9 mi (11.1 km)	Terry Pkwy, Behrman Hwy, Wall Blvd	
W10	Huey P. Long	Elmwood; Elmwood Park & Yenni Building	Marrero; Walkertown Terminal	8.7 mi (14.0 km)	Huey P. Long Bridge, 4th St	

== On-demand zone ==
In addition to the fixed-route service, there is also the "Move Metairie On-Demand Zone" that replaced the E4 Metairie Road bus and the "Moving Kenner On-Demand Zone" that replaced former sections of E201. The on-demand services are provided via Lyft.

== Hurricane evacuation plan ==
Jefferson Parish Transit operates a special "Hurricane Evacuation System" with modified routes when the parish is under evacuation orders due to an impending severe hurricane.

== See also ==
- List of bus transit systems in the United States
- New Orleans Regional Transit Authority
- St. Bernard Urban Rapid Transit
