= Jackson Avenue–Gretna Ferry =

Coordinates: 29.921°N 90.070°W

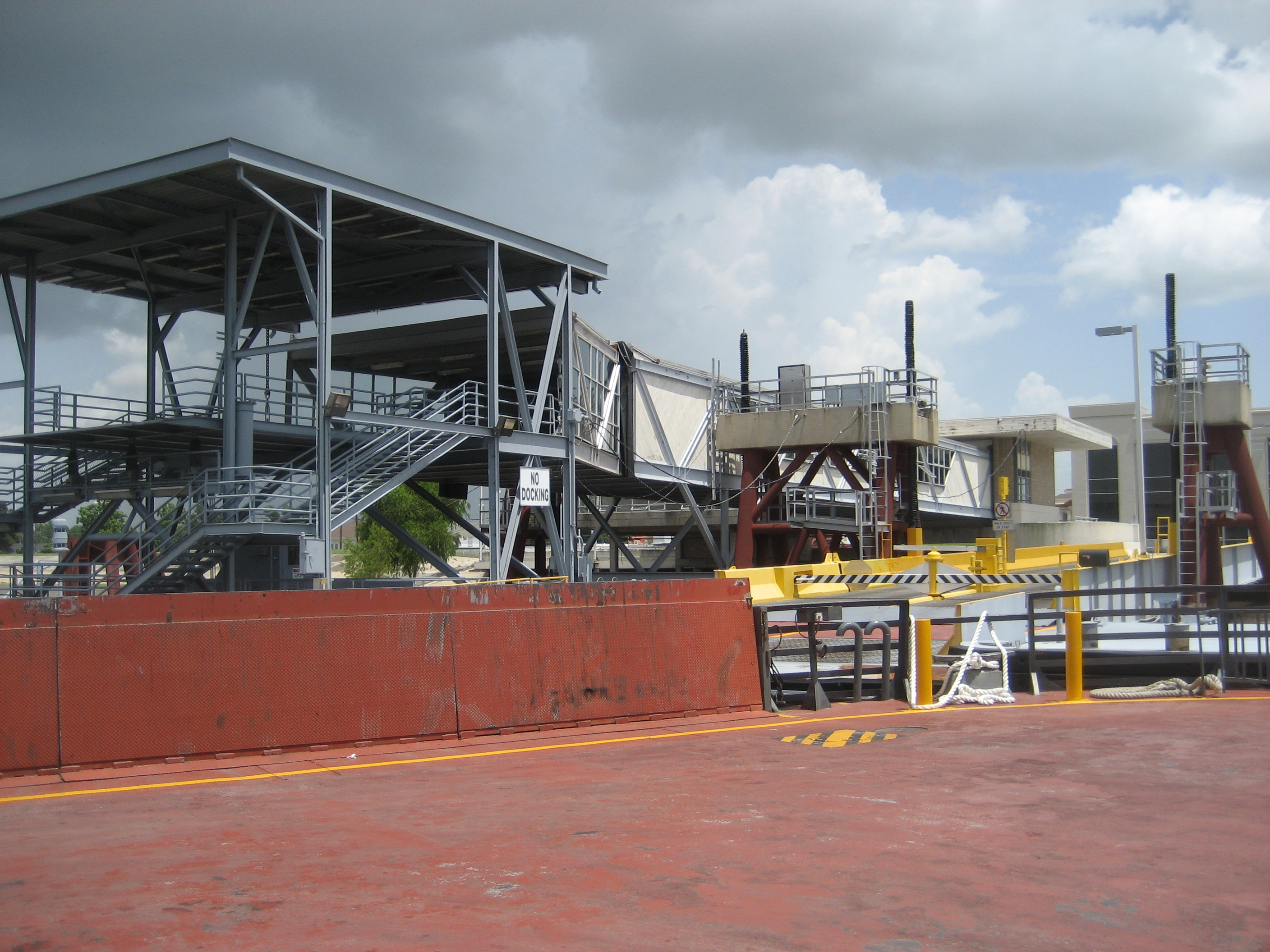
- Locale: New Orleans, Louisiana
- Waterway: Mississippi River
- Transit type: Ferry
- Operator: Crescent City Connection Division, Louisiana Department of Transportation and Development
- Ended operation: September 28, 2009
- No. of terminals: Jackson Avenue, New Orleans; Huey P. Long Avenue, Gretna
- Website: Crescent City Connection Ferries

The Jackson Avenue–Gretna ferry was a ferry across the Mississippi River in the U.S. state of Louisiana, connecting Jackson Avenue in New Orleans with Huey P. Long Avenue in Gretna. It carried automobiles for $1.00; bicycles and pedestrians for free. The Crescent City Connection Division of the Louisiana Department of Transportation and Development operated the ferry on weekdays from 06:00 to 20:45.

== History ==
The ferry carried U.S. Highway 90 during 1926–1928 and 1930–1937, until the Huey P. Long Bridge and subsequent improvements to Jefferson Highway were completed. The original Louisiana Highway 2, at first co-signed with U.S. 90, utilized the ferry crossing until the 1955 Louisiana Highway renumbering, followed by the modern Louisiana Highway 23. The terminus of LA 23 has since been truncated to the west bank of the Mississippi River.

The historic ferry route ended on September 28, 2009, replaced by the Gretna–Canal Street ferry route. The Gretna ferry's east bank landing temporarily shifted from Jackson Avenue to Canal Street, carrying only pedestrians and bicycles. The service was soon terminated, and the Gretna ferry terminal is currently (April, 2017) being converted into a river cruise ship terminal, which will be the home port for the French America Line's riverboat, MV Louisiane.

== Status of the Gretna Ferry Terminal ==
As noted above, the French America Line (FAL) intended to use the former Gretna Ferry Terminal as the home for its flagship riverboat. A widespread avalanche of press notices announced this development and generated an almost immediate response from prospective customers. The ship, a paddle-wheel steamboat, was built in 2000 by Vigor Works of Portland, Oregon and christened, MV Columbia Queen, apparently intended to cruise the Columbia River. In 2016, FAL purchased the ship from the U.S. Maritime Administration, and brought it to Louisiana for a complete refit in a drydock, then renamed it, with the intent of cruising the Mississippi and Ohio rivers. It was inaugurated in August 2016.

== See also ==
- List of crossings of the Lower Mississippi River
