= New Orleans Regional Transit Authority =

Public transit operator in New Orleans, Louisiana

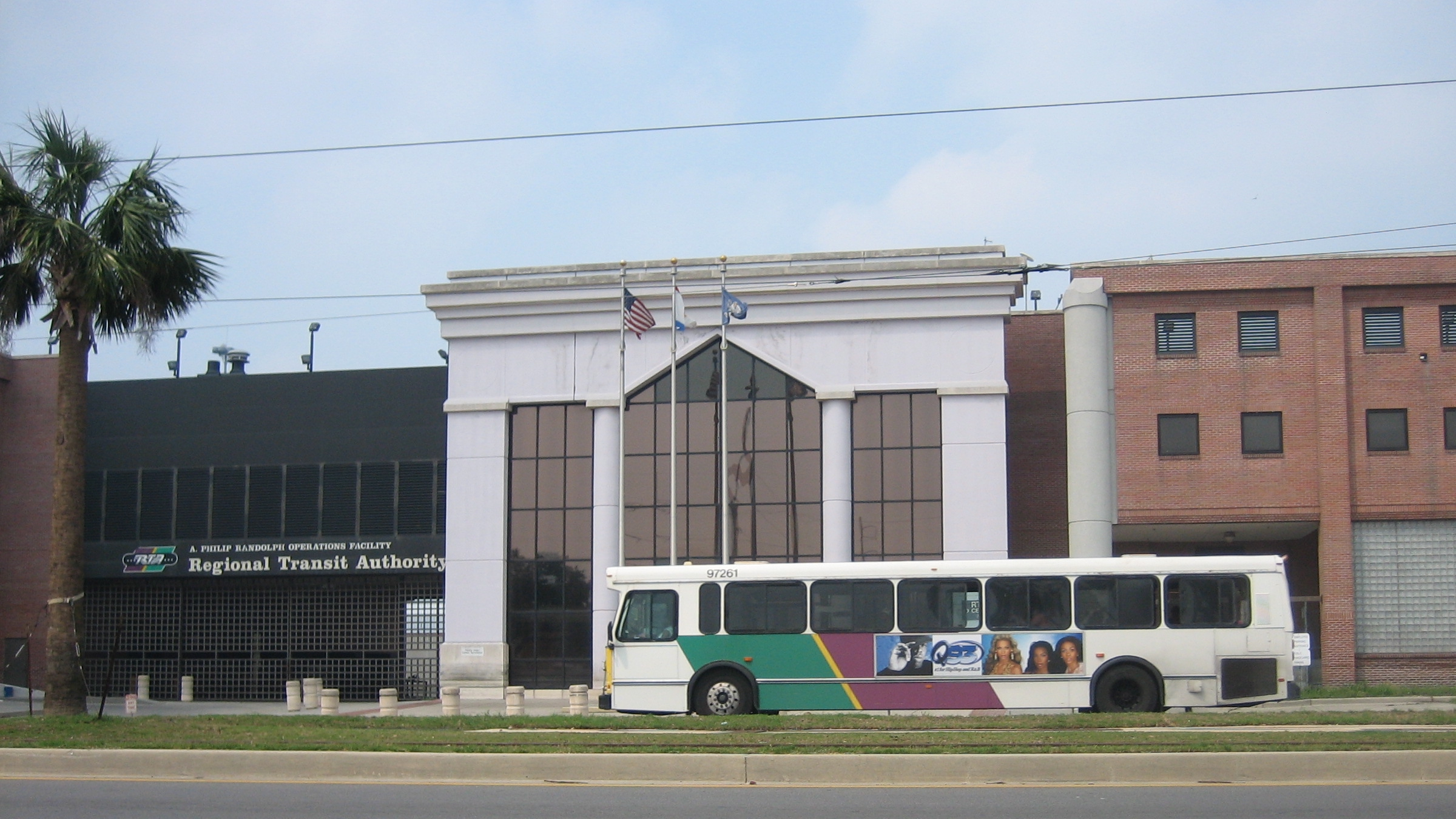
- RTA headquarters on Canal Street
- Founded: 1979
- Headquarters: New Orleans
- Service area: City of New Orleans; Orleans Parish, Louisiana
- Service type: Public transit Heritage streetcar Ferry
- Routes: 28 (bus); 5 (streetcar); 2 (ferry)
- Annual ridership: 13,501,100 (2025)
- Fuel type: Diesel (bus/ferry); Electric (streetcar)
- Chief executive: Lona Edwards Hankins
- Website: norta.com

The New Orleans Regional Transit Authority (RTA or NORTA) is a public transportation agency based in New Orleans. The agency was established by the Louisiana State Legislature in 1979, and has operated bus and historic streetcar service throughout the city since 1983, when it took over the city's mass transit system after nearly six decades' control by New Orleans Public Service, Inc. (now Entergy New Orleans). In 2025, the system had a ridership of 13,501,100, or about 42,400 per weekday as of the second quarter of 2026, making RTA the largest public transit agency in the state of Louisiana.

== History ==
NORTA was established in 1979.

=== Hurricane Katrina ===
NORTA buses were used to transport people to the Superdome before Hurricane Katrina hit. Much of the city flooded due to the storm. The NORTA Administration building on Plaza Drive appears to have been in 10 feet (3.0 m) of water. Almost eighty-five percent of the fleet was rendered useless and inoperative; 146 city buses were visible outdoors in the flood at the 2817 Canal St. facility, while only 22 were at 3900 Desire Pky. The 8201 Willow St. facility was one block within the flood but was built above street level. The buses at the flooded facilities were mostly written off.

All but one of the streetcars built in the 1990s and 2000s were severely damaged in the flooding resulting from the hurricane. The historic Perley Thomas-built streetcars of the St. Charles line were undamaged in the disaster. The damaged streetcars, which had been built by hand on the property by local workers, were repaired in the same facility with components from Brookville Equipment Co.

=== Post-disaster recovery ===
Transit service was restored to areas as they became habitable again. However, there was no 24-hour service on any bus or streetcar line, except for the St. Charles streetcar line. Streetcars were returned to the full length of Canal St. and the Riverfront, initially using the historic St. Charles Line streetcars, which had not been damaged, as had the red Canal cars. In 2008, the St. Charles streetcar resumed running the entire length of its route. By early 2009, the red Canal streetcars were repaired and had taken over service on the Canal and Riverfront Lines.

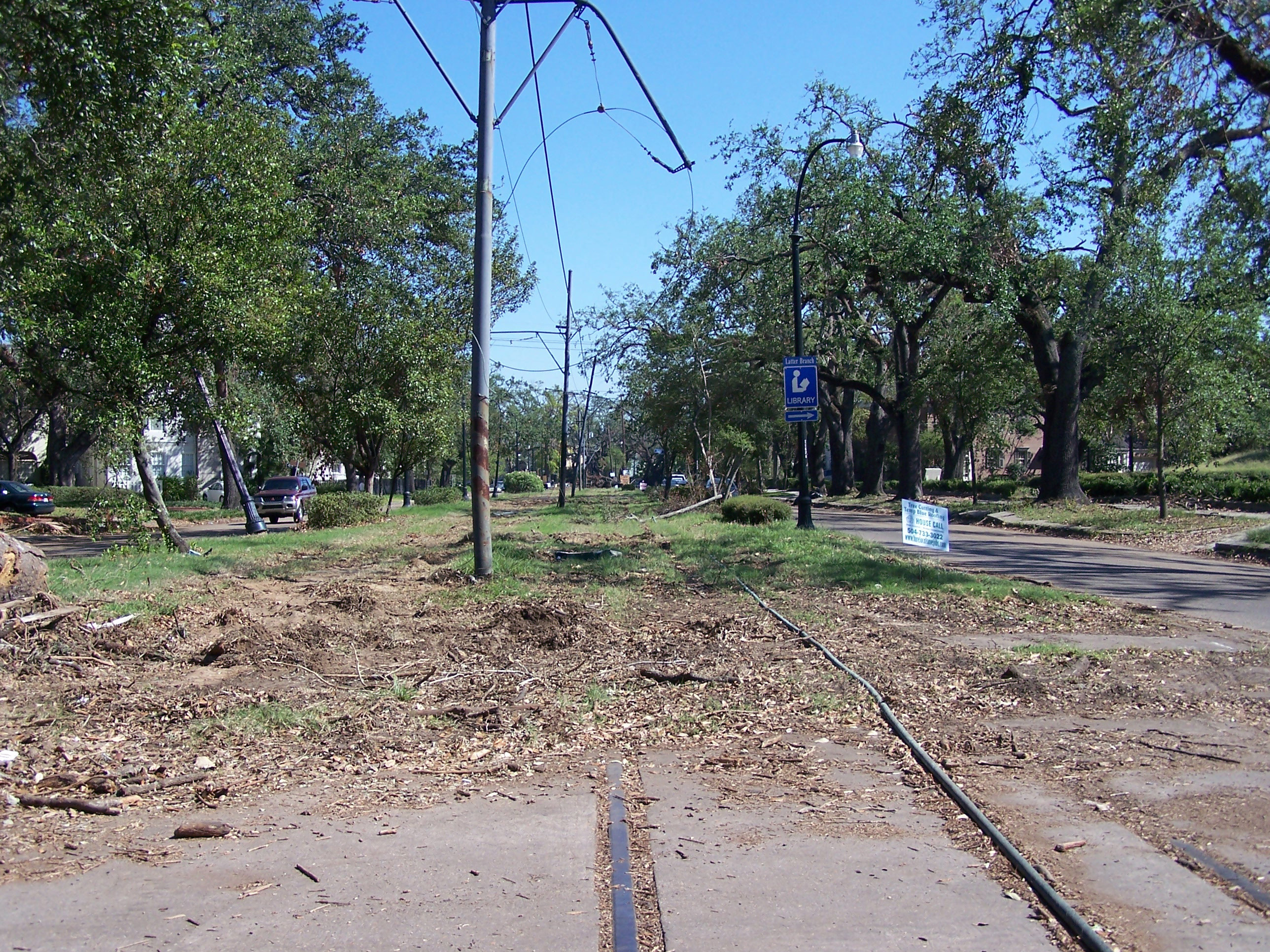
St. Charles Streetcar tracks after Hurricane Katrina

In 2015, transit service was still at 45% of pre-Katrina levels, with buses being at 35% of original service levels while streetcars were fully restored.

Service was changed again on October 2, 2016, with the extension of the Loyola/UPT streetcar line to Elysian Fields Avenue via Rampart Street and adjustment of other streetcar lines and bus routes.

In May 2020, agency operations shifted from private operator Transdev, back to in-house staff.

=== New Links bus routes ===
On September 25, 2022, NORTA launched a bus network redesign. The changes were made after a survey was conducted containing 3,000 people saying that the old lines had been outdated and were not convenient for everyday use. For 4 days after the new routes started, RTA offered free boarding on all buses, streetcars, and the Algiers Point Ferry.

The changes were part of the New Links network, a project designed to upgrade the transit authority to service the people of New Orleans. Upgrades aimed to improve access to jobs and landmarks, reduce wait times, extend service hours, and speed up transfers/connections. No changes were made to the streetcars or ferries.

== Services ==
=== Buses ===
NORTA is the primary bus operator in New Orleans, running 28 routes as of 2025. In 2025, the NORTA bus system had a ridership of 11,250,100.

#	Name	Terminal 1	Terminal 2	Length	via	Notes
3	Tulane - Elmwood	Elmwood; Jefferson Hwy & Spur	Downtown; Elk & Tulane	8.3 mi (13.4 km)	Jefferson Hwy, S Carrollton Ave, Tulane Ave	24-hour service (Except west of Jefferson & Causeway)
8	St Claude - Arabi	Downtown; Main Library	Arabi; St Claude at Parish Line	5.8 mi (9.3 km)	Rampart St (Saint Claude Ave)	24-hour service
9	Broad - Napoleon	Irish Channel; Napoleon & Tchoupitoulas	New Orleans East; New Orleans East Hub	13.4 mi (21.6 km)	Napoleon Ave, Broad St, Chef Menteur Hwy	24-hour service
11	Magazine	West Riverside; Manning Family Children's	Downtown; Canal & Magazine	6.3 mi (10.1 km)	Camp St, Magazine St	
27	Louisiana	St. Thomas Development Neighborhood; Rousseau & St Andrew	Navarre; Orleans & Navarre at Delgado Community College	7.8 mi (12.6 km)	Tchoupitoulas St, Louisiana Ave, Toledano St (Washington Ave)	
31	Leonidas - Gentilly	West Riverside; Children's Hospital New Orleans	Gentilly Woods; Gentilly Woods Hub	12 mi (19 km)	Leonidas St, Carrollton Ave, Gentilly Blvd	
32	Leonidas - Treme	West Riverside; Children's Hospital New Orleans	Downtown; Main Library	10.1 mi (16.3 km)	Leonidas St, Carrollton Ave, Orleans Ave	
45	Lakeview	Navarre; Cemeteries Transit Hub		7.6 mi (12.2 km)	Canal Blvd, Pontchartrain Blvd	Operates in a loop
51	St. Bernard - Claiborne	Fontainebleau; S Claiborne & Carollton	St. Bernard; St. Bernard & Senate	7.7 mi (12.4 km)	Claiborne Ave, St Bernard Ave	Evening/overnight service on Claiborne Ave provided by 53-O
52	Paris - Broadmoor	Dixon; Washington & S. Carrollton at Xavier University	Lake Terrace/Lake Oaks; LSU New Orleans	10.2 mi (16.4 km)	Paris Ave, Washington Ave	Evening/overnight service on Paris Ave provided by 53-O
53-O	Paris-Claiborne OWL	Fontainebleau; S Claiborne & Carrollton	Lake Terrace/Lake Oaks; LSU New Orleans	10.6 mi (17.1 km)	Claiborne Ave, Paris Ave	Runs evening/overnight service on portions of Routes 51 and 52
55	Elysian Fields	Downtown; Main Library	Gentilly Woods; Gentilly Woods Hub	10.9 mi (17.5 km)	Elysian Fields Ave, Press Dr, Congress Dr	24-hour service (Except east of LSU New Orleans)
57	Franklin - Freret	Audubon; Audubon Zoo	Pontchartrain Park; Press & Emmett Bashful at SUNO	12.1 mi (19.5 km)	Broadway St, Freret St, N Claiborne Ave, Franklin Ave	
61	Lake Forest - Village De L'Est	Downtown; Main Library	Village De L'Est; Chef Menteur & Michoud	20.5 mi (33.0 km)	I-10, Dwyer Rd, Lake Forest Blvd, Chef Menteur Hwy	24-hour service
62	Morrison - Bullard	Downtown; Main Library	New Orleans East; New Orleans East Hub	14.3 mi (23.0 km)	I-10, Morrison Rd, Bullard Rd	Overnight service provided by 62-O
62-O	Morrison OWL	Downtown; Main Library	New Orleans East; New Orleans East Hub	19.2 mi (30.9 km)	I-10, Morrison Rd, Bullard Rd	Runs overnight service on portions of Routes 62 and 68
66	Hayne Loop	New Orleans East; New Orleans East Hub	New Orleans East; New Orleans East Hub	16.8 mi (27.0 km)	Leon C. Simon Dr, Hayne Blvd	Operates in a loop
67	Michoud Loop	New Orleans East; New Orleans East Hub	New Orleans East; New Orleans East Hub	16.3 mi (26.2 km)	Lake Forest Blvd, Bullard Rd, Old Gentilly Rd, Michoud Blvd	Operates in a loop
68	Little Woods Loop	New Orleans East; New Orleans East Hub	New Orleans East; New Orleans East Hub	10.1 mi (16.3 km)	Hayne Blvd, I-10 Service Rd	Operates in a loop; Overnight service provided by 62-O
80	Desire - Louisa	Marigny; Elysian Fields & Decatur	Gentilly Woods; Gentilly Woods Hub	5.3 mi (8.5 km)	Desire St, Louisa St	
84	Galvez - Lower 9th	Downtown; Main Library	Arabi; St Claude at Parish Line	8.1 mi (13.0 km)	N Galvez St, N Miro St	
86	St. Maurice - Chalmette	Arabi; St Claude at Jackson Barracks	Chalmette; Nunez Community College	13.8 mi (22.2 km)	Tupelo St, Judge Perez Dr, Paris Rd, Fats Domino Ave	Operates in a loop
91	Jackson - Esplanade	St. Thomas Development Neighborhood; Rousseau & St. Andrew	Navarre; Cemeteries Transit Hub	7.6 mi (12.2 km)	Jackson Ave, Esplanade Ave	
103	General Meyer Local	Downtown; Tulane & Loyola	New Aurora; General Meyer & Carver	14.6 mi (23.5 km)	Pontchartrain Expy, L.B. Landry Ave, General Meyer Ave	
105	Algiers Local	Gretna; Wilty Terminal	Tall Timbers-Brechtel; Tullis & Woodland	9.1 mi (14.6 km)	Pace Blvd, Holiday Dr, Tullis Dr	
114A	Garden Oaks - Sullen	Downtown; Tulane & Loyola	New Aurora; General Meyer & Carver	12.9 mi (20.8 km)	Pontchartrain Expy, General DeGaulle Dr, Sullen Dr	24-hour service
114B	Garden Oaks - Woodland	Downtown; Tulane & Loyola	Tall Timbers-Brechtel; Tullis & Woodland	12 mi (19 km)	Pontchartrain Expy, MacArthur Blvd, Woodland Dr	
202	Airport Express	Kenner; Louis Armstrong International Airport	Downtown; Canal St. Ferry Terminal	15.3 mi (24.6 km)	I-10	

=== Streetcar ===
New Orleans currently has five operating streetcar lines travelling over 15.9 miles (25.6 km) of tracks. In 2025, the streetcar system had a ridership of 3,136,500.

#	Name	Terminal 1	Terminal 2	Length	Notes
12	St. Charles	Carrolton Ave & S. Claiborne Ave	Canal St & Carondelet St	6.6 mi (10.6 km)	24-hour service
46	Rampart/Loyola	Elysian Fields Ave	New Orleans Union Passenger Terminal	2.2 mi (3.5 km)	
47	Canal/Cemeteries	Cemeteries Transit Terminal	Canal St. Ferry Terminal	3.6 mi (5.8 km)	24-hour service
48	Canal/City Park	Museum of Art	Canal St. Ferry Terminal	3.6 mi (5.8 km)	
49	Riverfront	French Market	Julia Street	1.3 mi (2.1 km)	

=== Ferries ===
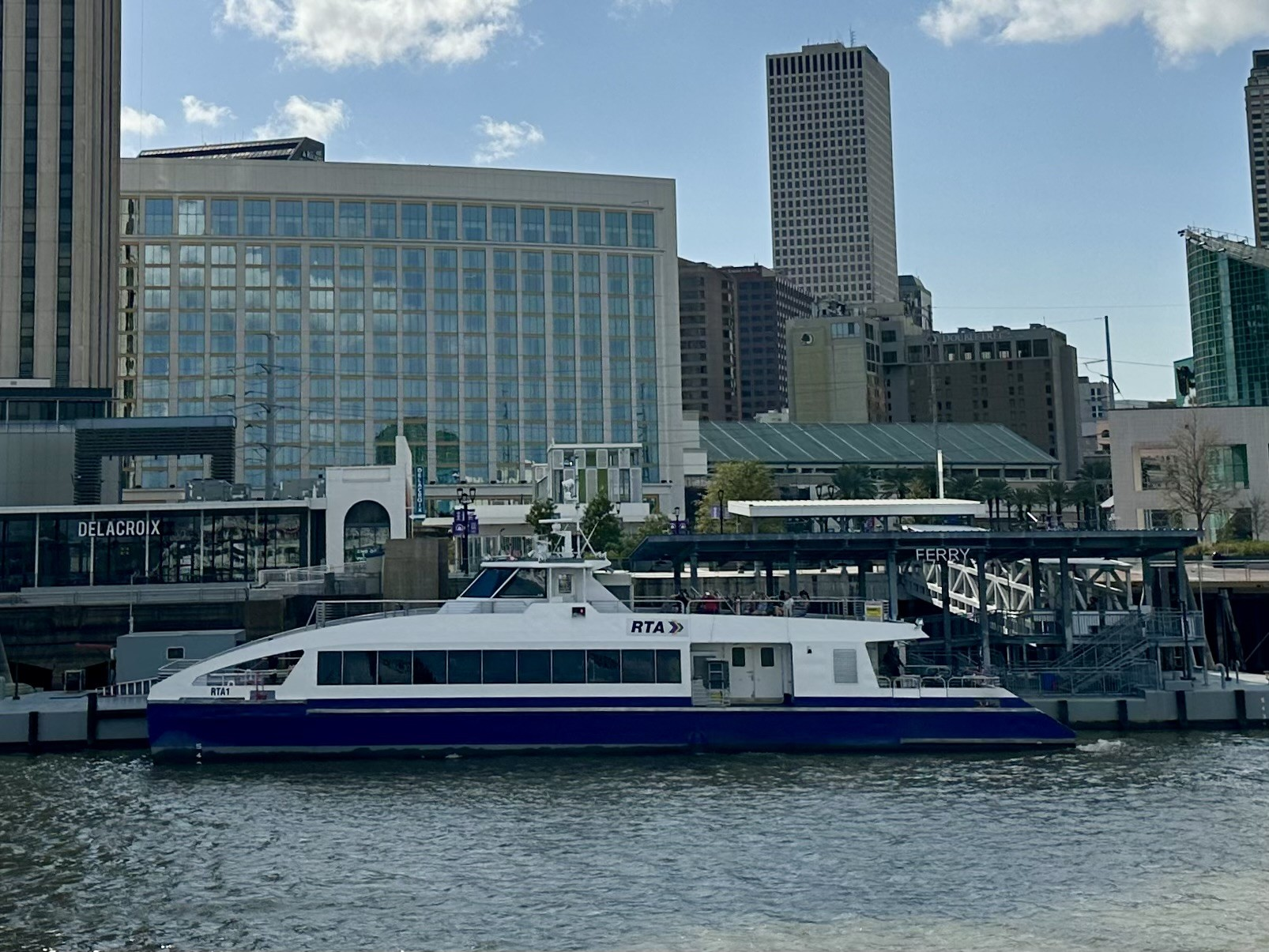
Algiers Point–Canal Street Ferry "RTA1" at the Canal Street terminal

New Orleans currently has two operating ferry routes, both crossing the Mississippi River.

#	Name	Terminal 1	Terminal 2	Length	Notes
1	Algiers Point Ferry	Canal St. Ferry Terminal	Algiers Ferry Terminal	0.43 mi (0.69 km)	Pedestrian Only
4	Chalmette Ferry	Lower Algiers Ferry	Chalmette Ferry	0.45 mi (0.72 km)	Vehicles & Pedestrians

== Fares ==
Basic rates for all modes, except ferries, are $1.25 per boarding (or $0.40 for 65 and up, disabled and Medicare, $0.50 for 5–17). 24-hour Jazzy Passes are $3, or $1 for youth and $0.80 for seniors, good for all modes including ferries. There are free transfer cards, good for next 120 minutes of unlimited use (round-trips/stopovers prohibited).

On July 18, 2022, the authority released Le Pass, a new trip planner and ticket app. It includes tickets and tracking for both RTA and Jefferson Transit buses. On August 29, 2022, RTA shut down ticket buying on the old RTA GoMobile app. Le Pass updated from the old routes on September 25, 2022.

== Governance ==
The RTA Board of Commissioners is in charge of making major decisions for the authority. The board consists of appointees by the Mayor of New Orleans and the President of Jefferson Parish. Its overall authority for transit in New Orleans includes setting fares, overseeing service and operations, developing operating budgets, approving each year's annual transportation development plan, and deciding upon capital purchases and expansions.

Under contract to the RTA Board of Commissioners, Transdev formerly managed all day-to-day aspects of the transit agency on behalf of the RTA Board. Transdev handled operations and service, safety issues, vehicle maintenance, customer care, route design and scheduling, human resources, administration, ridership growth, capital planning, grant administration, communications, purchasing, and other agency functions. Transdev was under contract to and reported to the RTA Board of Commissioners. The company operates public transportation for some 5,000 transit authorities around the world. Transdev (then Veolia Transport) was hired in 2008.

As of December 20, 2020, Transdev no longer manages the RTA. All bus, streetcar, and paratransit operators, and also maintenance personnel, are now employees of RTA. Ferry services continue to be operated for RTA by LabMar Ferry Services.

== See also ==
- Streetcars in New Orleans
- List of light-rail transit systems
