= Louisiana Department of Transportation and Development =

Government agency in Louisiana, United States

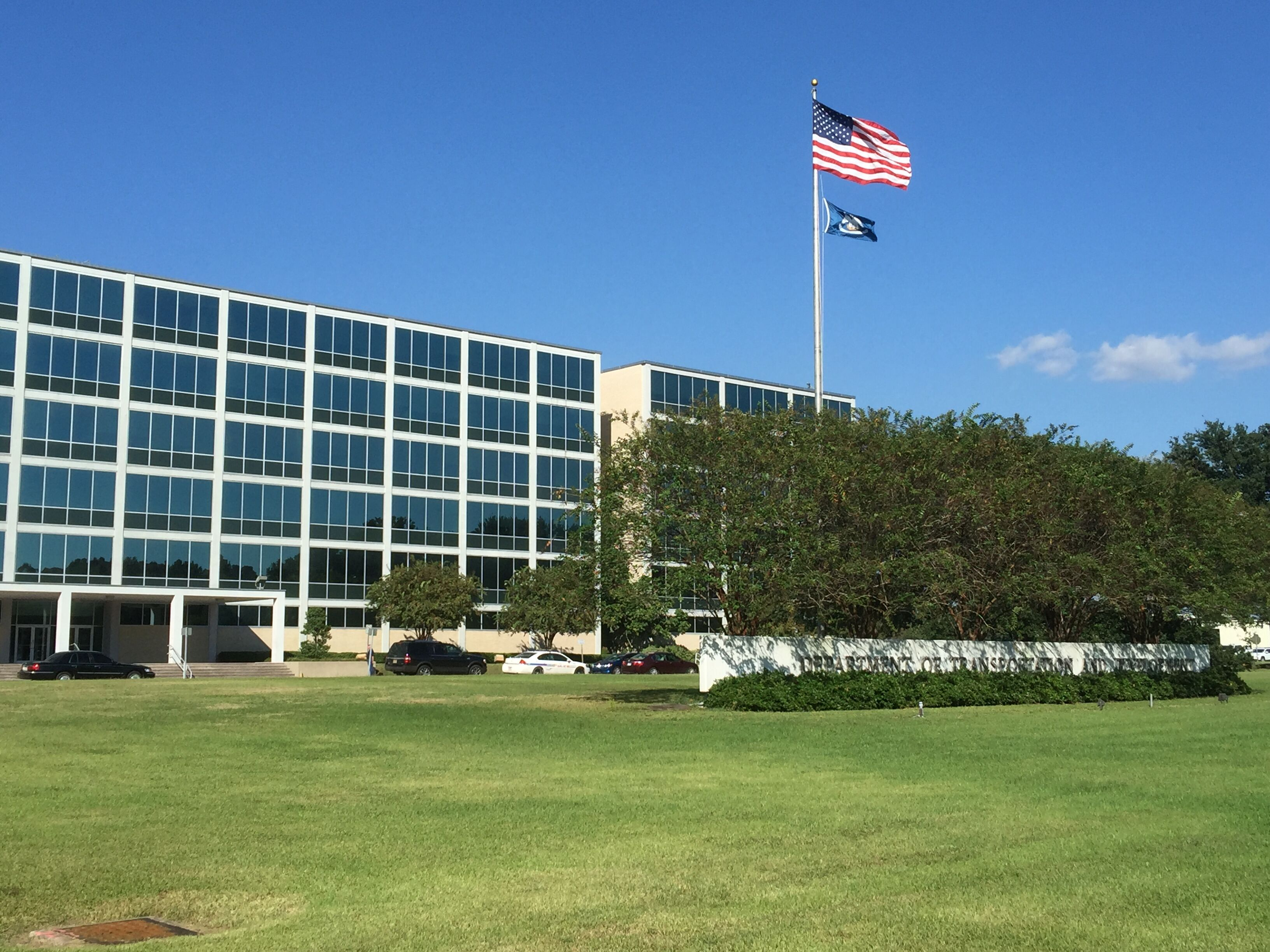
- Louisiana DOTD Headquarters in 2016

Agency overview
- Preceding agencies: Louisiana Department of Highways; Louisiana Department of Public Works
- Jurisdiction: Louisiana
- Headquarters: 1201 Capitol Access Road, Baton Rouge, Louisiana
- Agency executive: Joe Donahue, Secretary
- Website: dotd.la.gov

The Louisiana Department of Transportation and Development (DOTD) is a state government organization in the United States, in charge of maintaining public transportation, roadways, bridges, canals, select levees, floodplain management, port facilities, commercial vehicles, and aviation which includes 69 airports, in the U.S. state of Louisiana. The agency has approximately five thousand personnel on staff and an operating budget of $2.3 billion. DOTD operations are run through nine district offices across the state.

The current DOTD Secretary is Joe Donahue, appointed in January 2024 by Governor Jeff Landry. Other functions of the DOTD are Dams (Dam Safety Program), flood control (Floodplain Management, water resource management (wells), and maintaining state-run ferries and moveable bridge status. The Louisiana Transportation Authority (LTA) is also under the DOTD, as well as the DOTD port construction and development.

== History ==
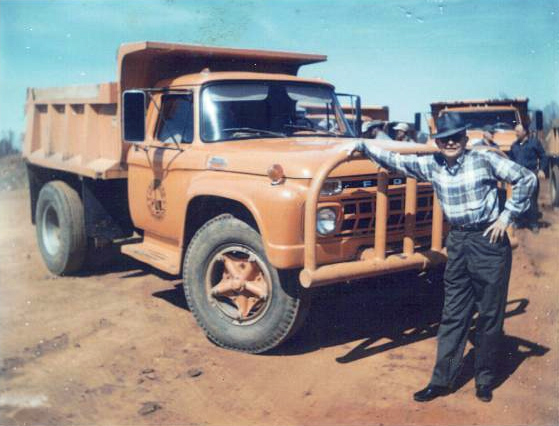
A Louisiana Highway Department gravel truck driver pauses in front of his orange-colored vehicle (1972).

The new Louisiana Constitution of 1976 (adopted in 1974) and Act 83 of 1977 abolished the Departments of Highways and Public Works and restructured them into the Department of Transportation and Development (DOTD), thereby encompassing related activities such as highways, public works, aviation, public transportation, and a number of transportation authorities, committees, boards, and commissions. This form of organization continued until 1988 when Act 488 placed all agency functions under one of three offices: the Office of the Secretary, the Office of Engineering, and the Office of Management and Finance.

Act 71 of 1998 reorganized DOTD into its present functional arrangement of the Office of the Secretary and five other offices.

== DOTD district offices ==
The DOTD has 9 district offices across the state. Each office is run by a district engineer administrator.

District	Area (Parishes)	Headquarters
02	Jefferson, Lafourche, Orleans, Plaquemines, St. Bernard, St. Charles, Terrebonne	Bridge City
03	Acadia, Evangeline, Iberia, Lafayette, St. Landry, St. Martin, St. Mary, Vermillion	Lafayette
04	Bienville, Bossier, Caddo, Claiborne, De Soto, Red River, Webster	Bossier City
05	East Carroll, Jackson, Lincoln, Morehouse, Madison, Ouachita, Richland, West Carroll, Union	Monroe
07	Allen, Beauregard, Cameron, Calcasieu, Jefferson Davis	Lake Charles
08	Avoyelles, Grant, Natchitoches, Rapides, Sabine, Vernon, Winn	Alexandria
58	Caldwell, Catahoula, Concordia, Franklin, La Salle, Tensas	Winnsboro
61	Ascension, Assumption, East Baton Rouge, East Feliciana, Iberville, Pointe Coupee, St. James, West Baton Rouge, West Feliciana	Baton Rouge
62	Livingston, St. Helena, St. John the Baptist, St. Tammany, Tangipahoa, Washington	Hammond

== Public transportation ==
The DOTD is in charge of Public Transportation and provides funding to participating parishes through federal transit grant programs.

== Roadways ==
DOTD has the responsibility of maintaining state highways and interstate highways under state jurisdiction. This includes the maintenance and updating of existing highways as well as planning, design, and building of new highways. DOTD is also in charge of the bridge management system for planning and design, planning, building, inspection, maintenance, and even replacement of bridges in Louisiana.

The Transportation Infrastructure Model for Economic Development or TIMED Program is an ongoing $5 billion program, including funding to widen over 500 miles (800 km) of Louisiana state highways from two lanes to four. "TIMED" is also over construction or modifying several bridges including the John James Audubon Bridge, Huey P. Long Bridge and Florida Avenue Bridge.

DOTD operates traffic cameras in eight cities along Interstate 10 and Interstate 12 and in Shreveport as intelligent transportation systems (ITS).

=== Hurricane evacuation ===
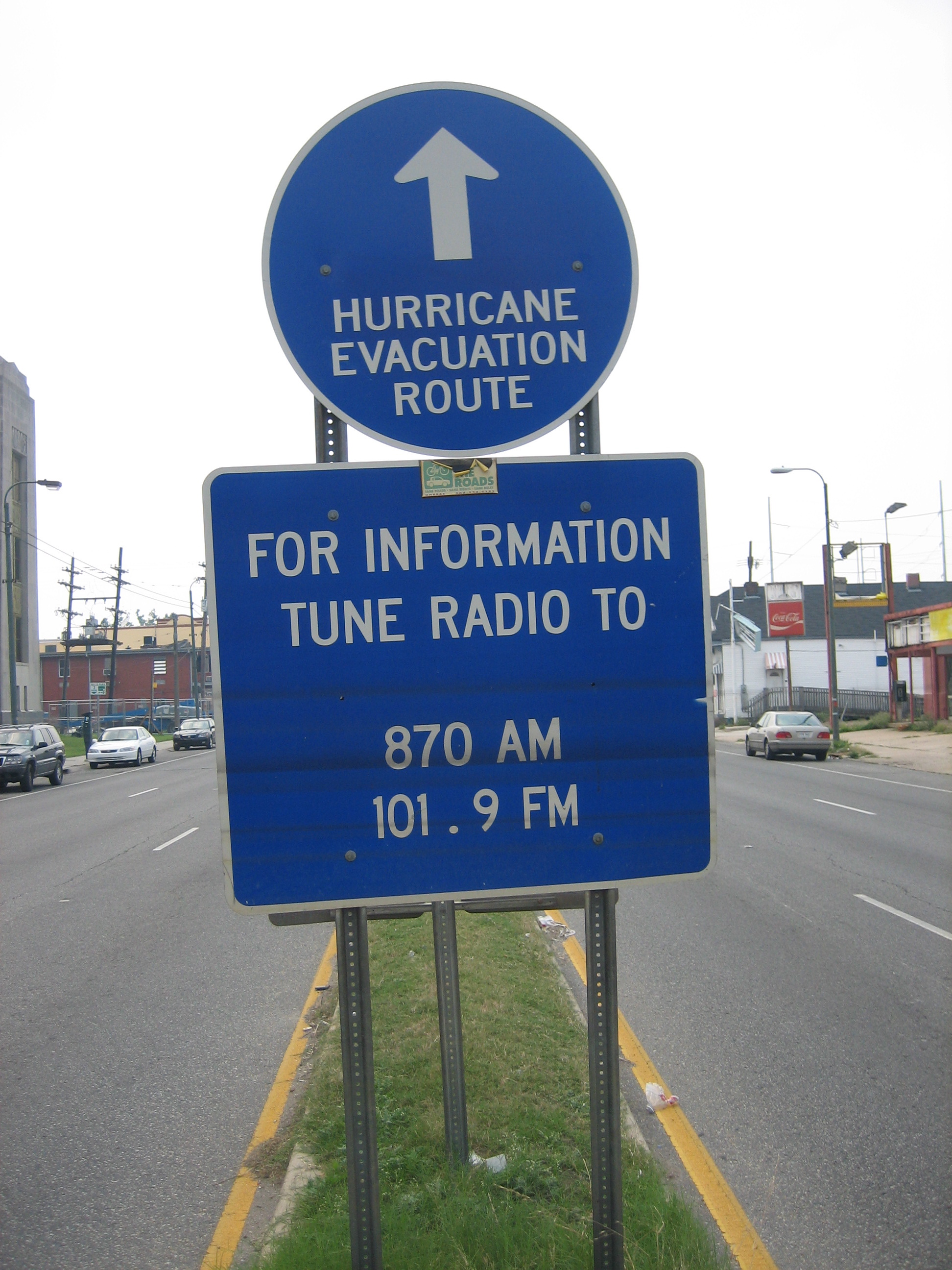
A hurricane evacuation route shield in New Orleans, Louisiana, after Hurricane Katrina

The DOTD has been active in addressing the increased awareness for effective evacuation plans in the event of hurricanes threatening southeast Louisiana, and the Greater New Orleans area in particular. Following lessons learned during Hurricane Georges in 1998 DOTD has constructed contraflow lanes, crossover lanes, and made agreements with Mississippi officials to implement the contraflow plan in the event of future hurricane threats. This is a plan where all the traffic is directed in the same direction and marked with appropriate signs and signals. These plans were tested and modified following Hurricane Ivan in 2004 as residents of the New Orleans area spent upwards of 18 hours in traffic. These changes included the strategic distribution of traffic control devices, improved coordination of police personnel, and wide distribution of information and maps to the public depicting the state's phased evacuation plan and the various contraflow routes. These changes were tested and successful in August 2005 when New Orleans and the surrounding parishes were placed under a mandatory evacuation in advance of Hurricane Katrina.

=== Roadside vegetation ===
The DOTD has a department for roadside vegetation granted by Act No. 682 of the Regular Session of the State Legislature of 1989. There is a DOTD Chief Architect and a DOTD Chief Engineer and each district has a district roadside development coordinator. Mowing of interstate and Louisiana highways are under the jurisdiction of Roadside Development and all road construction and improvements are subject to inspection and approval.

The department adopted a manual that sets guidelines and rules for landscaping, wildflowers, mowing, and spraying herbicides and pesticides. The state has an aggressive stance on the preservation and planting of wildflowers. The guidelines state that mowing should be a minimum of three times a year on interstate highways and biannually on state highways. The Environmental Protection Agency (EPA) designated the Louisiana Department of Agriculture to enforce compliance of applicators of herbicides or pesticides with training provided by the Louisiana Extension program. The District Roadside Development Coordinator must be licensed by the state and be proficient in all aspects of pesticides and herbicides.

== Ports and port facilities ==
The DOTD is the authority over ports and port facilities in Louisiana.

- Louisiana Offshore Oil Port (LOOP) – the largest deepwater port in the United States, allowing oil supertankers to offload their cargo. Located 18 miles (29 km) offshore of Port Fourchon, Louisiana, 10% of imported crude oil is offloaded at LOOP.
- Some projects funded by TIMED are already complete, including projects that made improvements at the Port of New Orleans

=== Canals, levees, and dams ===
DOTD operates and maintains the dam, water control structures, gates, spillway, and related appurtenances on 20 state-constructed reservoirs and is required to inspect all dams to ensure conformity with established standards and regulations. The department works closely with the United States Army Corps of Engineers.

=== Floodplain Management ===
DOTD is the State Agency for the National Flood Insurance Program (NFIP). The state works in conjunction with FEMA on a 25%/75% ratio.

== Aviation ==
The DOTD is responsible for monitoring 62 airports in the state. A completed TIMED project of the DOTD is the Louis Armstrong New Orleans International Airport.

== Commercial vehicles ==
All commercial vehicles in the State of Louisiana are governed by the Dept of Public Safety.

=== Weights and standards ===
The DOTD division of "Weights and Standards" is the office responsible for vehicle oversize permits on Louisiana highways. DOTD considers there are twelve stationary scale house locations in the state but for most "Point of entry" (POE) locations and divided highways there is a scale house on each side of the road. When the scalehouse is open all trucks not equipped with "Prepass" or "Drivewyze" must enter the scale house if directed. Exceptions are scales that have weigh in motion scales. Dept of Public Safety enforcement officers (DPS) have portable scales and can weigh a vehicle anywhere it is safe.

== Facilities ==
- Louisiana Transportation Research Center – a joint operation with Louisiana State University to provide research and education for transportation issues.

== PERBA ==
The DOTD also maintains the Permits Electronic Routing Bridge Analysis (PERBA) that includes a "Trouble Board" of restricted roads throughout the state.

== See also ==
- Crescent City Connection Division
