= Sankofa (disambiguation) =

Sankofa is an Adinkra concept of "roots", symbolized by a bird with its head turned backwards

Sankofa may also refer to:

- Sankofa (film), 1993
- Sankofa (novel), 2021
- Sankofa Film and Video Collective
- Sankofa (album), 2025
- Sankofa Television, a subsidiary of African Communications Foundation, based in Amsterdam, the Netherlands
- "Sankofa", a song from the album Blue Light 'til Dawn by Cassandra Wilson
- Sankofa (oogenus), an oogenus of bird-like eggs of a dinosaur species
- Sankofa Square, formerly Yonge-Dundas Square, Toronto, Canada
- Sankofa Wetland Park and Nature Trail, park in New Orleans, Louisiana
- Sankofa Community Development Corporation, community organization in New Orleans, Louisiana

People:

- Mika'il Sankofa, U.S. sabre fencer and coach
- Norman Sankofa, a fictional character on the British television soap opera Hollyoaks
- Osei Sankofa, an English footballer
- Shaka Sankofa, a Texas death-row inmate sentenced in 1981
- Theo Sankofa, a fictional character on the long British television soap opera Hollyoaks
