= Rene Beauregard House =

House in St. Bernard Parish, Louisiana, US

Coordinates: 29°56′26″N 89°59′39″W

The Malus-Beauregard House, previously known as the Rene Beauregard house, is a home built in 1832-1833 and significantly altered in 1850's to a Greek Revival style overlooking the Battle of New Orleans battlefield. Located in St. Bernard Parish about 6 miles east of the City of New Orleans and adjoining the field of Chalmette where the Battle of New Orleans was fought in 1815. The house is named after its first and last owners and served as a country residence for several wealthy families during the 19th century. Its latest use was the Visitor Center for the Chalmette Battlefield but has been closed since Hurricane Katrina due to its poor condition. It is not considered of historical importance due to it being located on the famous battlefield but unrelated and built after the event. No restoration efforts are planned.

== History ==
In 1817, two years after the death of Lino de Chalmet, the 22-arpent Chalmette property was sold to brothers Hilaire and Louis St. Amand, wealthy free men of color. Under the St. Amands's proprietorship, the property was returned to sugarcane plantation, and the brothers established the production facilities and servants quarters (the St. Amands were slaveowners) necessary to maintain such an enterprise. The entire acreage remained intact until 1832, when the brothers subdivided the property into several smaller tracts in order to pay off debts. The property was divided into upper six and lower four arpents. The upper six were sold to Alexandre Baron as seen on Charles F. Zimpel's map of 1834. There is nothing to indicate that there was a house on the property at the time of purchase. On the side facing the river, the property measured one arpent (196 feet) wide and 17 arpents deep, or approximately 15 acres. Around 1833, he (Baron) had a residence constructed on the property in the French Creole style for his mother-in-law, Madeleine Pannetier (widow of Guillaume Malus). After Baron's main residence in the French Quarter was seized, he and his wife agreed to move in with widow Malus due to Baron's frequent absence working as a mariner and merchant sailing between New Orleans and several cities in Mexico. Widow Malus lived in the house until her death 16 September 1835. The house then became property of Widow Malus' children François and Marie Anne Malus (widow of Alexandre Baron). In 1848, Madame Baron donated her interest in the property to Lucien Malus (François' son) and in 1856, the place was sold to Caroline Fabre, widow of Michel Bernard Cantrelle.

The house and property served as a country retreat for a succession of private owners: the Malus and Baron families; Caroline Fabre, widow of Michel Bernard Cantrelle, who, in the 1860s, modified the house in the Greek Revival style; the Spaniard Jose Antonio Fernadez y Lineros, who named the property “Bueno Retiro”; and Rene Toutant Beauregard, eldest son of Confederate General P. G. T. Beauregard. In 1904, the property was sold to the New Orleans Terminal Company by Beauregard. Early documents of sale indicate that the house had “a splendid orchard, containing every variety of rare fruit trees and vegetables, a beautiful flower garden, containing the choicest plants to be found.”

In the latter deed the property is mentioned as "Bueno Retiro" from Mrs. Alice Cenas Beauregard recites the derivation of her title by her from Octave Toca, September 24, 1888, and deed from Rene Toutant Beauregard recites derivation by him from Mrs. Carmen Fernandez, June 4, 1880. Mr. Fitswilson continues: We have been told the property is the Old Beauregard House, built by Gallier, Architect, for Marquis de Trava, and was called "Bueno Retiro" was purchased later by Judge Rene Beauregard, son of General G, T. Beauregard." Next tract is the United States Soldiers Cemetery. Next, Ictienne Villavaso property. The succeeding properties became the home of Rene Beauregard, son of General G. T. Beauregard, after having been in possession

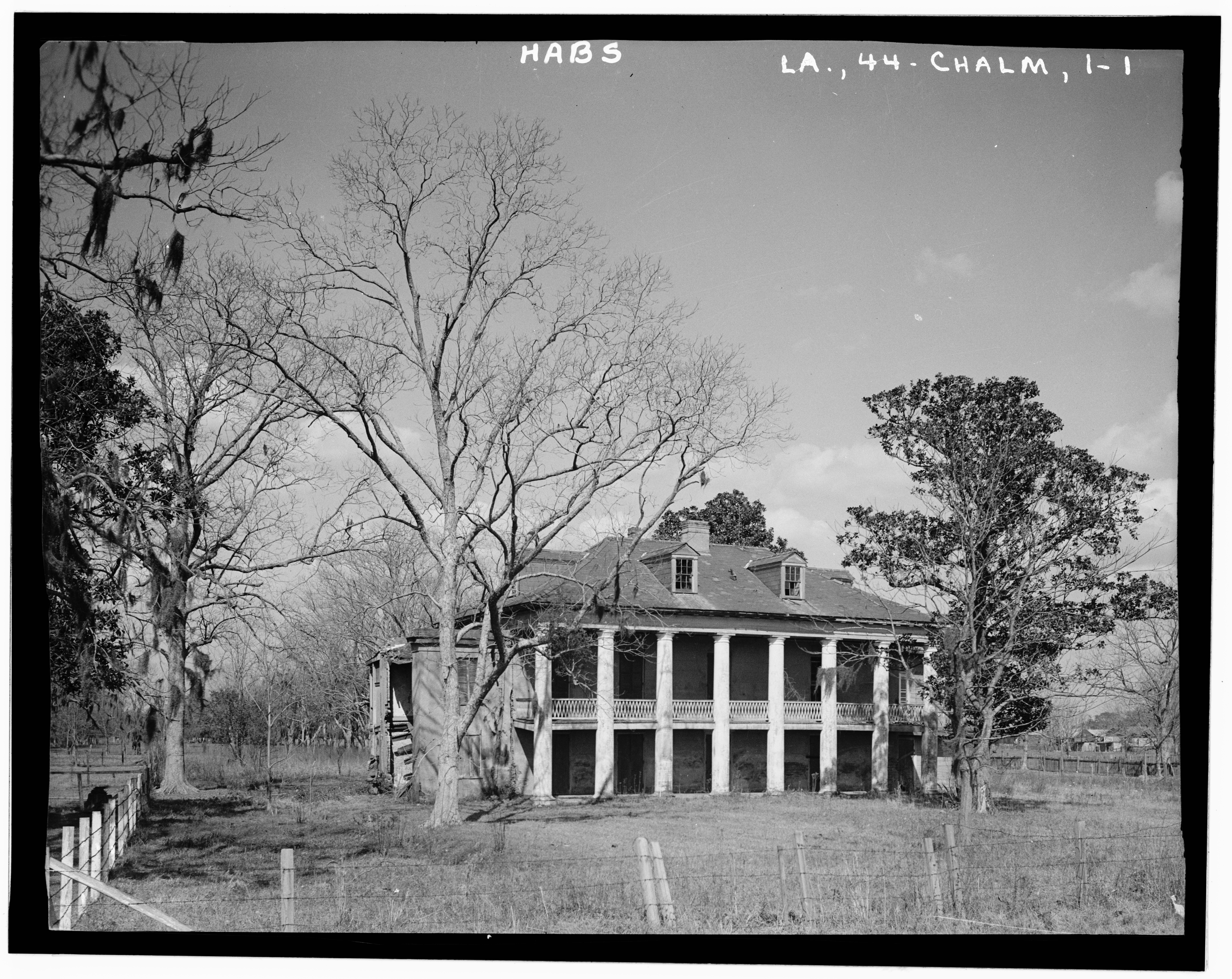

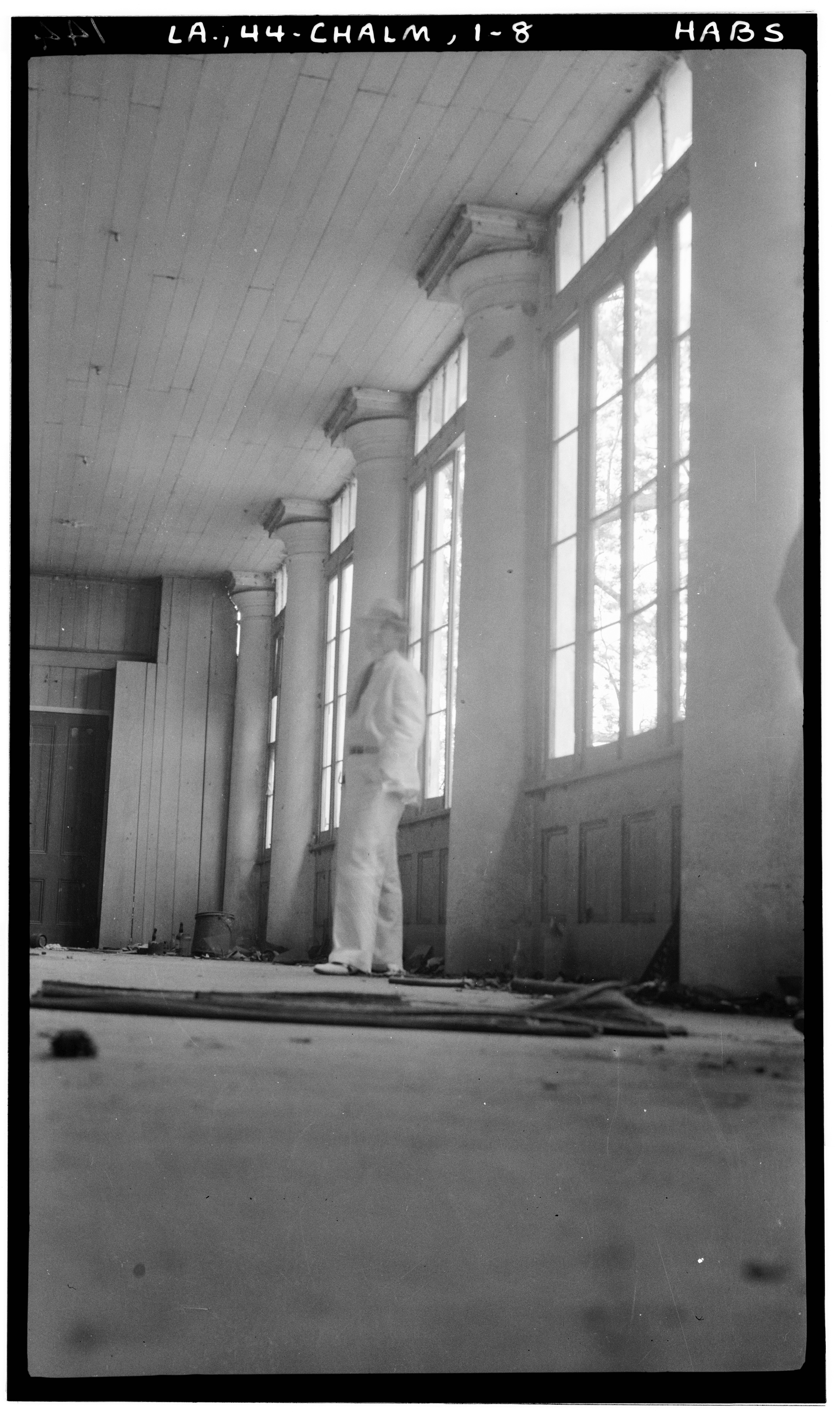

Nothing remains of the original buildings that stood on Chalmette's plantation in 1815, nor of the structures built subsequently by various private owners. Only the Malus Beauregard House has survived.

== House construction and style ==
The house represents a rather late development of the Louisiana plantation type. There is a colonnade of eight columns across both front and back of the house, the main body of which is only one room deep. The plan is extremely simple, there being four rooms to each floor. There are additional twelve-foot-deep galleries on the north and west elevations.

At the time it was built, the house was probably a simple French-Louisiana type farm house, as modified then by newer American influences. The walls were of brick, painted red and "pencilled," that is, the mortar joints were painted with a white stripe, a common practice of the 1830s. It retains the original design of a rectangular building one room deep, each room opening to galleries on the north and south sides and connected by doorways between rooms rather than by an interior hallway, a plan well suited to the southern Louisiana climate. The house and two-story galleries are covered by a broad hipped roof providing shade and covered outdoor living spaces. The original porch supports, possibly brick posts on the first level and typical French Colonial wood colonettes above, were replaced in the 1850s remodeling with large Tuscan columns extending the full two-story height. The roof is covered with slate. Gable dormers are on all four roof faces, and a brick chimney rises near the center of the roof. The exterior is stuccoed, the walls scored to simulate stone. Interior walls are plastered and have replacement Greek Revival style trim. In 1856, Caroline Fabre Cantrelle, widow of Michel Bernard Cantrelle, purchased the house and remodeled it in the Greek Revival style. She added the colonnade of eight columns across each long elevation, and installed Greek Revival mantels and trim throughout. The interior floor plan was altered by subdividing the east room on both levels to create an interior stairhall between first and second floors. Speculation that the roof slope and dormers were changed to accommodate the new exterior cornice has not been verified and warrants careful investigation. [Jose Antonio] Fernandez [y Lineros, also known as Marquis de Trava] added a two-story brick wing on the west side with an exterior stair behind, stuccoed the exterior of the house and wing, and enclosed the north gallery with tall casement windows above raised wood panels. He may have made other changes later obliterated. Fernandez advertised the house for sale in 1874 as a “mansion containing all the modern improvements,” an orchard and several outbuildings.

The rooms at the northwest end are in a small wing, which was added at a later date than the original building, and which collapsed in 1937.

There is also a wing at the southeast end, apparently of the period of about 1890 and of a very bad design, detracting considerably from the appearance of the house which is otherwise good.

The walls of the house and the columns are of brick plastered and painted, the columns being white and the main body of the house a sort of apricot color with green blinds and white trim. The roof of the house which extends out over the colonnade is quite unique, being a hipped red-purple slate roof with a very graceful low triple pitch. There are two dormers front and rear and one at each end, placed rather high in the roof. The detail is poor throughout the house.

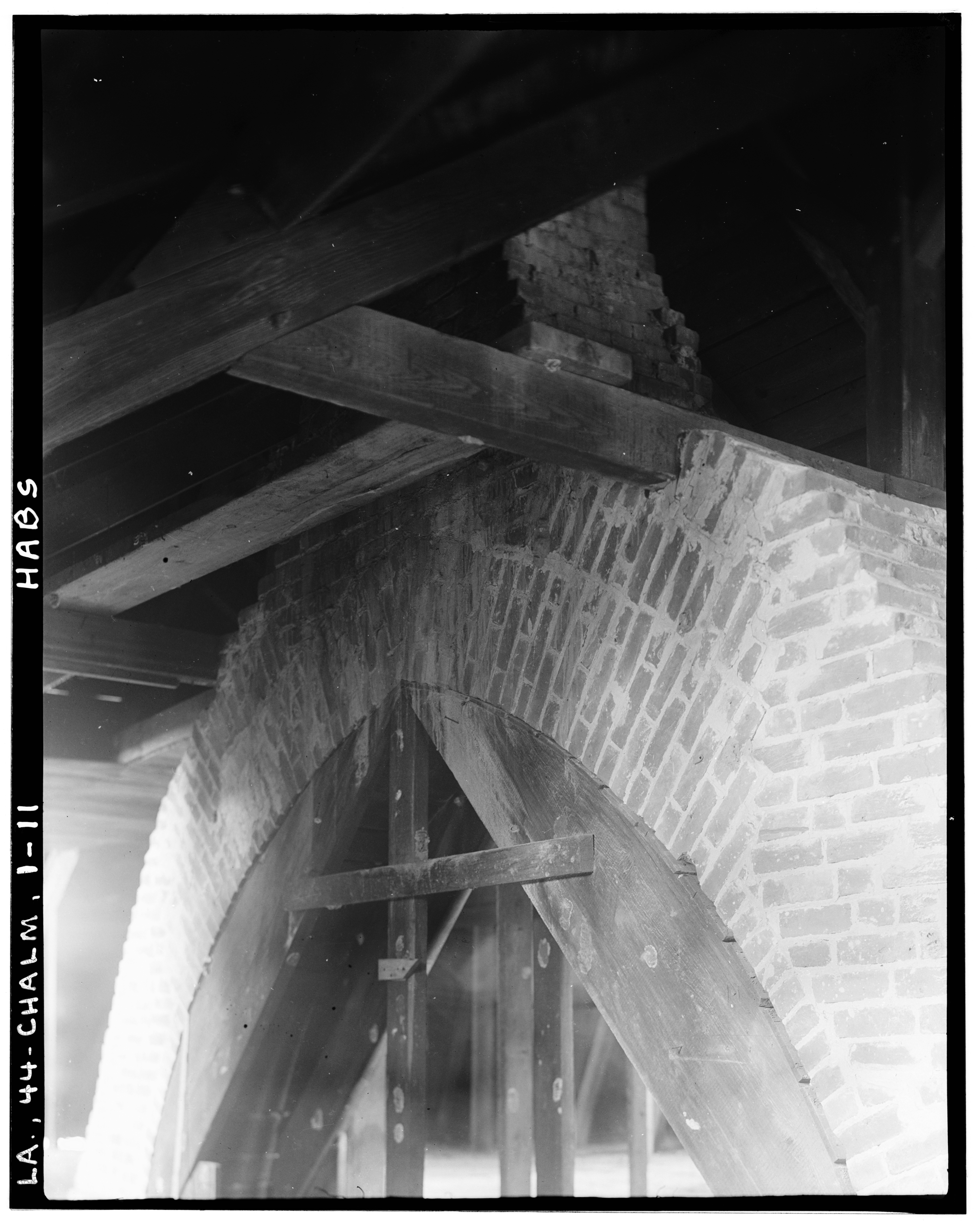
Unique Chimney

Perhaps the most interesting detail of construction is the chimney. There are in reality two chimneys which by means of an arch in the attic are joined and come out of the roof just below the ridge as one.

"The property, upon which what is known as the Rene Beauregard House is located, was conveyed to New Orleans Terminal Company in 1904 in two parcels."

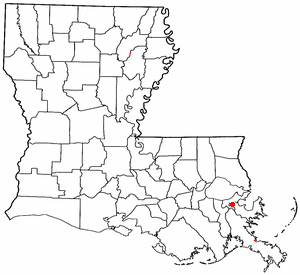
Map of Chalmette, Louisiana

== Reported condition as of 1937 ==
Poor. North wing has collapsed. Wings at each end of house are additions, Entire first floor has rotted out, Walls, roof and columns of main house are still in good condition. Number of Stories Two stories with attic.

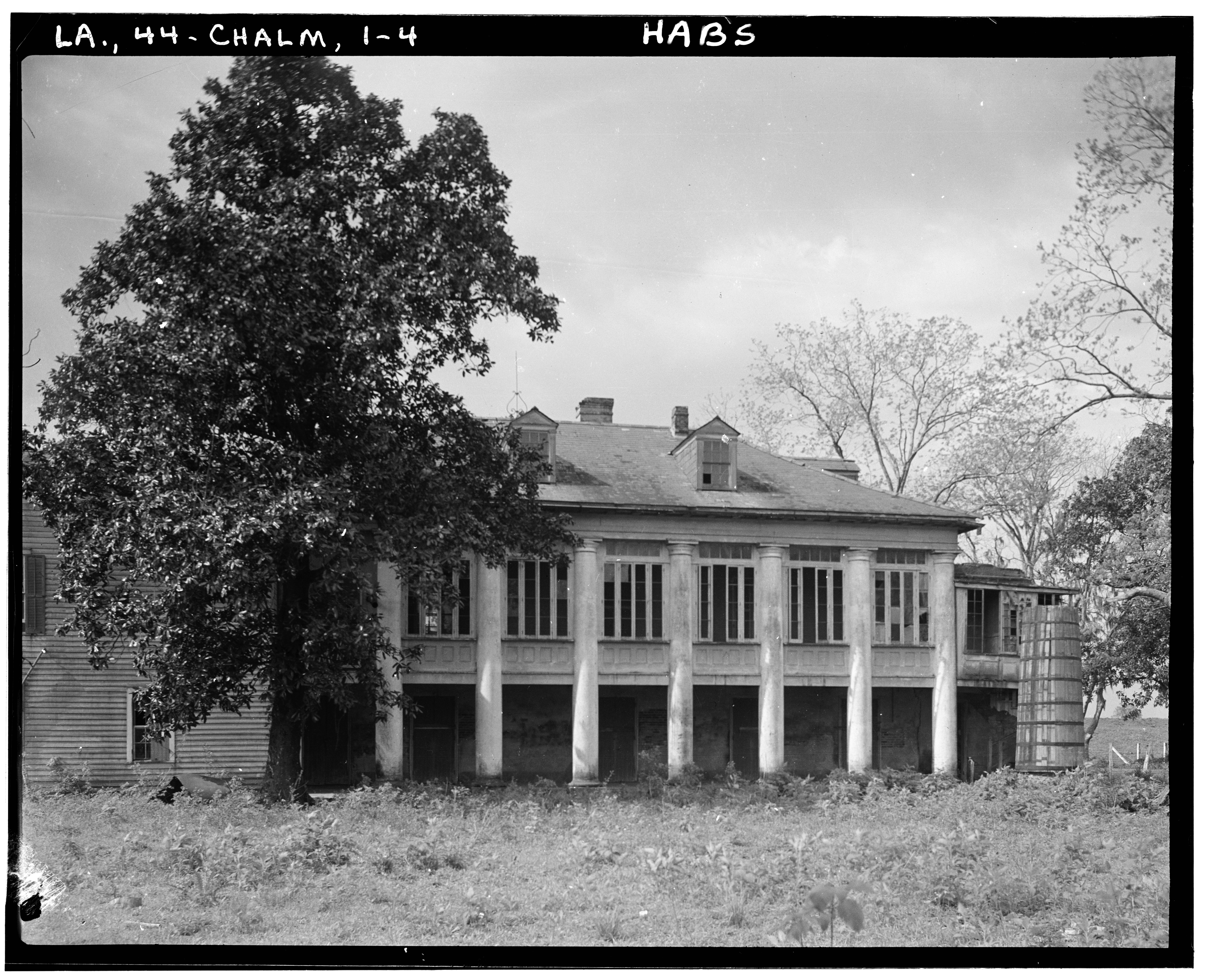
1937 Condition

== Rene Beauregard House restoration ==
Purchased by the National Park Service in 1949. Even though this house has had much time without residents, the National Park Service restored the mansion in 1965 at a cost of $247,000 all which was donated by prominent families from St Bernard Parish, including John J. Janusa, Anthony Mistrot and the Colomb Family making up the bulk of donations and is now part of the Chalmette National Battlefield.

The battlefield, located in St. Bernard Parish to the southeast of the Lower Ninth Ward that was decimated by the storm, is bordered by one of the levees that were breached during the category five hurricane in 2005.

While the damage was not as catastrophic as it was for much of the local community, the historic battlefield suffered substantial damage.

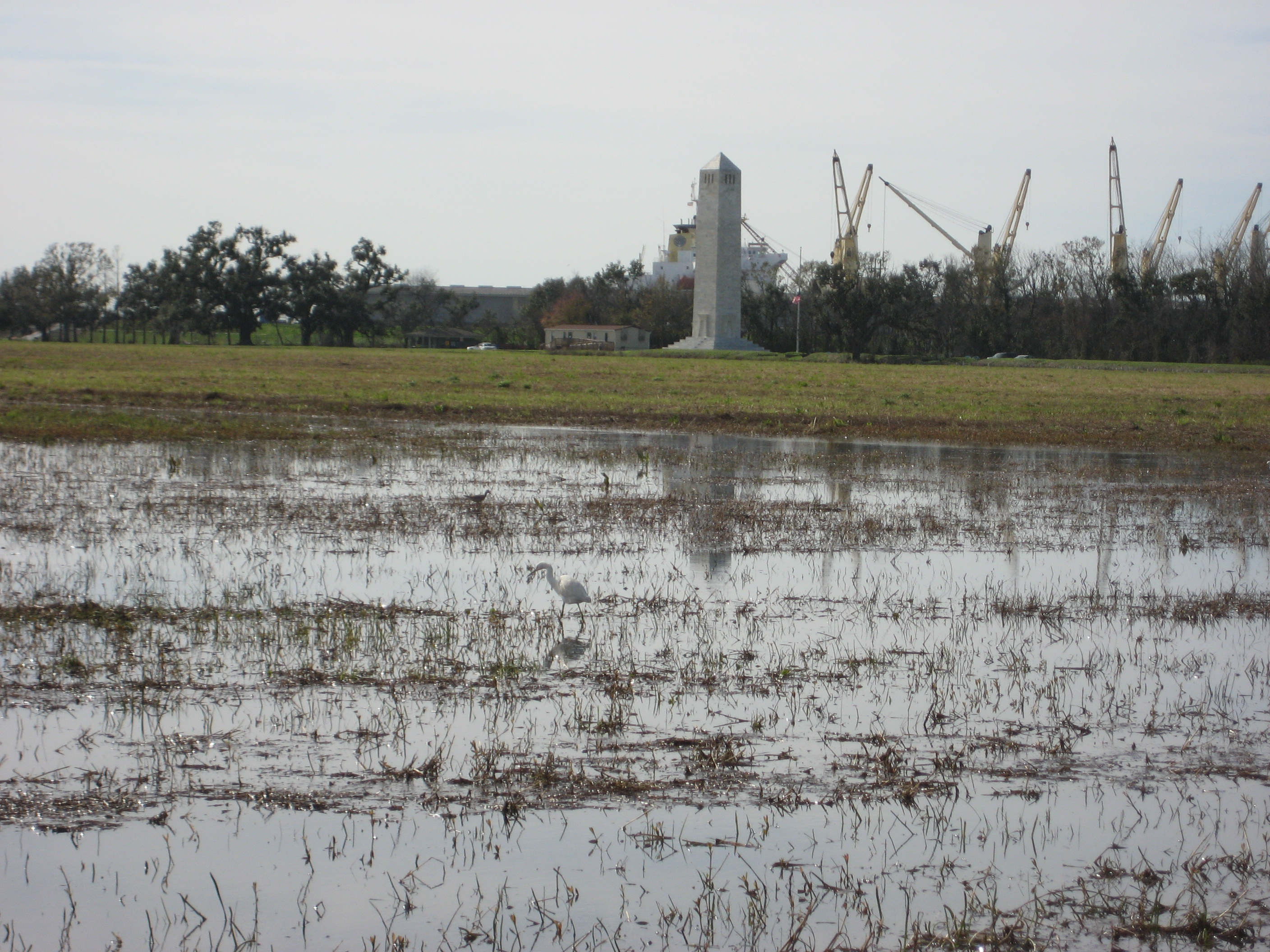
Battlefield marshland

Katrina flooded the entire parish of St. Bernard with 2–22 feet of water due to overtopping and levee breaches of the Mississippi River-Gulf Outlet (MRGO) in St. Bernard Parish and Industrial Canal in the lower 9th Ward of Orleans Parish. This resulted in the complete ruin of the park's visitor center and substantial damage to other structures including the historic Malus-Beauregard House, the Chalmette Monument, and Chalmette National Cemetery. The nearby Mississippi River levee was not overtopped or breached at any time during or after Katrina. MRGO has been dammed and the levees strengthened, however, all the land is sinking due to soil subsidence, saltwater intrusion, and levees blocking silt deposition.
