= Lower Ninth Ward =

Neighborhood in New Orleans, Louisiana, US

- Neighborhood
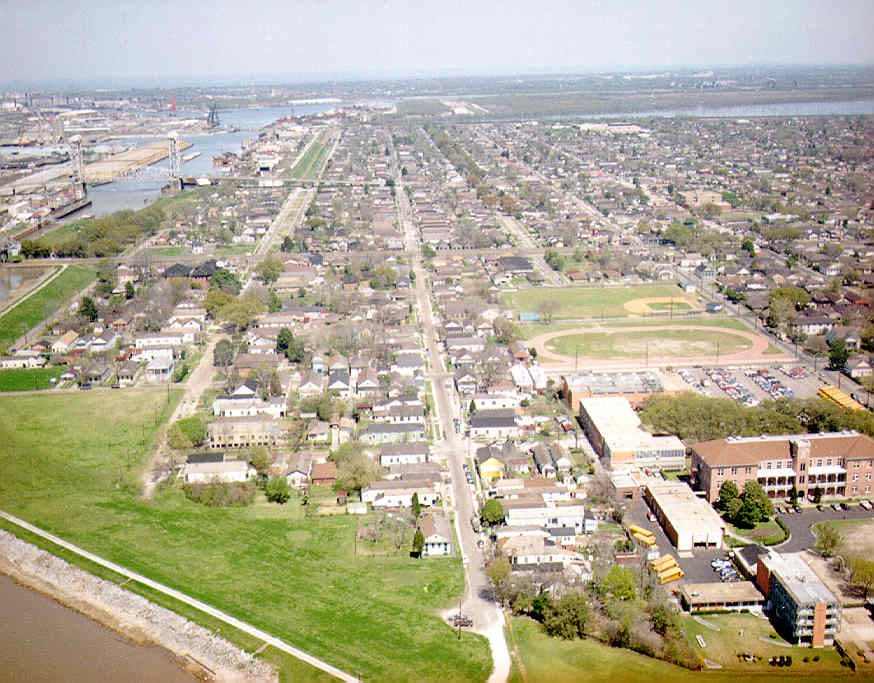
- Aerial view of part of the Lower 9th, c. 1990s. Holy Cross School at lower right.

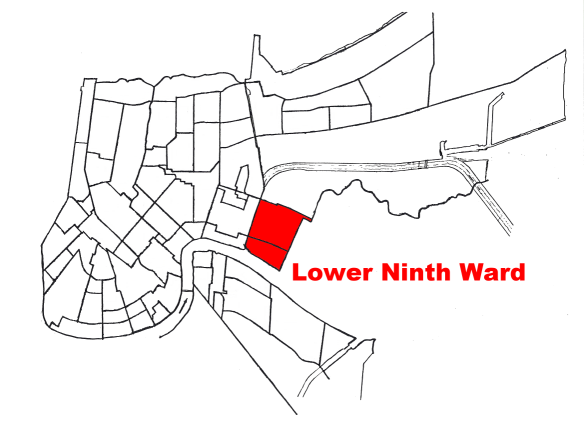
- The two Lower Ninth Ward neighborhoods; Holy Cross (below) and the Lower Ninth Ward (above)
- Coordinates: 29°58′13″N 90°00′46″W
- Country: United States
- State: Louisiana
- City: New Orleans
- Ward: 9th
- Added as a district: 1852

Area
  - Total: 2.25 sq mi (5.8 km^{2})
  - Land: 2.20 sq mi (5.7 km^{2})
  - Water: 0.05 sq mi (0.13 km^{2}) 2.58%

Population (2010)
  - Total: 5,560
  - Density: 2,530/sq mi (976/km^{2})
- Time zone: UTC−6 (CST)
  - Summer (DST): UTC−5 (CDT)
- Area code: 504
- Website: lowernine.org

The Lower Ninth Ward is a neighborhood in the city of New Orleans, Louisiana. As the name implies, it is part of the 9th Ward of New Orleans. The Lower Ninth Ward is often thought of as the entire area within New Orleans downriver of the Industrial Canal; however, the City Planning Commission divides this area into the Lower Ninth Ward and Holy Cross neighborhoods.

The term "Lower" refers to its location farther towards the mouth of the Mississippi River, downriver, "down" or "below" the rest of the city. The 9th Ward, like all wards of New Orleans, is a voting district. The 9th Ward was added as a voting district in 1852. The Lower 9th Ward is composed of Ward 9 Districts 1, 2, 4, and 7 which make up the Holy Cross Area and Ward 9 Districts 3, 5, 6, and 8. Higher voting district numbers in the 9th Ward (8–27) are on the upriver side of the Industrial Canal. The area came to international attention for its devastation in the aftermath of Hurricane Katrina in 2005.

== Geography ==
Excluding the industrial and swamp areas north of the Florida Canal, the neighborhood of the Lower 9th Ward is about 1.25 mi (2.01 km) from east to west and 2 mi (3.2 km) from north to south. Three major avenues cross the developed portion of the neighborhood, each with bridges over the Industrial Canal. Closest to the River is St. Claude Avenue; about midway through the neighborhood is Claiborne Avenue; Florida Avenue crosses at the northern edge of the historically populated portion of the Lower 9th. Most major businesses serving the neighborhood are located on St. Claude or Claiborne, although a smattering of additional neighborhood business is located throughout the area. While the first two of these three avenues continue into St. Bernard Parish; a continuation of Florida Avenue through and beyond the parish line has been repeatedly proposed but at present does not exist.

=== Adjacent neighborhoods ===
- Venetian Isles, New Orleans (north)
- Holy Cross, New Orleans (south)
- Bywater, New Orleans (west)

=== Adjacent communities ===
- Arabi, St. Bernard Parish (east)

=== Boundaries ===
The City Planning Commission defines the boundaries of Lower Ninth Ward as these streets: Florida Avenue, St. Bernard Parish, St. Claude Avenue and the Industrial Canal.

The Lower Ninth Ward is also commonly used to describe a slightly larger area. This area borders the Mississippi River to the South and St. Bernard Parish to the east. To the west is the Industrial Canal, across which is the Bywater section of New Orleans. The northern or inland boundary is often given as the Florida Canal with Florida Avenue, a levee, and railroad tracks running beside it. Alternatively, the industrial area north of Florida Avenue is sometimes included as part of the Lower 9th Ward, extending the boundary to the southern edge of the Gulf Intracoastal Waterway.

== History ==
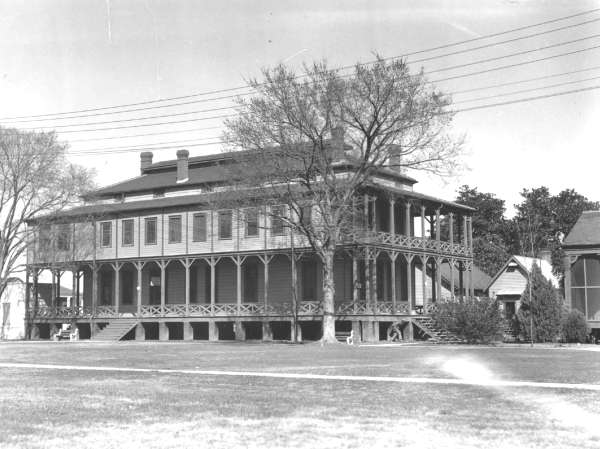
Building at Jackson Barracks complex, c. 1935. This one was demolished by the WPA that decade.

In Louisiana's colonial era, this area was developed as sugar cane plantations, with narrow tracts extending from river frontage that provided the transportation and shipping routes. At the start of the 19th century, the portion closer to the river was developed for residential use, at the same time as the Bywater area.

In 1834 the United States Army established the Jackson Barracks here. As late as the 1870s, the area behind Saint Claude Avenue was still mostly small farms with scattered residences. The area on the "woods" (away from the river) side of Claiborne was mostly undeveloped cypress swamp.

In 1852, the 9th Ward was added as an official district of New Orleans. In 1899 Louisiana passed a law allowing the ward to have drainage and sewage systems. The first bridge of the Port of New Orleans into the ward was completed in 1919.

What became the Lower 9th Ward did not become distinct from the upriver parts of the 9th Ward until the start of the 1920s, when the Industrial Canal was dredged. This development bisected the 9th Ward. At this time, people started referring to the area above (upriver) the Canal as the "Upper" 9th Ward, and this area as the "Lower."

The section on the River side of St. Claude Avenue, which developed as an urban area first, is sometimes called the "Holy Cross Neighborhood" for Holy Cross High School, the large Catholic school. For many years, it attracted students from throughout the city.

Construction of the Industrial Canal led to development of the land farther from the river along the Canal; it provided steady work for area laborers. As shipping became containerized in the later 20th century, however, demand for labor declined, with negative economic consequences for the neighborhood. Some people left to find work in other areas; others struggled with lower-paying jobs.

=== Hurricane Betsy ===
In 1965, Hurricane Betsy struck New Orleans. A levee on the Industrial Canal collapsed, and much of the Lower 9th Ward was flooded. President Lyndon B. Johnson visited the devastated flooded area shortly after the storm, and ordered aid for the storm victims.

=== Hurricane Katrina ===
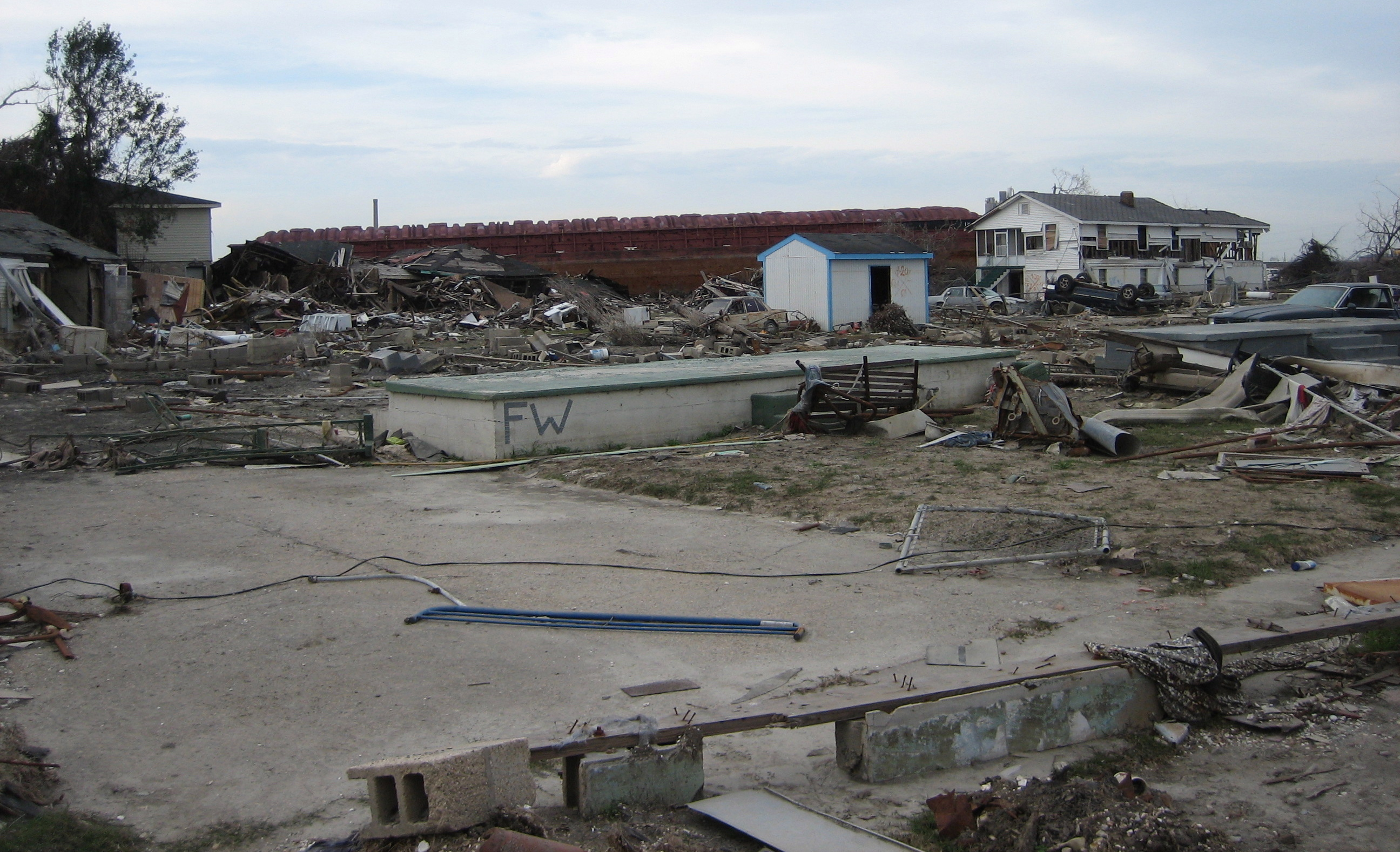
Ruins of residential area in the Lower 9th Ward, with ING 4727 barge in the background

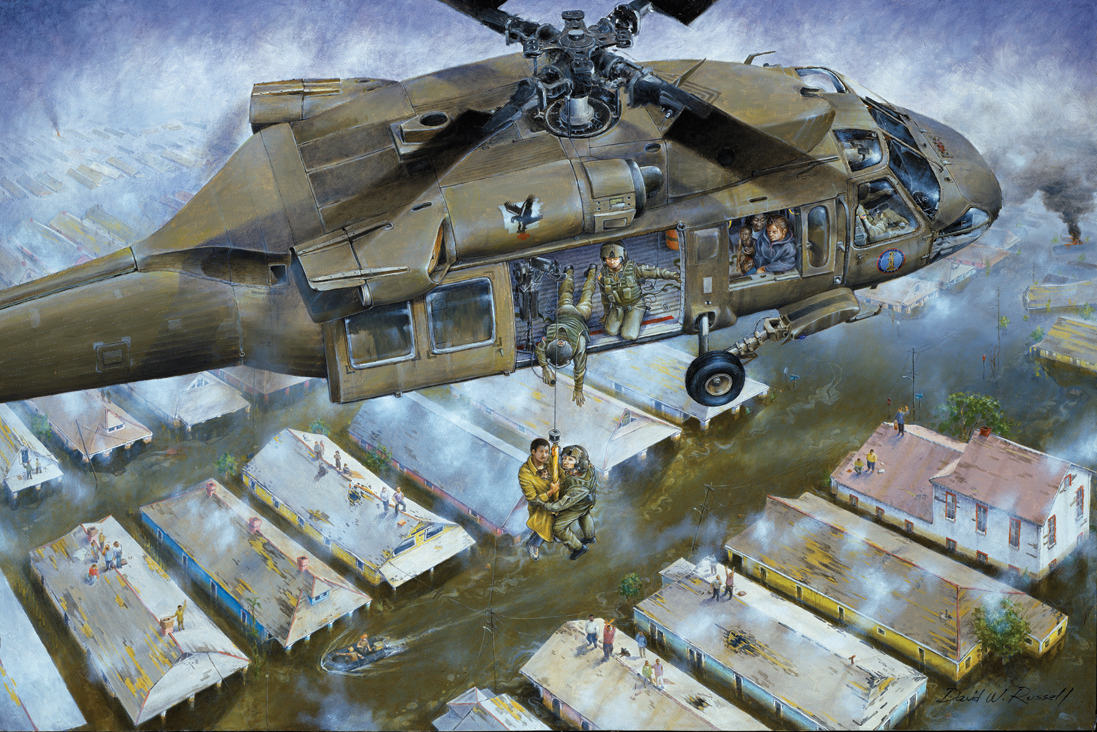
Painting depicting a National Guard helicopter rescuing people in the flooded Lower Ninth Ward

On August 29, 2005, Hurricane Katrina made landfall just east of New Orleans; the fifth deadliest hurricane and the costliest natural disaster in the history of the United States. At approximately 10:00 am, the levee wall protecting the Ward broke in multiple sections and flooded the area. Multiple breaches in the levees of at least four canals resulted in catastrophic flooding in a majority of the city.

Nowhere in the city was the devastation greater than in the Lower 9th Ward. This was largely due to the storm surge generated in the Mississippi River Gulf Outlet, a deep-draft shipping channel built by the Army Corps of Engineers in the late 1950s. The construction destroyed tens of thousands of acres of protective coastal wetlands that once acted as a storm surge buffer for the community.

Storm surge flood waters appear to have poured into the Lower Ninth Ward from at least three sources. To the east, water flowed in from Saint Bernard Parish, while to the west the Industrial Canal suffered two major breaches: one just south of Florida Avenue, the second between North Galvez and North Roman streets. The force of the water did not only flood homes, but smashed or knocked many off their foundations. A large barge, the ING 4727 (owned by the Ingram Barge Company), was swept by flood waters into the neighborhood through the breach near Claiborne Avenue, leveling homes beneath it. The storm surge was so great that even the highest portions of the Lower 9th were flooded; Holy Cross School, which had served as a dry refuge after Hurricane Betsy, was inundated. The foot of the Mississippi River levee, the area's highest point, took on some 2 to 3 feet (0.91 m) of water. In total, 72 bodies were found as of December 2005.

Destruction from the hurricane significantly affected the neighborhood's population. In 2010, there were an estimated 1,060 households in the area, down from 4,820 in 2000. Recovery has been slow, with an estimated 1,675 households in the community as of 2020.

The Lower 9th Ward was flooded again by Hurricane Rita a month later in September.

=== Recovery efforts ===
In December 2005, Common Ground Collective volunteers gutted the first house in the area. Volunteers and residents began gutting other houses in the community. Soon after, the Common Ground Collective opened the first distribution center in the area, in order to provide returning residents with water, food and other necessities.

Due to the great devastation and lack of population and services, the Lower Ninth Ward was the last area of the city still under a curfew half a year after the disaster. It was also the last area to have power and water restored, and the last to be pumped dry. Officially, residents were allowed in during daylight hours to look, salvage possessions, and leave, although some few had already done extensive work gutting and repairing their damaged homes in preparation to move back. By January 2006, the widespread damages and difficulties in restoring basic utilities and city services still prevented the official reopening of the Lower 9th Ward to residents who wished to return to live.

The most severely damaged section of the Ward was the lower elevation section, north of Claiborne Avenue. A Bring Back New Orleans Commission preliminary report suggested making this area in whole or part into park space because of the high risk of future flooding. Most Lower 9th Ward residents have strongly objected to this proposal, but outsiders worry about the high risk of future flooding in the area.

In March 2006 a group of residents and Common Ground Collective volunteers broke into Martin Luther King Elementary School to begin cleanup efforts. Not long after, the state school officials agreed to repair the school. The school has subsequently become a Recovery School District charter school and is running at full capacity.

In 2006, Mayor Ray Nagin threatened to use his powers of eminent domain to seize vacant, severely damaged properties in all of New Orleans that had not been gutted or scheduled to be gutted before early 2007. Such blighted properties had been creating serious problems for returned New Orleanians, including infestations of rats and other vermin. Similar actions to seize abandoned blighted property are in effect in other Louisiana parishes, as well as in Mississippi counties affected by the storm. However, as hundreds of thousands of locals were still waiting for promised insurance or Road Home money, many of the poor lacked resources to work on their houses. The neighborhood had few stores and only a handful of schools reopened.

By early 2007, a small number of local businesses in the area reopened, and residents began to return, many living in FEMA trailers as they rebuilt (the last FEMA trailer was removed in 2012). However, much of the area was still little-populated and in ruined condition. Work crews continued to remove debris and demolish unrepairable houses daily, but hundreds if not thousands were vacant and gutted. Many more buildings had hardly been touched since the waters were drained, and ruined possessions were still inside severely damaged buildings.

On December 3, 2007, Make It Right Foundation, founded by the actor Brad Pitt, committed to rebuild 150 houses in the Lower Ninth Ward. The houses are sustainable, energy-efficient and safe. Make It Right homes were designed by award-winning architects from New Orleans and around the world, including Frank Gehry, Shigeru Ban, Hitoshi Abe and Thom Mayne. Pitt stated: "I walked into it blind, just thinking, 'People need homes; I know people who make great homes.'" As of March 2012, the foundation has rebuilt about 80 solar-paneled homes.

In the spring of 2008, Build Now, a local, non-profit homebuilder, began working to bring New Orleans families back home. It constructed site-built, stilt houses on hurricane-damaged lots. The homes reflect the style and quality of traditional New Orleans architecture but are built above potential flood waters. Build Now is in the process of bringing more than a dozen New Orleans families back home; nine houses are currently under construction in the Upper and Lower Ninth Ward areas, Lakeview and Gentilly. The organization has moved three New Orleans families back home.

As of September 2008, 3 years after Katrina, hundreds of houses have been rebuilt and renovated, and dozens of new homes have been constructed. Volunteers continue to come to the area in mass numbers, working for dozens of organizations including Common Ground Relief, formerly Common Ground Collective; and lowernine.org, a grassroots organization that coordinates volunteers' and residents' efforts in rebuilding homes in the Lower Ninth Ward.

Residents and volunteers are striving to make the Lower Ninth Ward a sustainable community. They are working to restore the local wetlands, lower the crime, and control weed overgrowth. It is widely believed that if it were not for the extensive canal dredging to support commercial development, resulting in subsequent wetlands subsidence, the Lower Ninth Ward would not have suffered such extensive flooding during Katrina.

In September 2011, New Orleans mayor Mitch Landrieu, announced a landscaping maintenance program called the "Nuisance Lot Maintenance Program", to attempt to clear the overgrown lots in the Lower Ninth. The program consists of 12 men, residents of the Ward or ex-offenders, going block-by-block to maintain the overgrowth. As of 2012, the program has cleared more than 1,200 lots. However, as of September 2016, there are still many overgrown lots remaining, and the program has been diminishing in effort and organization due to a lack of funds and motivation, since it is difficult to control overgrowth due to the rapid speed at which grass grows.

In March 2012, the New York Times described what the area looked like almost seven years after Katrina:

"The neighborhood has become a dumping ground for many kinds of unwanted things. It no longer resembled an urban, or even suburban environment. Where once there stood orderly rows of single-family homes with driveways and front yards, there was jungle."

— Nathaniel Rich, Jungleland: The Lower Ninth Ward in New Orleans Gives New Meaning to 'Urban Growth'

As of October 2017, lowernine.org has fully rebuilt 88 homes, and completed repair and renovation projects on over 250 more properties.

== Demographics ==
As of the census of 2000, there were 14,008 people, 4,820 households, and 3,467 families residing in the neighborhood. The population density was 9,731 /mi^{2} (3,730 /km^{2}).

As of the census of 2010, there were 2,842 people, 1,061 households, and 683 families residing in the neighborhood.

== Points of interest ==
=== Notable buildings ===
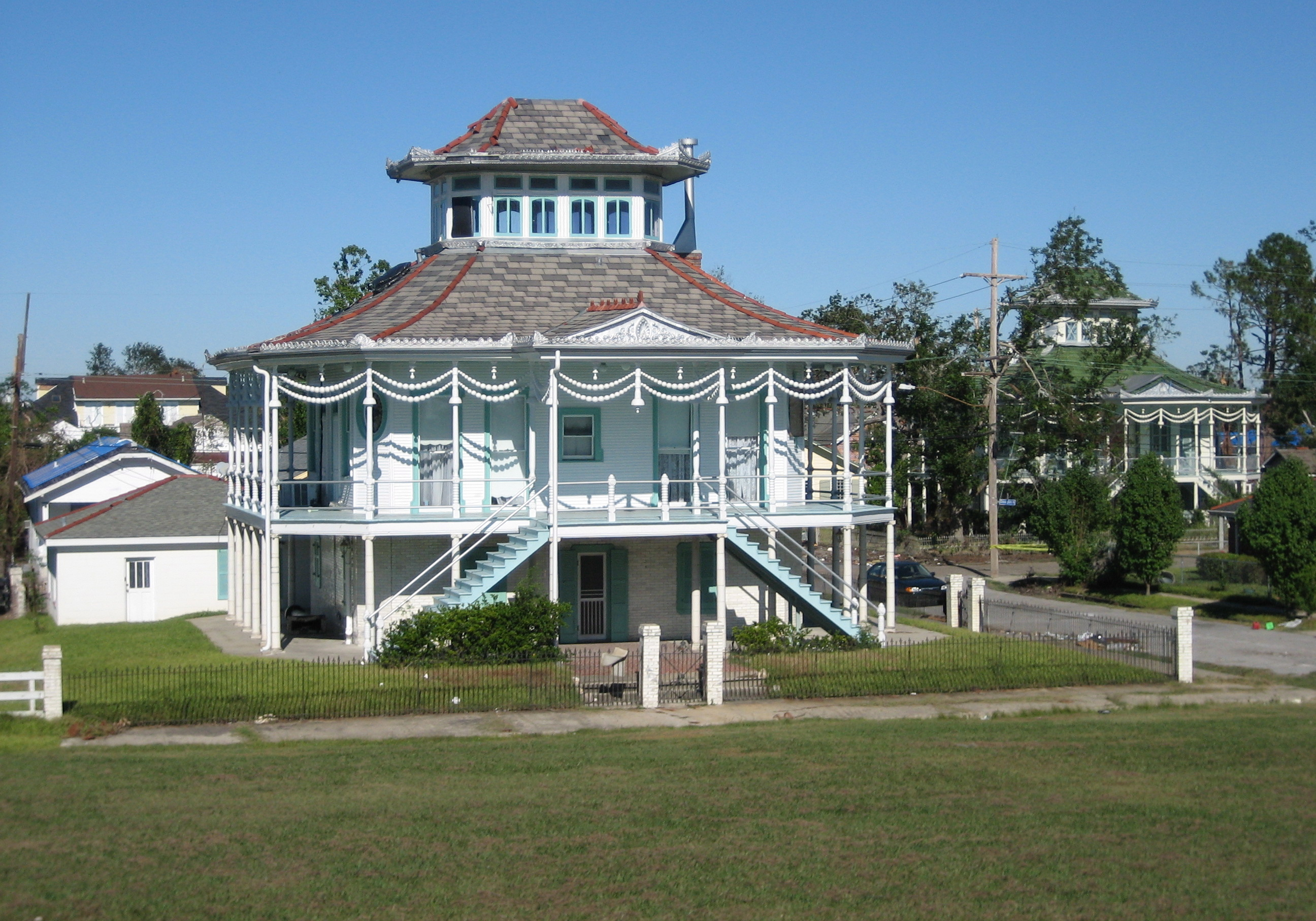
The Doullut "steamboat houses", from the start of the 20th century, are landmarks of the Holy Cross section of the Lower 9th Ward.

The Lower Ninth Ward is home to the Jackson Barracks. The barracks now serve as headquarters for the Louisiana National Guard. The complex had an extensive military museum in the old powder magazine and in a new annex, with a large collection of military items from every American war. The 2000 NRA Shooting Sports Camp and Coaches School was held at Jackson Barracks from June 28 – July 2, 2000.

The Doullut steamboat houses are located on either side of Egania Street at numbers 400 and 503. The first house, closer to the river, was built in 1905 by Captain Milton P. Doullut, a riverboat pilot, as his home. The second was built in 1913 for his son Paul Doullut. In 1977 both houses were designated historic landmarks. The houses have two notable design influences, the first being the steamboats of the period, the second being the Japanese exhibit at the 1904 World's Fair in St. Louis (Louisiana Purchase Exposition). Notably, Mary Doullut (wife of Milton) was also a river boat captain, who worked on the river for over 30 years; she is believed to be the first woman to have held a Mississippi riverboat pilot's license.

=== Parks ===
Local parks include the Lee Playground and Sankofa Wetland Park and Nature Trail.

== Notable people ==
- Pat Barry, kickboxer and mixed martial artist
- Fats Domino, musician and singer-songwriter
- Marshall Faulk, NFL star
- Kevin Gates, rapper and hip-hop artist
- D. J. Fluker, NFL player
- Fred Luter, Baptist minister, president of the Southern Baptist Convention
- Magic, rapper and musician
- Robert Pack, NBA player and coach
- Eldridge Recasner, former NBA player
- Dawn Richard, singer-songwriter, actress and animator
- Kalamu ya Salaam, poet and author
- Catherine Seals, religious leader

== Education ==
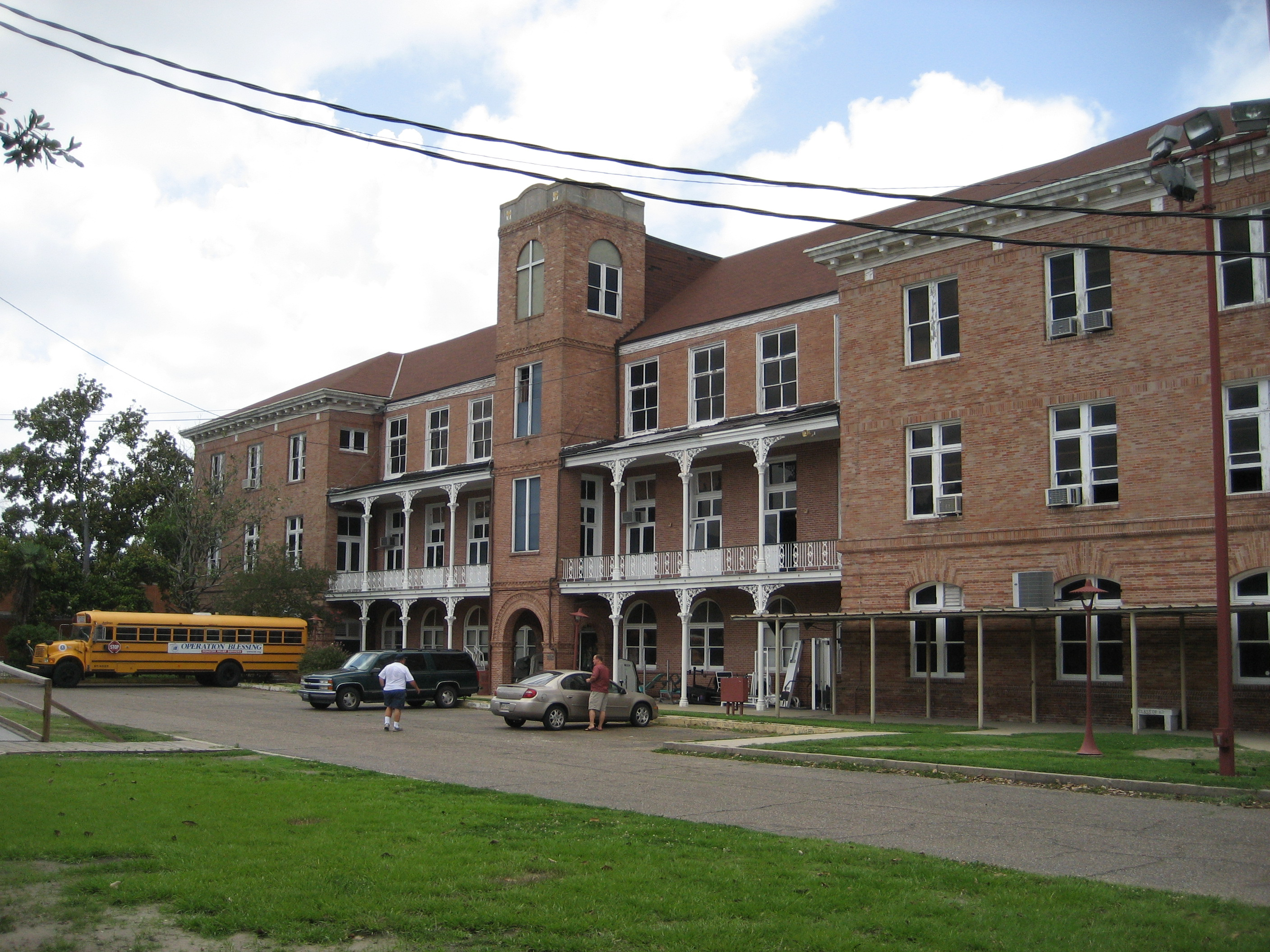
The former Holy Cross High School

New Orleans Public Schools operates district public schools, while Recovery School District oversees charter schools.

Dr. King Charter School (K-12) is located in the Lower 9th.

Alfred Lawless High School was the only public high school that operated in the Lower 9th until Hurricane Katrina affected New Orleans on August 29, 2005. The previous Holy Cross High School campus was located in the Lower Ninth Ward. In August 2007 students from Carver High School and Marshall Middle School began studying at temporary trailers on the site of Holy Cross. In September of that year the students were to move to another set of trailers in the original Carver/Marshall campus in the Desire Area.

== In popular culture ==
- The 1994 film adaptation of Anne Rice's Interview with the Vampire, starring Brad Pitt and Tom Cruise, was filmed along sections of the Mississippi River embankment and inside the Jackson Barracks.
- When the Levees Broke (2006), a documentary about the Katrina disaster directed by Spike Lee, was produced and shown on HBO. The film covered damage in the Lower Ninth Ward and other areas of the city.
- Your Honor, a 2020 American television limited series, features the Lower Ninth Ward and its people there who are affected by drug addiction, poverty, violence and gang activity.
- Cut Throat City is a 2020 American heist film featuring four young men from the Lower Ninth Ward who turn to a life of crime to escape poverty just after Hurricane Katrina.
- F the Police, a 1989 song by the rap group N.W.A, inspired then-12-year-old Dwight Twin Leblanc, after he was shot by police, to coin the name "Cross The Canal" (C.T.C.) in hopes of uniting his entire neighborhood against police corruption and community wide violence.

== See also ==
- New Orleans neighborhoods
- New Orleans, Louisiana
- Wards of New Orleans
- Hurricane Katrina
- Oil Storm
