= Sankofa Wetland Park and Nature Trail =

Park in New Orleans, Louisiana, United States

Coordinates: 29°58′39″N 90°0′30″W

Sankofa Wetland Park and Nature Trail is a public park in the Lower Ninth Ward neighborhood of New Orleans, Louisiana, United States. Construction of the park began in 2017 and is ongoing as of 2026. Once completed, the park will be 42 acres (17 ha), extending from Dubreil Street to Tennessee Street along Florida Avenue. The park is part of community and municipal efforts to revitalize the neighborhood and promote economic development following damage from Hurricane Katrina, as well as prevent future damage from flooding.

Current plans include a 10-acre wetland pond, nature trails, picnic areas and a multi-use bicycle trail. The park is also used as a space to host community events, and is a popular spot for birders hoping to see rare species.

== History ==
Planning of the park was started in 2014 by the Sankofa Community Development Corporation, in response to the devastation from Hurricane Katrina. Historically, the land had been used for hunting, fishing, and crabbing. However, the construction of the Mississippi River Gulf Outlet in the 1960s resulted in increased salinity from seawater from the Gulf of Mexico, which altered the landscape significantly. At the time, the land contained waste and invasive species, as a result of illegal dumping and a lack of municipal maintenance.

Construction began in 2017, after the organization entered a 20-year partnership with the City of New Orleans, which owns the land. Construction involved replacing these invasive species with native flora, such as irises, bald cypresses and water tulepos, which were grown in nearby greenhouses. The project relied on volunteer labor to remove invasive trees. The unexpected discovery of over 27,000 cubic meters of trash underground delayed the project, requiring special equipment for removal.

In 2019, the first two acres of the park opened. Subsequent planning was done with community input and assistance from the National Park Service's Rivers, Trails, and Conservation Assistance Program and Southeastern University. The park's wetland ponds were designed with help from the New Orleans chapter of Engineers Without Borders.

Additional assistance has come from partnerships with the Coastal Protection Restoration Authority and the New Orleans Sewerage and Water Board, among other organizations.

In 2021, the park's wetlands may have helped alleviate storm surges during Hurricane Ida.

As of 2024, the park was slated to be completed in fall 2025. As of January 2025, 8 acres of the park had been restored, with plans to build an on-site plant nursery for regional wetland trees and shrubs, which would also be used for community gardening activities. In March 2025, an environmental review of the project was completed, and funding had been secured for the remaining parts of the project, with construction expected to begin in late 2025.

== Environment and geography ==
The park's native wetlands are expected to increase the surrounding neighborhood's resilience to flooding by acting as a reservoir. The park lies at the lowest point of the Lower Ninth Ward.

As a result of the planting of native species, the park is thought to be habitat to various birds, reptiles, amphibians, beavers and otters and as of 2026, birders have spotted over 200 distinct species in the park. The thick understory of the park's mature trees, unusual for an urban park, make it particularly attractive to migratory birds.
