= Korey Williams =

American gridiron football player (born 1987)

No. 8, 1
- Position: Wide receiver

Personal information
- Born: July 11, 1987 (age 39); New Orleans, Louisiana, U.S.
- Listed height: 6 ft 0 in (1.83 m)
- Listed weight: 185 lb (84 kg)

Career information
- High school: Alfred Lawless (New Orleans)
- College: Northwestern Oklahoma State
- NFL draft: 2011: undrafted

Career history
- Omaha Beef (2012); Sioux Falls Storm (2012); BC Lions (2013–2014); Saskatchewan Roughriders (2014–2015); Sioux Falls Storm (2016–2017)

Awards and highlights
- United Bowl champion (2016); IFL Special Teams Player of the Year (2016); First-team All-IFL (2016)

Career CFL statistics
- Receptions: 28
- Receiving yards: 434
- Receiving TDs: 2
- Rushing yards: 72
- Rushing TDs: 1
- Stats at CFL.ca (archived)

Korey Williams
Medal record

Men's American football

Representing United States

World Championship
Gold medal – first place	2011 Austria	Team competition

Korey Williams (born July 11, 1987) is an American former professional football wide receiver who played in the Canadian Football League (CFL) for the BC Lions and Saskatchewan Roughriders. He played college football at Northwestern Oklahoma State University.

== Early life and college ==
Korey Williams was born on July 11, 1987, in New Orleans, Louisiana. He attended Alfred Lawless High School in New Orleans. He participated in football, baseball, basketball, and track in high school.

Williams first enrolled at the University of Louisiana Monroe in 2005 and Paul Quinn College in 2006 but did not end up playing football at either school. He was a member of the Northwestern Oklahoma State Rangers of Northwestern Oklahoma State University from 2007 to 2010.

Williams was part of the United States men's national American football team at the 2011 IFAF World Championship. The U.S. won the tournament.

== Professional career ==
Williams started the 2012 Indoor Football League season with the Omaha Beef before being released.

Williams was signed by the Sioux Falls Storm of the IFL and had 1,329 all purpose yards and 18 touchdowns in 10 games during the 2012 season. He re-signed with the Storm for the 2013 season. However in February 2013, before the start of the 2013 IFL season, it was reported that Williams was leaving for the BC Lions of the Canadian Football League (CFL).

Williams was signed by the BC Lions on May 13, 2013. He dressed in four games, starting two, for the Lions in 2013, totaling seven receptions for 112 yards and one touchdown on 11 targets, one carry for 41 yards, 15 punt returns for 56 yards, and six kickoff returns for 64 yards. He dressed in two games, both starts, during the 2014 season, catching four passes for 68 yards while also rushing three times for 13 yards. Williams was released by the Lions on July 15, 2014.

Williams was signed by the Saskatchewan Roughriders of the CFL on July 29, 2014. He dressed in four games, all starts, for the Roughriders in 2014, recording ten receptions for 142 yards and one touchdown, and one rush for an 18 yard touchdown. He dressed in four games, starting two, during the 2015 season and caught seven passes for 112 yards on ten targets. Williams was released by the Roughriders on September 9, 2015.

On November 3, 2015, Williams returned to the Sioux Falls Storm. He helped the Storm win the 2016 United Bowl. Following the 2016 season, Williams was named first-team All-IFL as a kick returner. He was also named the IFL Special Teams Player of the Year. He played for the Storm in 2017 as well.
