= Holy Cross, New Orleans =

Neighborhood in Louisiana, US

Holy Cross
- New Orleans Neighborhood
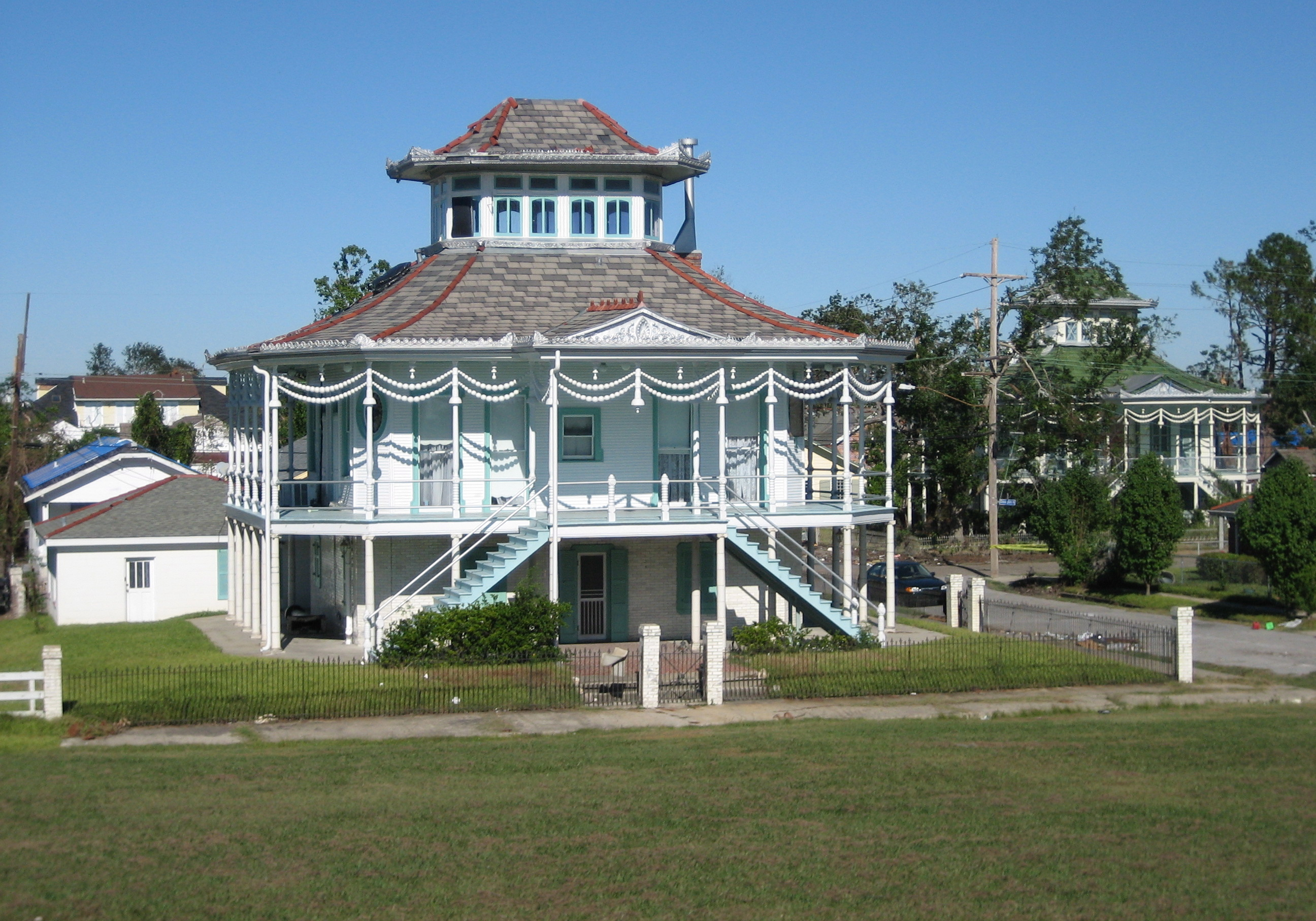
- The Doullut "Steamboat houses" from the start of the 20th century

- Map showing Holy Cross in Louisiana
- Coordinates: 29°57′30″N 90°01′04″W
- Country: United States
- State: Louisiana
- City: New Orleans
- Planning District: District 7, Bywater District

Area
  - Total: 0.95 sq mi (2.5 km^{2})
  - Land: 0.68 sq mi (1.8 km^{2})
  - Water: 0.27 sq mi (0.70 km^{2})
- Elevation: 3 ft (0.91 m)

Population (2010)
  - Total: 1,226
  - Density: 1,800/sq mi (700/km^{2})
- Time zone: UTC-6 (CST)
  - Summer (DST): UTC-5 (CDT)
- Area code: 504

Holy Cross is a neighborhood of the city of New Orleans. A subdistrict of the Lower Ninth Ward District Area, its boundaries as defined by the City Planning Commission are: St. Claude Avenue to the north, St. Bernard Parish to the east, the Mississippi River to the south and the Industrial Canal to the west.

== Geography ==
Holy Cross is located at 29°57′30″N 90°01′04″W and has an elevation of 3 feet (0.9 m). According to the United States Census Bureau, the district has a total area of 0.95 square miles (2.5 km^{2}). 0.68 square miles (1.8 km^{2}) of which is land and 0.27 square miles (0.7 km^{2}) (28.42%) of which is water.

=== Adjacent neighborhoods ===
- Lower Ninth Ward (north)
- St. Bernard Parish (east)
- Mississippi River (south)
- Bywater (west)

=== Boundaries ===
The City Planning Commission defines the boundaries of Holy Cross as these streets: St. Claude Avenue, St. Bernard Parish, the Mississippi River and the Industrial Canal.

== Demographics ==
As of the census of 2000, there were 5,507 people, 1,982 households, and 1,315 families residing in the neighborhood. The population density was 8,099 /mi^{2} (3,059 /km^{2}).

As of the census of 2010, there were 2,714 people, 1,040 households, and 642 families residing in the neighborhood.

== Holy Cross School ==
In 1849, the Congregation of the Holy Cross purchased what was once known as Reynes Farm and built St. Isidore's College, later known as the Holy Cross School, as an all-boys school. The surrounding neighborhood soon took its name from the school. The original campus at 4950 Dauphine Street was destroyed by Hurricane Katrina on August 29, 2005, allowing the school to use FEMA funds to relocate to the Gentilly neighborhood. The historic building now stands abandoned and in danger of demolition by neglect. In August 2012, a portion of the old campus was sold to Perez Architects, which proposed building a 180-unit riverfront apartment complex and immediately applied for a zoning change to increase the height limitations. Opposition from residents arose because the proposed development would negatively impact the historic nature of the neighborhood and create increased density and traffic congestion. Supporters of the plan claimed the project, which also called for storefront and restaurant development, would bring jobs to the area. There has been no progress regarding restoration. The school's administration building has been placed on the Louisiana Trust for Historic Preservation's "Most Endangered Places List." The developer has withdrawn from the project and Perez does not have funds for needed repairs, including a new roof.

== See also ==
- Neighborhoods in New Orleans
