= Alfred Lawless High School =

Former high school in New Orleans

Coordinates: 29.9762°N 90.0144°W

Alfred Lawless High School was a public high school and junior high school in the Lower Ninth Ward of New Orleans, Louisiana, United States.

== History ==
As a part of the New Orleans Public Schools, Lawless opened its doors to African American students on January 27, 1964, as historically the first high school in the Lower Ninth Ward.

Prior to Hurricane Katrina on August 29, 2005, the school had about 900 students. The campus was severely damaged by Katrina. The 43-year-old facility was among those that received the most damage. The floodwaters moved some buildings off of their foundations.

As of 2007, Federal Emergency Management Agency (FEMA) officials and State of Louisiana education leaders were discussing the level of damage over the school, causing no action to be taken on the school. FEMA stated a belief that of the six buildings, at least one could have been saved. State education leaders argued that all of the school was totally destroyed.

Many in the community, including former students, met at community meetings to inquire about the rebuilding of a high school in the Lower Ninth Ward. On a City of New Orleans website concerning the FEMA Recovery Fund in 2013, announcing the groundbreaking for the new Sanchez Center in the Lower Ninth Ward, Mayor Landrieu also addressed how he worked with the Louisiana Recovery School District to ensure the rebuilding of the $37.5 million Alfred Lawless High School which was destroyed by Hurricane Katrina. Despite discussions about rebuilding the school, it never reopened after Hurricane Katrina.

== Notable students and alumni of the junior and senior high school ==
- Fred Luter - Senior Pastor of Franklin Avenue Baptist Church; first African American President of the Southern Baptist Convention
- Robert Pack - NBA point guard
- Eldridge Recasner - NBA guard
- Kermit Ruffins - award-winning trumpet player; band leader of the BBQ Swingers; co-founder of the Rebirth Brass Band
- Korey Williams - CFL wide receiver
