= Eldridge Recasner =

American basketball player (born 1967)

Personal information
- Born: December 14, 1967 (age 58) New Orleans, Louisiana, U.S.
- Listed height: 6 ft 3 in (1.91 m)
- Listed weight: 190 lb (86 kg)

Career information
- High school: Alfred Lawless (New Orleans, Louisiana)
- College: Washington (1986–1990)
- NBA draft: 1990: undrafted
- Playing career: 1990–2002
- Position: Point guard / shooting guard
- Number: 7, 3, 5, 14

Career history
- 1990–1991: TTL Bamberg
- 1991–1992: Louisville Shooters
- 1992: Presto Ice Cream Kings
- 1992–1993: Yakima Sun Kings
- 1993–1994: Galatasaray
- 1994–1995: Yakima Sun Kings
- 1995: Denver Nuggets
- 1995–1996: Houston Rockets
- 1996–1998: Atlanta Hawks
- 1999–2001: Charlotte Hornets
- 2001–2002: Los Angeles Clippers

Career highlights
- CBA champion (1995); CBA Most Valuable Player (1995); All-CBA First Team (1995); 3× All-Pac-10 (1988–1990); Pac-10 All-Freshman team (1987)

Career NBA statistics
- 3-point FG %: 41%
- free throw %: 89%
- Games: 296
- Stats at NBA.com
- Stats at Basketball Reference
Medals
Men's basketball
Representing United States
FIBA Americas Championship
Gold medal – first place	1993 San Juan	Team competition

Eldridge David Recasner (born December 14, 1967) is an American former professional basketball player. In college, he was a three-time All-Pac-10 Conference combo guard for the Washington Huskies. After college, he played in a variety of professional leagues such as the Continental Basketball Association (CBA), Europe and the Philippine Basketball Association before entering the NBA. He subsequently played for several National Basketball Association (NBA) teams including the Denver Nuggets, Houston Rockets, Atlanta Hawks, Charlotte Hornets and Los Angeles Clippers.

In the 1994–95 season, his fifth season after college, he earned the CBA MVP award while leading the Yakima Sun Kings to the league championship. After that CBA season was completed, he signed to play in the NBA at the end of the 1994–95 NBA season for the Nuggets. The following season, he earned a spot on the roster of the two-time defending champion Rockets. He played in the NBA for seven more seasons. He had a career 41% three-point shot field goal percentage and 89% free throw percentage in eight NBA seasons. In each of his first four full seasons in the NBA, he shot at least 40% from the three-point line, but he suffered injuries as a passenger during an accident in an automobile driven by Derrick Coleman before the 1999–2000 season and never achieved the same level of success after the accident. He later became an assistant coach for the Sioux Falls Skyforce.

== Amateur career ==
Born in New Orleans, Louisiana, Recasner was introduced to basketball in fifth grade by his uncles. His first organized game was in junior high school. During the first game, Recasner scored on the wrong basket because he had learned the game on a half-court one-basket basketball court. While growing up, he admired Dr. J, George Gervin, and Marques Johnson. He attended Alfred Lawless High School in New Orleans and was a high school teammate with Robert Pack. Recasner was a senior when Pack was a sophomore. Recasner was a better professional prospect than Pack and outscored Gary Payton five of nine times when the two point guards opposed each other in college. In junior high, Recasner wore jersey number 32 before switching to number 14 in high school in honor of his birthday, December 14, 1967.

Recasner attended University of Washington where he played for the Huskies. He redshirted during his freshman 1985–86 season. Recasner was a member of the 1990 class at Washington, and he was a three-time All-Pac-10 guard who was selected to the Washington Huskies all-20th-century team. He was the first three-time captain of the Huskies. He led the Pac-10 in free throw shooting as a senior (88.4%). Recasner was an architecture major at Washington by his own account, but another account claims he was a black history major. Recasner once scored 29 points against the undefeated and number one ranked Arizona Wildcats men's basketball team while guarding Sean Elliott. The Wildcats won the game while scoring the most points the Huskies had ever given up (109).

== Professional career ==
Recasner, a 6 ft 3 in (1.91 m), 190 pounds (86 kg) guard, was never selected in the NBA draft. However, after spending the 1990–91 season with TTL Bamberg in Germany, he played in the Global Basketball Association in 1991–92. He also played in the Philippine Basketball Association (PBA) for the Presto Ice Cream Kings together with Allan Caidic, Vergel Meneses, Onchie dela Cruz and others while he played during the Third Conference. Then, he returned to Washington to play in the Continental Basketball Association (CBA) during the 1992–93 and 1994–95 seasons. He played in the CBA for the franchise located in Yakima, Washington, which was near to the Seattle metropolitan area where the University of Washington was located. He played in Turkey in 1993–94. After leading the Yakima Sun Kings to the CBA championships as the CBA Most Valuable Player, he signed to a 10-day contract with the Denver Nuggets on March 3, 1995, and played in three games. For the 1995–96 NBA season he signed as a free agent with the Houston Rockets. He signed as a free agent with the Atlanta Hawks for the 1996–97 and 1997–98 seasons. He then signed with the Charlotte Hornets in January of the 1998–99 season where he stayed for parts of four seasons. He ended his career with two 10-day contracts for the L.A. Clippers in January 2002 after having been waived by the team.

Recasner himself considers being signed by the two-time defending NBA Champions Houston Rockets the highlight of his career. At that point he had gone from playing in the CBA to the best team in the NBA. Recasner earned the starting point guard spot over Kenny Smith and Sam Cassell. In one of his first games as a starter, he went five for six from the three-point line in the fourth quarter against the Detroit Pistons. Unfortunately, by the end of the season the Rockets had several players injured and several CBA players on their roster.

His most productive seasons were the two seasons with Atlanta where he totaled over 250 rebounds, 200 assists and nearly 1000 points in 130 games. He played in four post-seasons with three teams. Three of the four teams advanced to the second round of the NBA playoffs. Recasner posted a career 41% (239–584) three-point shot field goal percentage and ranked in the league's top 10 during the 1997–98 season with a 62–148 (.419) shooting percentage. His 1995–96 season three point statistics were better at 81–191 (.424), but he did not rank in the top 10 that season. He also posted an 89% (235–265) career free throw percentage.

"We played the Bulls in the second round of the [1997] playoffs. I remember hitting two 3-pointers on Steve Kerr, and Phil Jackson called a timeout to break the momentum. After the timeout, Michael Jordan switched over to defend me, and I remember asking him, 'Wait a second, what are you doing?' Jordan quickly responded, 'I'm here to shut you down,' and he smiled."

— Eldridge Recasner

In a 1997 NBA Playoff game against the Chicago Bulls he got hot and scored 11 quick points in the fourth quarter to nearly help the Hawks comeback in the game to even the second-round playoff series at two games apiece. At one point after a hot shooting streak, the Bulls assigned Michael Jordan to defend Recasner and the Bulls then stopped the comeback. Recasner's defense also pressured Jordan into a travelling violation in the final minute of the game. However, efforts by Michael Jordan and Scottie Pippen saved the day for the Bulls.

Recasner was such a good free throw shooter that once in 1998 during the midst of a 36 consecutive successful free throw streak he was fouled in a two-shot foul situation with his team down by three points and 2.3 seconds left. His team needed him to make the first and miss the second, but he was unable to miss.

On October 27, 1999, he was hospitalized in an automobile driven by Derrick Coleman. Coleman had been driving a Sport utility vehicle and had collided with a tractor trailer and was charged with drunk driving. Coleman was eventually acquitted of the charges and found guilty of "unsafe movement". Recasner endured a fractured right shoulder, partially collapsed lung and other injuries, and a female passenger was also hospitalized. He missed 52 games due to the accident and when he returned to the lineup he only played in seven games. Recasner was very upset with Coleman who did not even check in on whether Recasner was O.K. for over a week after the accident. On Christmas Eve 1999 during his time on the injured reserve, Recasner dragged a Continental Airlines clerk across a table by his necktie in frustration while attempting to book a flight to Texas to visit his sister, who was involved in a serious car accident. Recasner was uncertain whether his sister would survive. He pleaded guilty to misdemeanor fourth-degree assault and was sentenced to a 24-month deferred sentence, 45 hours of community service and ordered to pay $200 in court costs.

In 2004, he was named assistant coach of the Bellevue Blackhawks of the American Basketball Association.

== Personal ==
Recasner lives in Bellevue, Washington, during the off-season. He and his wife Karen have four children: Sydney, Erin, Lauren, and Eldridge III. Recasner had wed on August 14, 1993. During his NBA career his mother, Joyce, and sister, Schwuan, lived in New Orleans, but he lived in Bellevue.

== Career statistics ==
Legend
GP	Games played	GS	Games started	MPG	Minutes per game
FG%	Field goal percentage	3P%	3-point field goal percentage	FT%	Free throw percentage
RPG	Rebounds per game	APG	Assists per game	SPG	Steals per game
BPG	Blocks per game	PPG	Points per game	**Bold**	Career high

=== NBA ===
==== Regular season ====
Year	Team	GP	GS	MPG	FG%	3P%	FT%	RPG	APG	SPG	BPG	PPG
1994–95	Denver	3	0	4.3	.167	.000	**1.000**	.7	.3	**1.0**	.0	2.0
1995–96	Houston	63	**27**	20.2	.415	**.424**	.864	2.3	**2.7**	.4	**.1**	6.9
1996–97	Atlanta	**71**	4	17.0	.423	.414	.879	1.6	1.3	.5	**.1**	5.7
1997–98	Atlanta	59	14	**24.6**	**.456**	.419	.937	**2.4**	2.0	.7	.0	**9.3**
1998–99	Charlotte	44	2	16.1	.446	.400	.872	1.8	2.1	.4	.0	5.0
1999–00	Charlotte	7	0	4.0	.429	.250	–	.6	.7	.0	.0	1.0
2000–01	Charlotte	43	0	9.4	.333	.333	.778	1.2	.9	.1	.0	2.4
2001–02	Charlotte	1	0	2.0	–	–	–	.0	.0	.0	.0	.0
2001–02	L.A. Clippers	5	0	6.2	.333	.000	**1.000**	.0	1.0	.2	.0	1.0
Career		296	47	17.3	.426	.409	.887	1.8	1.8	.4	.0	5.9

==== Playoffs ====
Year	Team	GP	GS	MPG	FG%	3P%	FT%	RPG	APG	SPG	BPG	PPG
1996	Houston	1	0	8.0	.000	.000	–	1.0	**2.0**	.0	.0	.0
1997	Atlanta	**10**	0	12.1	**.423**	.364	.625	**1.1**	.9	.2	.0	3.1
1998	Atlanta	4	0	**22.3**	.400	**.583**	**1.000**	1.0	**2.0**	**.5**	.0	**7.3**
2001	Charlotte	2	0	4.5	.000	–	.750	.5	1.0	.0	.0	1.5
Career		17	0	13.4	.382	.458	.714	1.0	1.2	.2	.0	3.7
