= Sankofa Community Development Corporation =

The Sankofa Community Development Corporation is a community organization with the mission of supporting revitalization of the Lower Ninth Ward neighborhood of New Orleans.

== History ==
The organization was founded by artist Rashida Ferdinand in 2008.

== Projects ==
Starting in 2008, the organization runs a produce stand, to address food justice concerns for the community. In 2024, the stand obtained a long-term space for produce distribution and nutrition-related programming as the Sankofa Fresh Start market.

The organization also runs various classes, including STEM and climate-related programming for kids, and nutrition classes offered through a partnership with Xavier University of Louisiana.

In 2014, the organization began work on the Sankofa Wetlands and Nature Preserve, which would restore 40 acres of native wetlands along Florida Avenue.
