= Florida Canal =

Coordinates: 29°57′55″N 89°58′31″W

The Florida Canal or 40 Arpent Canal is a canal in the New Orleans metropolitan area and land down river.

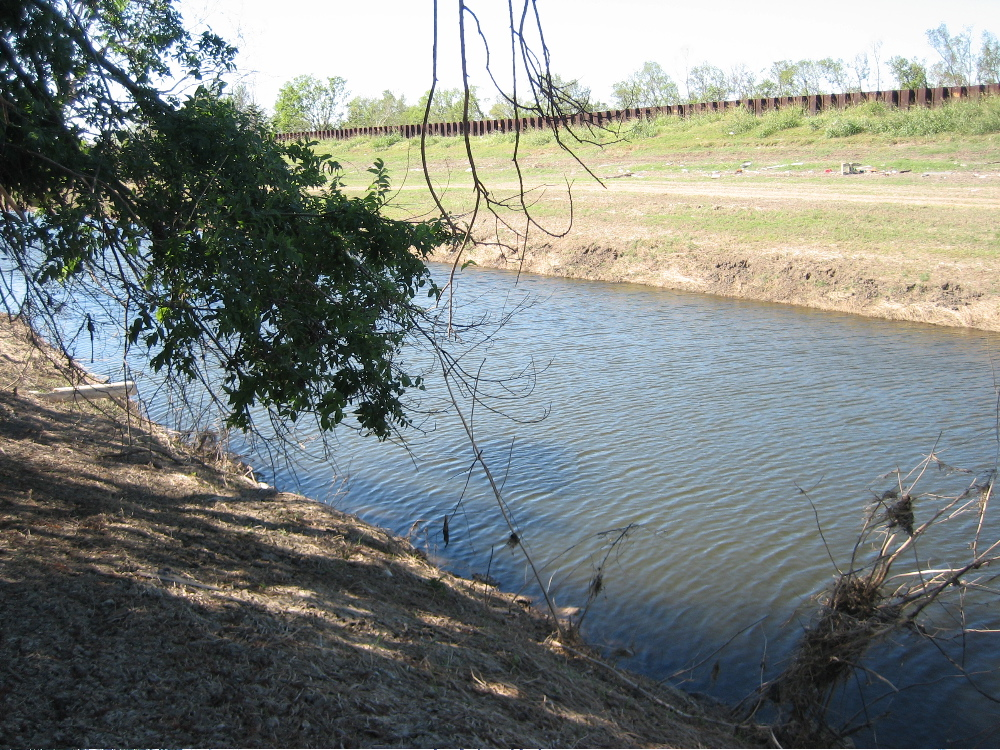
A portion of the Florida Canal in back of Arabi. On the back side of the canal the levee and floodwall can be seen.

The canal was built in the 18th century colonial era of Louisiana, stretching from what is now the Faubourg Marigny neighborhood of New Orleans, roughly paralleling the Mississippi River on the East Bank down through modern Saint Bernard Parish and part of the East Bank of Plaquemines. Colonial land grants commonly stretched 40 arpents back from the Mississippi River. The canal thus marked the back end of properties, mostly originally plantations. In this area this line happened to generally be about the limit of land useful for cultivation where the higher land of the natural river levee ended in swamp. The "40 Arpent Canal" was used by small vessels for commerce between nearby plantations; larger vessels and longer range shipping used the Mississippi. The earth moved to dig the canal was used to create a raised roadway on the river side of the canal, called the "Florida Walk".

With development and the construction of additional perpendicular canals in the 19th and 20th century, the old 40 Arpent Canal was divided into several discontinuous canals. Florida Walk became Florida Avenue, although discontinued in some areas either by being developed over or being allowed to fall back into wilderness. In some places such as New Orleans the remaining pieces of the canal became known as the "Florida Canal", while in parts of Saint Bernard and Plaquemines the old "40 Arpent Canal" name is still used. No longer used for shipping, the canal is still used for drainage, and in places some small pleasure and fishing boats.

Down river from the Industrial Canal, the Florida Canal still marks the inland boundary of the Lower 9th Ward neighborhood of New Orleans and communities such as Arabi and Chalmette.

Levees and floodwalls constructed on the back side of the canal help protect settled areas from flooding. These levees in back of the canal were overtopped by storm surges during Hurricane Katrina in 2005; to do this the storm surge needed to first top the larger levees abutting the MR-GO and travel through the wetlands between MR-GO and the 40 Arpent Canal back levee. In December 2005 it was announced that in Saint Bernard Parish the 40 Arpent Canal back levee would be increased in height to help offer some temporary protection until more comprehensive work could be done on MR-GO.
