= Sankofa Television =

Ghanaian television station

Sankofa Television, a subsidiary of Sankofa Media Group LLC, is based in Ghana.

Sankofa TV serves African migrant audiences and other nationals interested in African affairs. Established in 2001, it is the largest Sub-Saharan TV station in Europe for Africans. The channel broadcast from Amsterdam to 1.5 million households in the city and its vicinity using SALTO, a local channel, to broadcast its programmes. As of 2004, the channel was being managed by a team of 28 volunteers and planned to launch a 24/7 web stream, with assistance from an IT school in Breda.
