= Robert Pack (basketball) =

American basketball coach (born 1969)

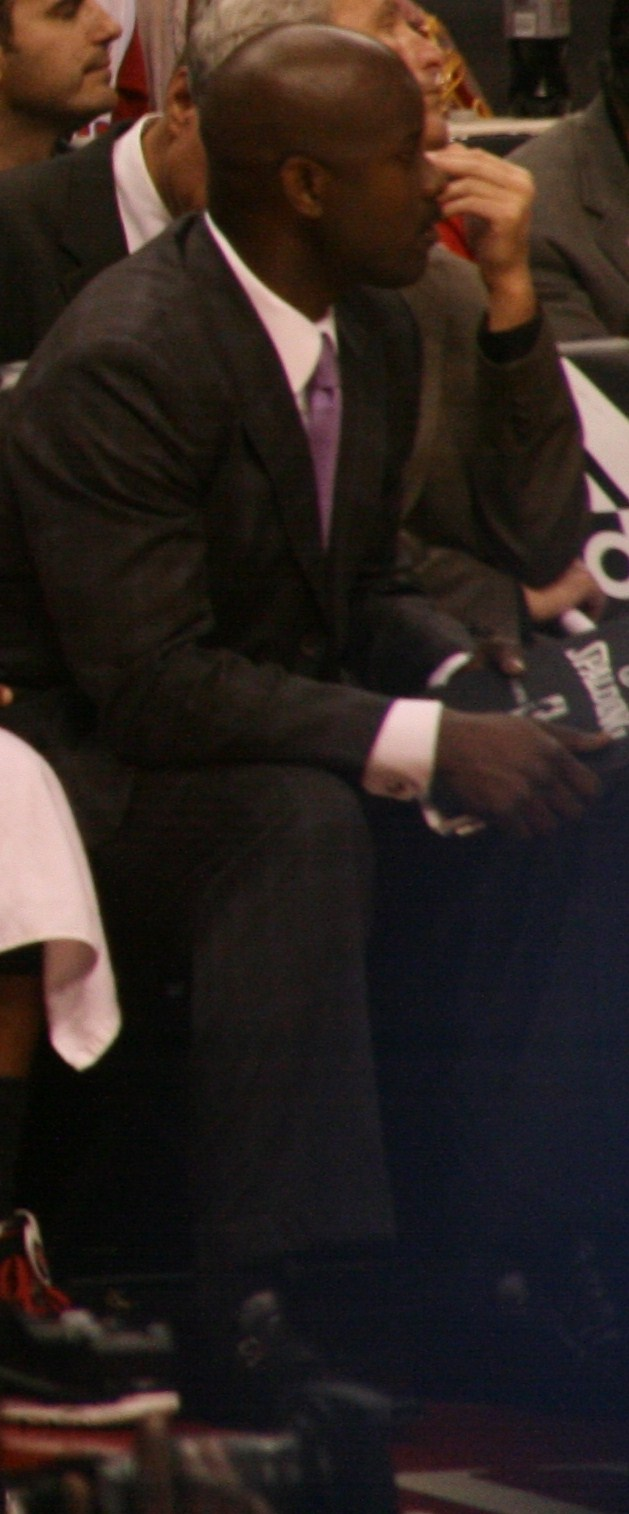
- Pack in 2011 as an assistant coach for the Los Angeles Clippers

Personal information
- Born: February 3, 1969 (age 57) New Orleans, Louisiana, U.S.
- Listed height: 6 ft 2 in (1.88 m)
- Listed weight: 180 lb (82 kg)

Career information
- High school: Alfred Lawless (New Orleans, Louisiana)
- College: Tyler JC (1987–1989); USC (1989–1991)
- NBA draft: 1991: undrafted
- Playing career: 1991–2005
- Position: Point guard / shooting guard
- Number: 14, 12, 9
- Coaching career: 2009–2022

Career history

Playing
- 1991–1992: Portland Trail Blazers
- 1992–1995: Denver Nuggets
- 1995–1996: Washington Bullets
- 1996–1997: New Jersey Nets
- 1997–2000: Dallas Mavericks
- 2000–2001: Denver Nuggets
- 2002: Minnesota Timberwolves
- 2003: New Orleans Hornets
- 2004: New Jersey Nets
- 2003–2004: Valencia
- 2004–2005: Žalgiris Kaunas

Coaching
- 2009–2010: New Orleans Hornets (assistant)
- 2010–2013: Los Angeles Clippers (assistant)
- 2013–2015: Oklahoma City Thunder (assistant)
- 2015–2018: New Orleans Pelicans (assistant)
- 2018–2021: Washington Wizards (assistant)
- 2022: REG

Career highlights
- Lithuanian League champion (2005)
- Stats at NBA.com
- Stats at Basketball Reference

Robert John Pack Jr. (born February 3, 1969) is an American professional basketball coach and former player. He last coached the Rwandan club REG of the Basketball Africa League A 6 ft 2 in (1.88 m) point guard, he played 13 seasons in the National Basketball Association (NBA).

== High school and college career ==
Pack attended Alfred Lawless High School in New Orleans. He was a high school teammate of future NBA player Eldridge Recasner and graduated from Lawless in 1987. He then attended Tyler Junior College for two years, transferred to the University of Southern California in 1989, and graduated with a degree in sociology in 1991. He averaged 13.4 points per game and 5.3 assists in his two seasons at USC.

== Professional career ==
=== Early career ===
Pack was not drafted by an NBA team, rather he began his career by being signed as a free agent by the Portland Trail Blazers on September 16, 1991. He made the team by beating out veteran Walter Davis and played 72 games for the Blazers as a rookie, averaging 4.6 points/game in 12.4 MPG as he was entrenched behind veterans Terry Porter and Danny Ainge. The Blazers went to the NBA Finals that year, before losing the series, 4–2, to the Chicago Bulls. During the 1992 off-season, after the Blazers signed free agent point guard Rod Strickland, Pack was traded to the Nuggets for a 1993 second-round draft pick.

=== Mid-career ===
Pack spent three seasons with the Nuggets from 1992–93 until 1994–95, with his minutes and games started increasing each season. On March 18, 1993, Pack set a then-career-high with 27 points while coming off the bench in a 105–101 loss to the Boston Celtics. He was part of a young Nuggets team starring Dikembe Mutombo, LaPhonso Ellis and Mahmoud Abdul-Rauf that became the first eighth-seeded team in NBA history to defeat the first-seeded team as the Nuggets defeated the Seattle SuperSonics in the first round of the 1994 Western Conference Playoffs. Pack was then traded to the Washington Bullets for Doug Overton and Don MacLean on October 30, 1995. Injuries slowed Pack during the prime years of his career, as he never played a full 82-game season. In 31 games for the Bullets, Pack averaged 18.1 ppg, 7.8 apg, 4.3 rpg and 2.00 spg in what was his best season statistically. Prior to the 1996–97 season he was signed by the New Jersey Nets before being traded mid-season to the Dallas Mavericks along with Shawn Bradley, Ed O'Bannon and Khalid Reeves for Sam Cassell, Chris Gatling, Jim Jackson, George McCloud and Eric Montross. Pack remained with the Mavericks through the end of the 1999–00 season, never playing more than the 54 games he played in 1996–97 as injuries slowed his career.

=== Late career ===
Pack returned to the Nuggets for the 2000–01 season after being traded by the Mavericks via the Boston Celtics. He played 74 games that season, starting 11 of them as a replacement for starting point guard Nick Van Exel. The Minnesota Timberwolves signed him in the off-season and he played 16 games for them in 2001–02. His final two seasons in the NBA were as a veteran backup point guard off the bench for the New Orleans Hornets (2002–03) and the New Jersey Nets (2003–04). On October 2, 2005, Pack signed a contract with the Toronto Raptors for a tryout with the team. His stint with the Raptors was short-lived as he was cut by the team on October 22.

He finished his NBA career and from 2004 to 2005 he played in Žalgiris Kaunas in Lithuania.

== Coaching career ==
In August 2009, Pack joined the New Orleans Hornets as an assistant coach. He became an assistant coach for the Los Angeles Clippers the next season. On July 31, 2013, he became an assistant coach for the Oklahoma City Thunder.

On June 22, 2015, he returned to the now New Orleans Pelicans as an assistant coach.

On October 10, 2018, Pack joined the Washington Wizards as assistant coach.

On February 18, 2022, Pack was announced as the new head coach of the Rwandan club REG ahead of the Basketball Africa League (BAL).

== Other ==
Pack was known as one of the game's better dunkers during the first half of the 1990s and one of the more spectacular in-game dunkers of all-time among smaller players, due largely to his outstanding vertical leap and lateral quickness. He finished second in the 1994 NBA Slam Dunk Contest during the NBA All-Star Weekend in Minneapolis, Minnesota, behind Isaiah Rider.

He achieved two triple-doubles in his career.

=== Philanthropy ===
In November 2016, Pack and Percy "Master P" Miller formed Team H.O.P.E. NOLA, an acronym for “Helping Our Players Excel.” Its players were twenty at-risk males between the ages of 12–15 and chosen from New Orleans-area schools.

== Career statistics ==
Legend
GP	Games played	GS	Games started	MPG	Minutes per game
FG%	Field goal percentage	3P%	3-point field goal percentage	FT%	Free throw percentage
RPG	Rebounds per game	APG	Assists per game	SPG	Steals per game
BPG	Blocks per game	PPG	Points per game	**Bold**	Career high

=== NBA ===
==== Regular season ====
Year	Team	GP	GS	MPG	FG%	3P%	FT%	RPG	APG	SPG	BPG	PPG
1991–92	Portland	72	0	12.4	.423	.000	.803	1.3	1.9	.6	.1	4.6
1992–93	Denver	**77**	1	20.5	**.470**	.125	.768	2.1	4.4	1.1	.1	10.5
1993–94	Denver	66	4	20.9	.443	.207	.758	1.9	5.4	1.2	.1	9.6
1994–95	Denver	42	**32**	27.2	.430	.417	.783	2.7	6.9	1.5	.1	12.1
1995–96	Washington	31	31	**35.0**	.428	.265	.846	**4.3**	7.8	**2.0**	.0	**18.1**
1996–97	New Jersey	34	31	34.9	.407	.297	.788	2.5	**9.6**	1.7	.1	15.9
1996–97	Dallas	20	11	29.9	.361	.237	**.849**	3.0	6.4	1.8	**.2**	11.5
1997–98	Dallas	12	10	24.3	.337	**.500**	.694	2.8	3.5	1.7	.1	7.8
1998–99	Dallas	25	0	18.7	.431	.000	.818	1.4	3.2	.8	.0	8.9
1999–00	Dallas	29	22	22.9	.417	.364	.808	1.4	5.8	1.1	.1	8.9
2000–01	Denver	74	11	17.0	.425	.387	.766	1.9	4.0	.9	.0	6.5
2001–02	Minnesota	16	0	15.8	.368	.250	.733	1.4	3.1	.8	.0	3.9
2002–03	New Orleans	28	4	15.7	.403	.000	.745	1.8	2.9	.9	.0	5.2
2003–04	New Jersey	26	0	8.5	.423	.000	.833	.7	1.0	.5	.0	1.9
Career		552	157	20.8	.425	.292	.787	2.0	4.6	1.1	.1	8.9

==== Playoffs ====
Year	Team	GP	GS	MPG	FG%	3P%	FT%	RPG	APG	SPG	BPG	PPG
1992	Portland	**14**	0	3.7	.222	–	.750	.4	.5	.4	.1	.8
1994	Denver	12	0	**27.7**	.407	**.300**	.709	**2.3**	**4.3**	**1.5**	**.5**	**11.8**
2002	Minnesota	3	0	3.3	.200	.000	**1.000**	.0	.0	.0	.0	1.0
2003	New Orleans	4	0	10.5	**.462**	–	**1.000**	.3	1.0	.0	.0	3.8
Career		33	0	13.2	.383	.286	.730	1.1	1.9	.7	.2	5.2

== Head coaching record ==
=== BAL ===
Legend
Regular season	G	Games coached	W	Games won	L	Games lost	W–L %	Win–loss %
Playoffs	PG	Playoff games	PW	Playoff wins	PL	Playoff losses	PW–L %	Playoff win–loss %

Team	Year	G	W	L	W–L%	Finish	PG	PW	PL	PW–L%	Result
REG	2022	5	4	1	.800	1st in Sahara Conference	1	0	1	.000	Lost in Quarterfinals

== See also ==
- List of National Basketball Association players with most assists in a game
