= National Register of Historic Places listings in St. Bernard Parish, Louisiana =

Location of St. Bernard Parish in Louisiana

This is a list of the National Register of Historic Places listings in St. Bernard Parish, Louisiana.

This is intended to be a complete list of the properties on the National Register of Historic Places in St. Bernard Parish, Louisiana, United States. The locations of National Register properties for which the latitude and longitude coordinates are included below, may be seen in a map.

There are 12 properties listed on the National Register in the parish.

This National Park Service list is complete through NPS recent listings posted December 12, 2025.

== Current listings ==
	Name on the Register	Image	Date listed	Location	City or town	Description
1	1939 St. Bernard Parish Courthouse	1939 St. Bernard Parish Courthouse	January 31, 2019 (#100003376)	1101 W. St. Bernard Hwy. 29°56′24″N 89°58′27″W	Chalmette	
2	Chalmette Unit of Jean Lafitte National Historical Park	Chalmette Unit of Jean Lafitte National Historical Park	October 15, 1966 (#66000889)	6 miles (9.7 km) south of New Orleans; 29°56′31″N 89°59′26″W	Chalmette	Site of the 1815 Battle of New Orleans; park includes monument, visitor center, and national cemetery.
3	Chandeleur Light	Chandeleur Light	June 25, 1986 (#86001404)	Breton National Wildlife Refuge; 30°02′52″N 88°52′18″W	Chandeleur Islands, Gulf of Mexico	Lighthouse dating from 1848, destroyed by Hurricane Katrina in 2005.
4	Dr. Louis A. Ducros House	Dr. Louis A. Ducros House	June 9, 2014 (#14000315)	1345 Bayou Ave. 29°52′05″N 89°51′37″W	St. Bernard	part of the Los Isleños Museum Complex
5	Ford Motor Company Assembly Plant	Ford Motor Company Assembly Plant	June 22, 2018 (#100002589)	7200 N Peters St. 29°56′47″N 90°00′17″W	Arabi	Former Ford Motor Company plant, 1923-1933
6	Fort Proctor	Fort Proctor	September 20, 1978 (#78003067)	North of Shell Beach on Lake Borgne; 29°52′02″N 89°40′42″W	Shell Beach	Ruins of a mid-19th century fortification intended for the defense of New Orleans; built on the land adjacent to Lake Borgne, it has been surrounded by water since the mid-20th century.
7	Friscoville Street Historic District	Friscoville Street Historic District	July 9, 1998 (#98000837)	100-900 blocks of Friscoville St. 29°57′01″N 90°00′04″W	Arabi	
8	Kenilworth Plantation House	Kenilworth Plantation House	April 24, 2006 (#06000317)	2931 Bayou Rd. 29°52′02″N 89°48′51″W	Kenilworth, near St. Bernard	Circa-1820 antebellum plantation home; built in the French Creole architectural style, it is one of the few remaining and best-preserved examples.
9	Magnolia Mound		May 22, 1978 (#78003068)	Address Restricted	uninhabited area	Pre-historic Native American construction
10	Old Arabi Historic District	Old Arabi Historic District	July 9, 1998 (#98000836)	Roughly along parts of Angela, Mehle, and Esteban Sts. 29°57′06″N 90°00′28″W	Arabi	Older section of Arabi, Louisiana, mostly residential with some small commercial structures
11	Pecan Grove Plantation House	Pecan Grove Plantation House	March 20, 2013 (#13000094)	10 Pecan Grove Ln. 29°55′44″N 89°55′41″W	Meraux	
12	Sebastopol Plantation House	Sebastopol Plantation House	August 13, 1986 (#86001495)	Louisiana Highway 46; 29°52′04″N 89°52′21″W	Sebastapol, between Poydras and St. Bernard	

== See also ==
- List of National Historic Landmarks in Louisiana
- National Register of Historic Places listings in Louisiana
