= Nate Thomas =

American football player (born 2001)

Nathan Thomas
No. 78 – Houston Texans
- Position: Offensive tackle
- Roster status: Active

Personal information
- Born: August 22, 2001 (age 25); New Orleans, Louisiana, U.S.
- Listed height: 6 ft 5 in (1.96 m)
- Listed weight: 330 lb (150 kg)

Career information
- High school: Chalmette (Chalmette, Louisiana)
- College: Louisiana (2019–2023)
- NFL draft: 2024: 7th round, 233rd overall pick

Career history
- Dallas Cowboys (2024–2025); Houston Texans (2026–present)

Career NFL statistics as of 2025
- Games played: 17
- Games started: 4
- Stats at Pro Football Reference

Nathan Thomas (born August 22, 2001) is an American professional football offensive tackle for the Houston Texans of the National Football League (NFL). He played college football for the Louisiana Ragin' Cajuns and was selected by the Dallas Cowboys in the seventh round of the 2024 NFL draft.

== Early life ==
Thomas was born on August 22, 2001, in New Orleans, Louisiana, and grew up there. He first played football at age 11, having previously played basketball.

Thomas attended Chalmette High School in Chalmette, Louisiana, where he played football and basketball. He played three years of football as a tight end, helping the Owls reach the state playoffs twice.

A three-star recruit, he committed to play college football for the Louisiana Rajin' Cajuns as an offensive tackle.

== College career ==
Thomas redshirted in 2019 while appearing in one game, and then saw no playing time during the 2020 season.

After playing seven games as a backup in 2021, he won the starting left tackle job for the Ragin' Cajuns in 2022.

Thomas ultimately started all 13 games for the team during the 2022 season.

He returned for the 2023 season and was named honorable mention All-Sun Belt Conference while starting all 12 regular season games. He ended his collegiate career with 32 games played, 25 as a starter, and received invites to the East–West Shrine Bowl and NFL Scouting Combine.

== Professional career ==
Pre-draft measurables
Height	Weight	Arm length	Hand span	Wingspan	40-yard dash	10-yard split	20-yard split	20-yard shuttle	Three-cone drill	Vertical jump	Broad jump	Bench press
6 ft 5 in (1.96 m)	332 lb (151 kg)	33 3/4 in (0.86 m)	10 3/4 in (0.27 m)	6 ft 11 in (2.11 m)	5.19 s	1.76 s	2.98 s	4.65 s	8.01 s	25.0 in (0.64 m)	8 ft 11 in (2.72 m)	24 reps
All values from NFL Scouting Combine/Pro Day

=== Dallas Cowboys ===
Thomas was selected in the seventh round (233rd overall) of the 2024 NFL draft by the Dallas Cowboys. He was placed on injured reserve on August 27, 2024.

In 2026, although he was given the chance to compete for the starting left tackle position with Tyler Guyton, it was reported in the media that Thomas play had regressed and that Guyton had pulled away early in training camp as the clear leader. On August 29, the Cowboys ended up being compelled to trade for Broderick Jones in order to improve the offensive tackle depth.

=== Houston Texans ===
On August 30, 2026, Thomas was traded to the Houston Texans in exchange for a 2027 seventh-round pick.
