= St. Bernard Voice =

Weekly newspaper in St. Bernard Parish, Louisiana

- Type: Weekly newspaper
- Founded: 1890
- Headquarters: 1515 E. Judge Perez, Chalmette, LA 70043
- Circulation: 3,000
- Website: thestbernardvoice.com

The St. Bernard Voice is a weekly newspaper in St. Bernard Parish, Louisiana.

== History ==
Founded by William F. Roy on January 11, 1890, the St. Bernard Voice has been published weekly since. Roy was the owner, publisher and editor. He also was a reporter and even published the paper as a pressman. When Roy died on January 1, 1948, he was still the sole editorial writer and pressman using the old process of setting type by hand. Upon his father's death, Edwin M. Roy followed in his father's footsteps by remaining to write and publish The Voice.

The Voice was finally updated to offset presses in November 1964. At some point in time, The Voice was scaled down to a tabloid. It was switched back to a full-size, eight column paper in August 1972.

Keeping with a family tradition, Edwin Main Roy turned over the St. Bernard Voice a mere three weeks before his death on May 31, 1975, to his son, Edwin Main Roy Jr., who has also remained as the editor and publisher.

Even though St. Bernard Parish sustained extensive damage during Hurricane Katrina, the building that houses The Voice office in Arabi, Louisiana, which is considered one of the oldest structures in St. Bernard Parish, survived the wind and water damage.

In 2020, the newspaper moved from the historic building in Arabi to Chalmette, Louisiana.
