= St. Bernard's =

St. Bernard's can refer to:

- St. Bernard's, Newfoundland and Labrador, Canada.
- St. Bernard's College, Lower Hutt, New Zealand.
- St. Bernard's College, Melbourne, Australia.
- St. Bernard's College, Oxford, England, a former Cistercian house of study out of which St John's College, Oxford, developed.
- St Bernard's Hospital, Hanwell, a psychiatric hospital in Southall, Middlesex, United Kingdom, situated on the site of the old Hanwell Asylum.
- St. Bernard's School (disambiguation), multiple schools
- St Bernard's F.C. former Scottish football club.

== See also ==
- Saint Bernard (disambiguation)
