= St. Bernard's School (disambiguation) =

"St. Bernard's School", and variants is a frequently used school name, or part of a school name, after the 10th Century French Catholic abbot and reformer Saint Bernard may refer to:

== United Kingdom ==
- St Bernard's High School, Westcliff-on-Sea, Essex, England
- St Bernard's Catholic High School, Furness, Cumbria, England
- St Bernard's Catholic High School, Rotherham, South Yorkshire, England
- St Michael's Catholic School (formerly known as St Augustine and St Bernard's Catholic School), High Wycombe, Buckinghamshire, England
- St Bernard's Catholic Grammar School, Slough, Berkshire, England
- St Bernard's Catholic School, Buckinghamshire, now St Michael's Catholic School, High Wycombe, Buckinghamshire, United Kingdom

== United States ==
- St. Bernard's School, Manhattan, New York
- St. Bernard Preparatory School, Cullman, Alabama
- St. Bernard's High School (Eureka, California), Eureka, California
- St. Bernard High School (Los Angeles, California), Los Angeles, California
- Saint Bernard School, Uncasville, Connecticut
- St. Bernard High School (St. Bernard Parish, Louisiana), a former school in the St. Bernard Parish Public Schools district
- St. Bernard Unified School, St. Bernard Parish, Louisiana
- St. Bernard's High School (Fitchburg, Massachusetts), Fitchburg, Massachusetts
- Saint Bernard's High School (Saint Paul, Minnesota), Saint Paul, Minnesota
- St. Bernard-Elmwood Place High School, St. Bernard, Ohio

== Canada ==
- St. Bernard's School (Brantford), Ontario

== Zimbabwe ==
- St. Bernard's High School (Bulawayo, Zimbabwe), Bulawayo, Zimbabwe
