= Friscoville Street Historic District =

- U.S. National Register of Historic Places
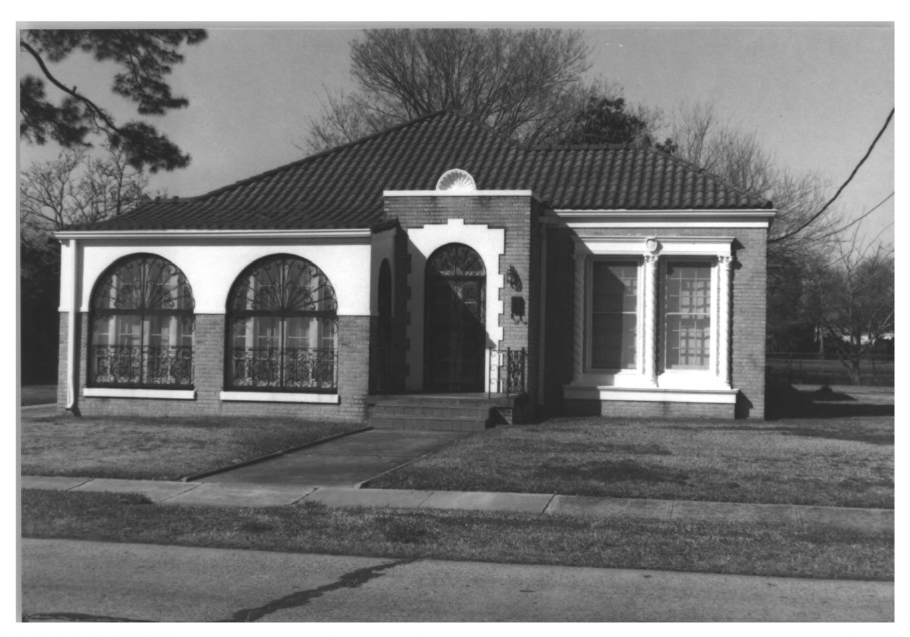

- Location within Louisiana
- Location: 100-900 blocks of Friscoville St., Arabi, Louisiana
- Coordinates: 29°57′01″N 90°00′04″W
- Area: 16 acres (6.5 ha)
- Built: 1906
- Architectural style: Colonial Revival, Bungalow/craftsman
- NRHP reference No.: 98000837
- Added to NRHP: July 9, 1998

The Friscoville Street Historic District, in Arabi, Louisiana in St. Bernard Parish, Louisiana, is a 16 acres (6.5 ha) historic district which was listed on the National Register of Historic Places in 1998. It included 76 contributing buildings.

It includes the 100-900 blocks of Friscoville Street, which was platted in 1906. The district is mostly residential. Besides houses, there are a church, a historic jail, a small commercial building, a brick school, and former casino. It includes Colonial Revival and Bungalow architecture plus scattered eclectic houses.
