= St. Bernard Unified School =

St. Bernard Unified School (SBUS)

Location
- 1100 E Judge Perez Dr; Chalmette, Louisiana; United States
- Coordinates: 29.9375°N 89.9531°W

Information
- Type: Public
- Established: November 2005
- Closed: Spring 2006
- Grades: Pre-K–12

The St. Bernard Unified School was the K-12 public school in St. Bernard Parish, Louisiana, United States, for the 2005-2006 school year after Hurricane Katrina hit the Parish directly on August 29, 2005. The school opened in mid-November 2005, less than three months after the devastating floods hit the parish, becoming the first school to open in the flood zone. The school was disbanded after spring 2006. The school was operated by St. Bernard Parish Public Schools.

After Hurricane Katrina left the entire parish and all of its schools devastated, the St. Bernard Parish School Board led by Doris Voitier created the school at the site of former Chalmette High School. The quick response made it possible for many residents to return and begin rebuilding their homes without having to send their children away to school. Because of the great number of students, some classrooms were within the school building and some were in trailers set up in the parking lot of Bobby Nuss Stadium.

The school was attended by the students of the previous public schools:

- Andrew Jackson Fundamental Magnet High School
- Arabi Elementary School
- Chalmette High School
- Chalmette Middle School
- J.F. Gauthier Elementary School
- Joseph Davies Elementary School
- Lacoste Elementary School
- P.G.T. Beauregard Middle School
- NOVA Academy
- Rowley Elementary School
- Trist Middle School
- Sebastian Roy Elementary School
- St. Bernard High School
- W. Smith Elementary School

The school was also attended by a minority of students from private Catholic Pre-K–8 schools in the surrounding Chalmette/Arabi area:

- Our Lady of Prompt Succor School
- St. Mark School (Lacoste Elementary School c. Fall 2012)
- St. Louise de Marillac School (closed)
- St. Robert Bellarmine School (closed)

In August 2006, the St. Bernard Parish School Board re-opened Chalmette High School under its own name, with students from grades 7–12; and Andrew Jackson Magnet High School was re-opened as an elementary school for grades K–6 as well as pre-school classes.
