= Meraux, Louisiana =

Meraux
- Census-designated place
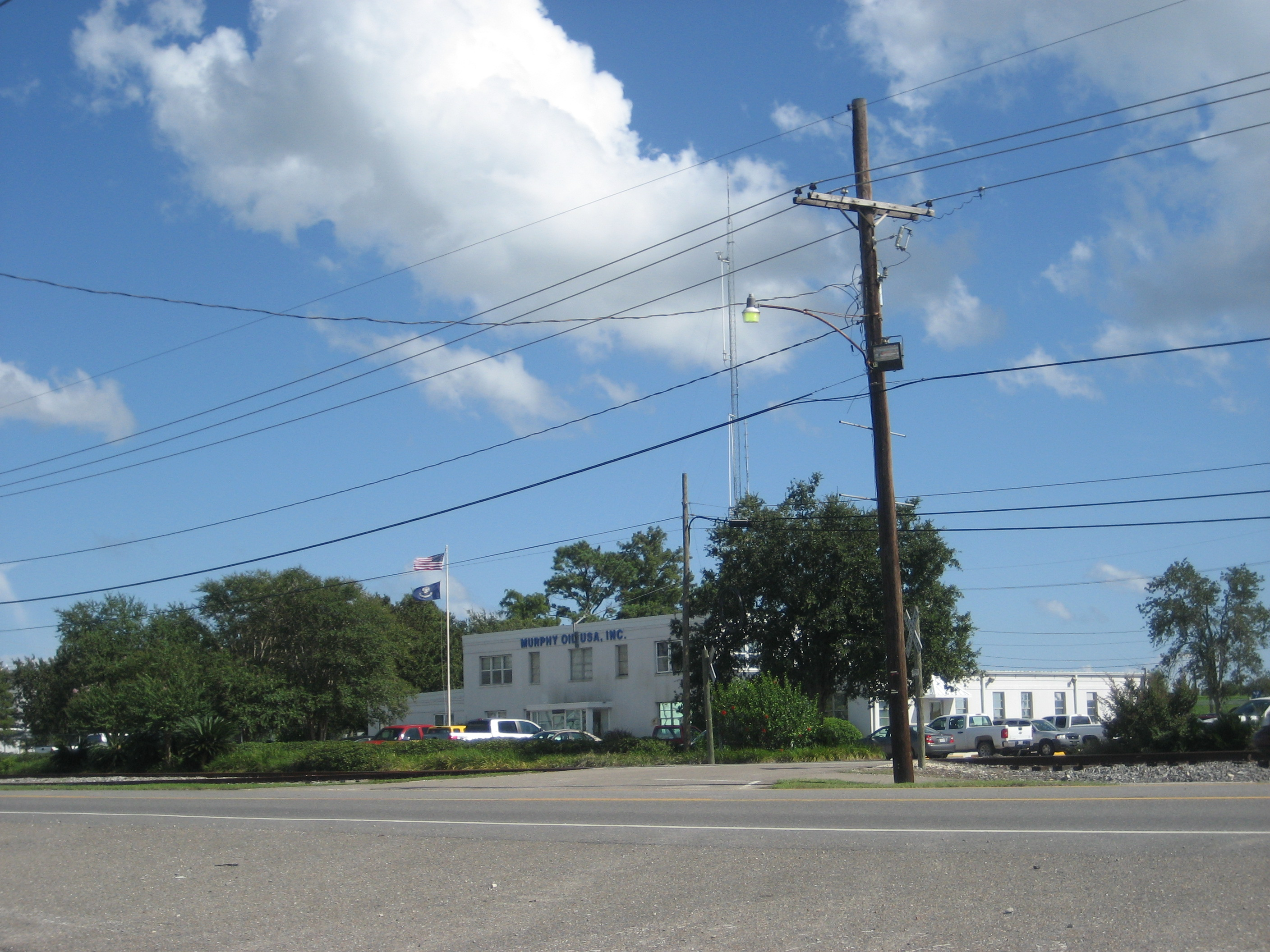
- Murphy Oil office in Meraux

- Location in St. Bernard Parish and the state of Louisiana.
- Coordinates: 29°55′39″N 89°55′07″W
- Country: United States
- State: Louisiana
- Parish: St. Bernard

Area
  - Total: 4.81 sq mi (12.46 km^{2})
  - Land: 4.15 sq mi (10.74 km^{2})
  - Water: 0.66 sq mi (1.72 km^{2})
- Elevation: 7 ft (2.1 m)

Population (2020)
  - Total: 6,804
  - Density: 1,640.3/sq mi (633.33/km^{2})
- Time zone: UTC-6 (CST)
  - Summer (DST): UTC-5 (CDT)
- ZIP code: 70075
- Area code: 504
- FIPS code: 22-49800

Meraux is a census-designated place (CDP) in St. Bernard Parish, Louisiana, United States. The population was 6,804 in 2020. It is part of the New Orleans–Metairie metropolitan statistical area.

== History ==
In 2005, the town was devastated by storm surge and wind associated with Hurricane Katrina which destroyed the Mississippi River-Gulf Outlet Canal (MRGO) levee.

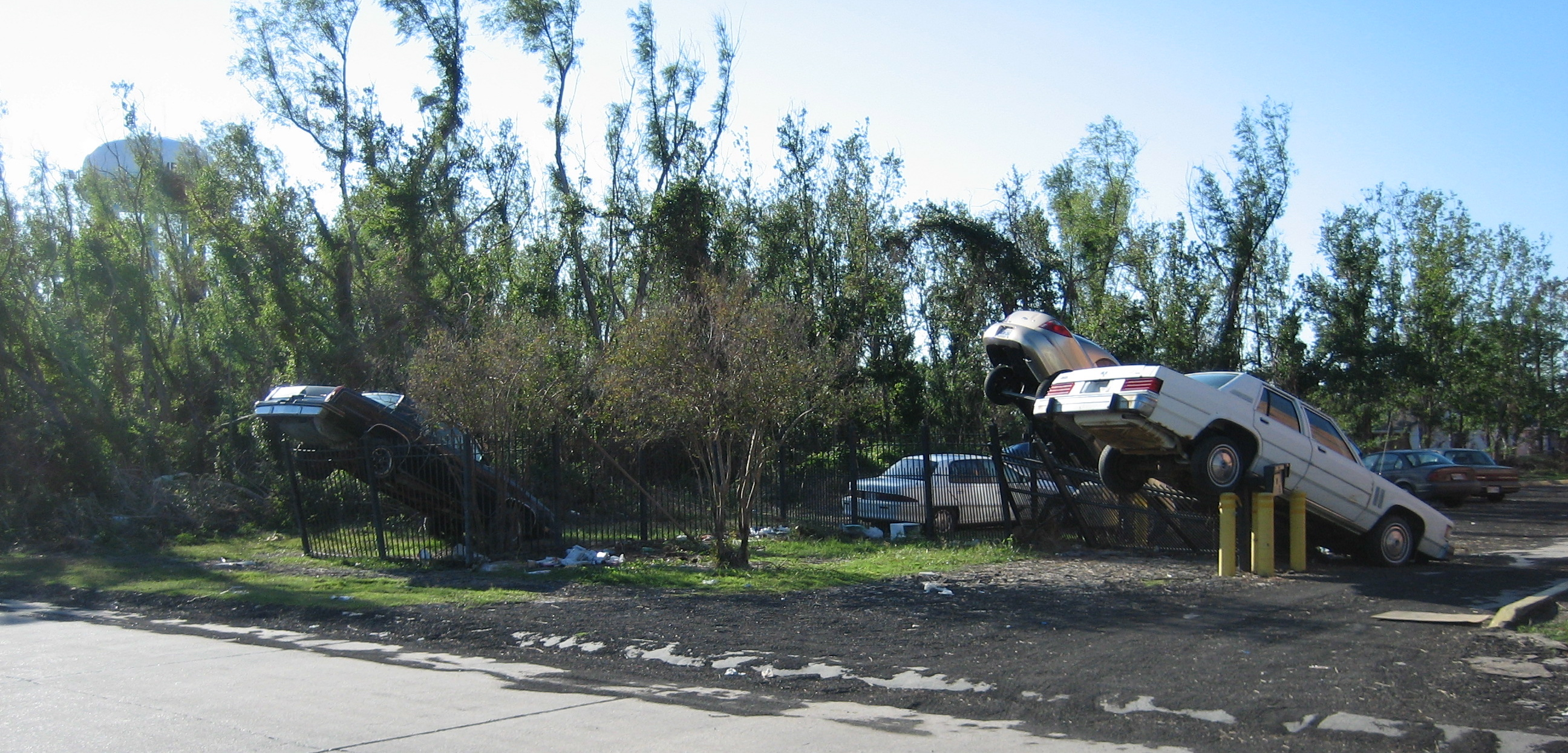
Cars tossed by Katrina storm surge, Archbishop Hannan Avenue, Meraux

== Geography ==
Meraux is located at 29°55′39″N 89°55′7″W (29.927561, -89.918508). According to the United States Census Bureau, the CDP has a total area of 4.8 square miles (12.4 km^{2}), of which 4.2 square miles (10.8 km^{2}) is land and 0.6 square mile (1.6 km^{2}) (12.94%) is water.

== Demographics ==
Historical population
Census	Pop.	Note	%±
1990	8,849		—
2000	10,192		15.2%
2010	5,816		−42.9%
2020	6,804		17.0%
U.S. Decennial Census; 1950 1960 1970 1980; 1990 2000 2010

Meraux first appeared as census designated place in the 1980 U.S. census.

Meraux CDP, Louisiana – Racial and ethnic composition Note: the U.S. Census Bureau treats Hispanic/Latino as an ethnic category. This table excludes Latinos from the racial categories and assigns them to a separate category. Hispanics/Latinos may be of any race.
Race / Ethnicity (NH = Non-Hispanic)	Pop 2000	Pop 2010	Pop 2020	% 2000	% 2010	% 2020
White alone (NH)	9,111	4,501	4,427	89.39%	77.39%	65.06%
Black or African American alone (NH)	373	602	1,005	3.66%	10.35%	14.77%
Native American or Alaska Native alone (NH)	44	39	40	0.43%	0.67%	0.59%
Asian alone (NH)	161	100	152	1.58%	1.72%	2.23%
Native Hawaiian or Pacific Islander alone (NH)	0	2	0	0.00%	0.03%	0.00%
Other race alone (NH)	2	7	20	0.02%	0.12%	0.29%
Mixed race or Multiracial (NH)	86	104	288	0.84%	1.79%	4.23%
Hispanic or Latino (any race)	415	461	872	4.07%	7.93%	12.82%
Total	10,192	5,816	6,804	100.00%	100.00%	100.00%

In 2000, there were 10,192 people, 3,707 households, and 2,772 families residing in the CDP. The population density was 2,447.8 inhabitants per square mile (945.1/km^{2}). There were 3,793 housing units at an average density of 911.0 units per square mile (351.7 units/km^{2}). The racial makeup of the CDP was 92.71% White, 3.66% African American, 0.47% Native American, 1.63% Asian, 0.33% from other races, and 1.20% from two or more races. Hispanic or Latino of any race were 4.07% of the population. At the 2020 United States census, there were 6,804 people, 2,184 households, and 1,632 families residing in the CDP. The racial makeup was 65.06% non-Hispanic white, 14.77% Black or African American, 0.59% Native American, 2.23% Asian, 4.53% mixed or other race, and 12.82% Hispanic or Latino of any race.

== Education ==
Residents are zoned to schools in the St. Bernard Parish Public Schools.

As of 2007, Chalmette High School serves the population.
