= LeBeau Plantation =

Plantation in Louisiana

Coordinates: 29.948818°N 90.004282°W

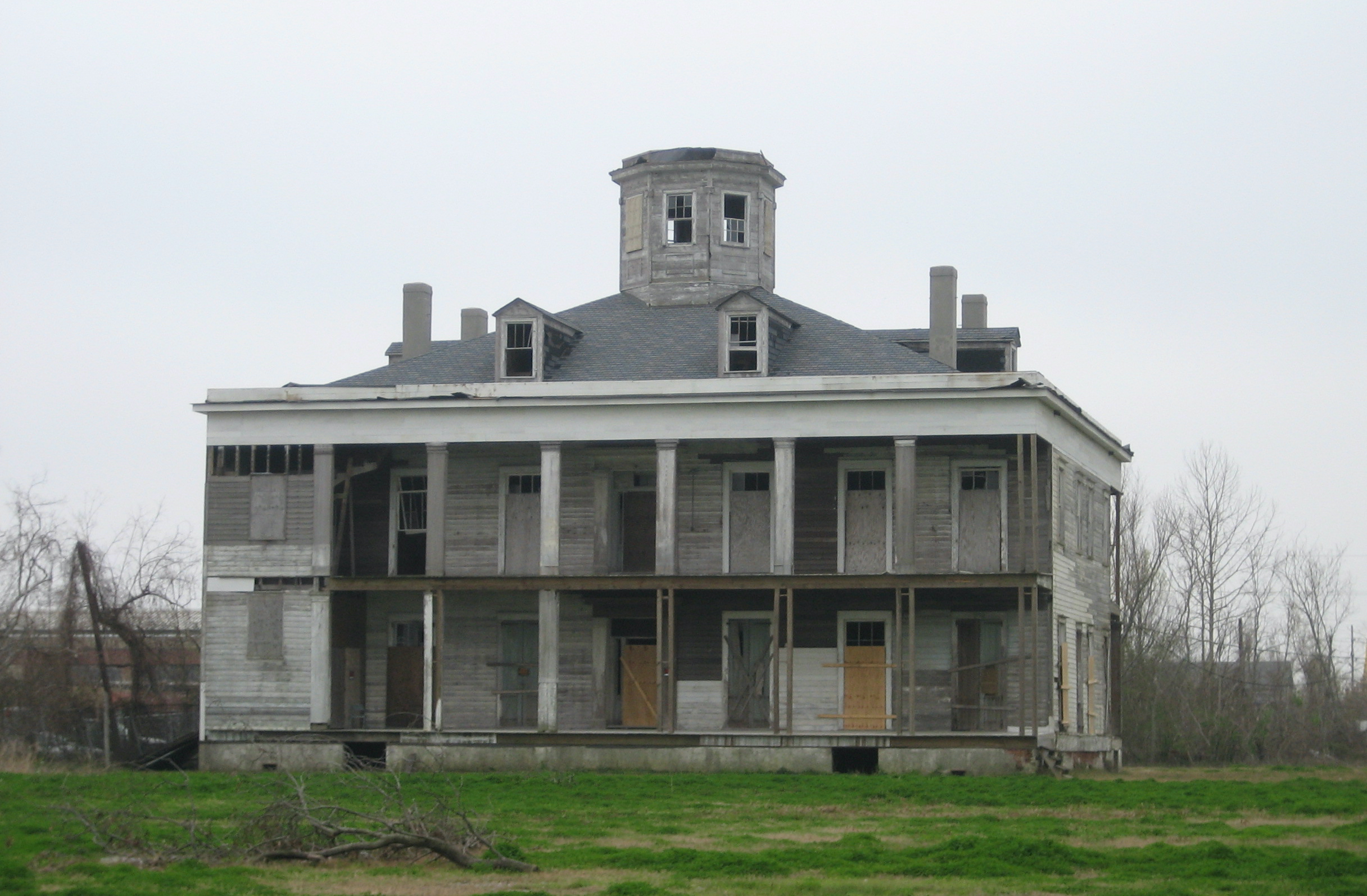
The LeBeau Plantation prior to the 2013 arson that destroyed it

The LeBeau Plantation was an historic plantation house in Arabi, Louisiana. It was located on one of the largest plantations south of New Orleans and grew indigo.

The house was built as a private residence by Francois LeBeau in 1854. LeBeau had purchased the land in 1851 and demolished the existing house. Though LeBeau died the year that the house was completed, his widow Sylvanie Fuselier lived there until her death in 1879. Between the 1920s and the 1940s, the LeBeau Plantation was known as the Cardone Hotel.

On Thursday, June 26, 1986, the LeBeau Plantation house was damaged in an act of arson.

The house nearly collapsed in 2003. It was stabilized, and then boarded up after Hurricane Katrina.

On Friday, November 22, 2013, the house was destroyed by a second act of arson. According to investigators, seven intoxicated men, ranging in age from 17 to 31, had been searching for ghosts inside the building. Aggravated by their lack of success, they decided to set fire to the house.

The first floor is made of bricks. The second floor is bousillage. The living space contains a double fireplace. Six pillars support the front gallery.

According to ghost stories, the house was haunted by a white lady, and the clocks would stop when guests were inside the house. Its design has been copied to create Halloween ghost mansions.

== See also ==
- Jean Baptiste Bergeron House

== Sources ==
- Starr, S. Frederick (April 2008). "Arabi's Forlorn Gem: The LeBeau Plantation ". Preservation in Print. p. 18-19.
