= St. Bernard Parish Public Schools =

School district in Louisiana, United States

St. Bernard Parish School District

Address
- 200 East St. Bernard Hwy Chalmette, St. Bernard Parish, Louisiana, 70043; United States

District information
- Type: School district
- Motto: VISION... EFFORT... SUCCESS!
- Superintendent: Doris Voitier
- NCES District ID: 2201410

Students and staff
- Students: 8,147 (2023-24)
- Teachers: 571.16 (FTE)
- Student–teacher ratio: 14.26

Other information
- Website: www.sbpsb.org

St. Bernard Parish Public Schools is a school district headquartered in unincorporated St. Bernard Parish, Louisiana, United States. The district operates public schools in the parish.

== Schools ==
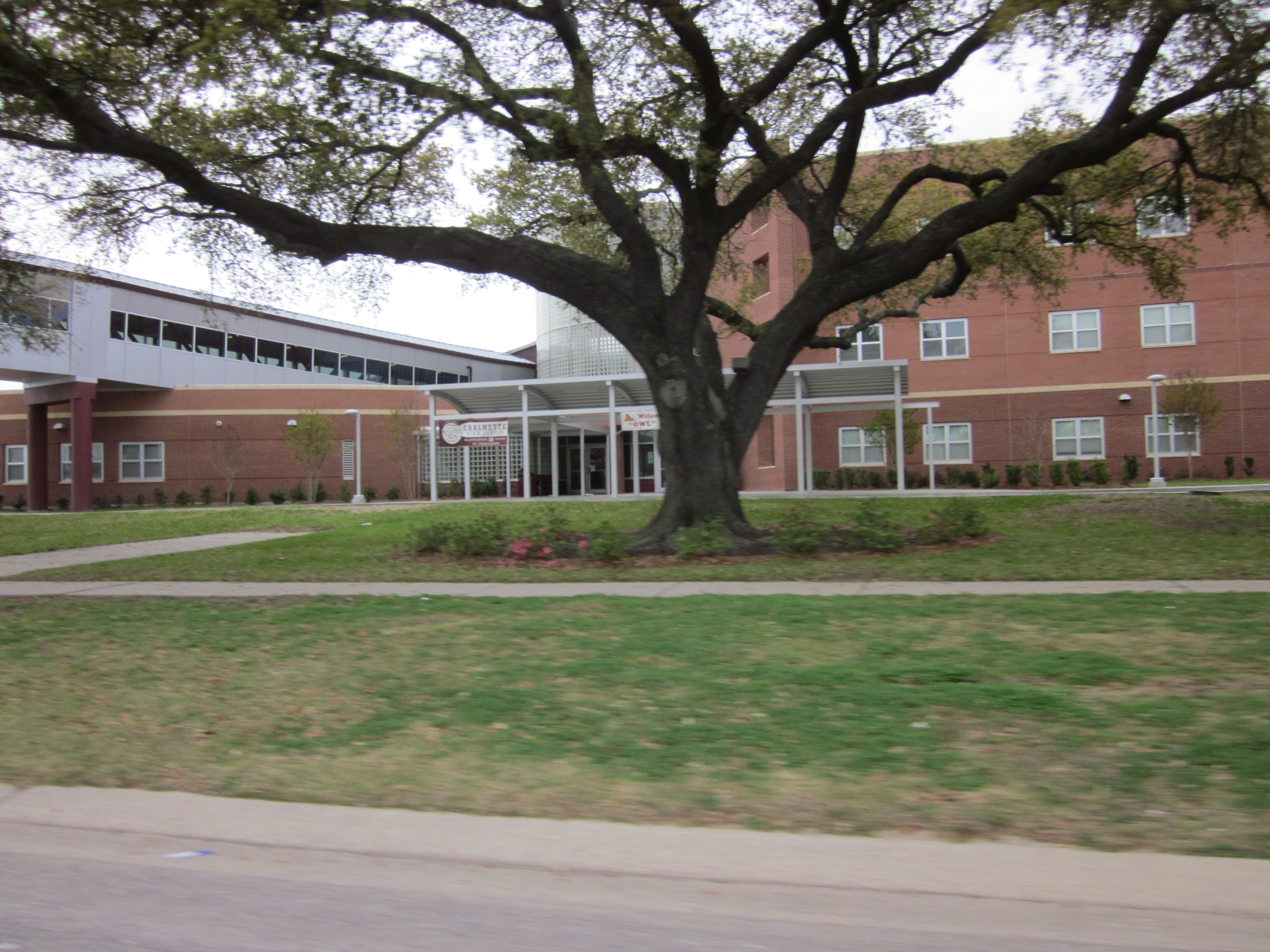
Chalmette High School

All schools are located in unincorporated communities, as no incorporated communities exist in St. Bernard Parish.

High school(s):

- Chalmette High School (Chalmette)

Middle schools:

- Andrew Jackson Middle School (Chalmette)
- St. Bernard Middle School (St. Bernard)
- Trist Middle School (Meraux)

Primary schools

- Arabi Elementary School (Arabi)
- Arlene Meraux Elementary School (Chalmette)
- Chalmette Elementary School (Chalmette)
- J. F. Gauthier Elementary School (Poydras)
- Joseph J. Davies Elementary School (Meraux)
- Lacoste Elementary School (Chalmette)
- W. Smith Elementary

Alternative schools:

- C.F. Rowley Alternative School (Chalmette)

The district plans to re-open additional schools when the enrollment dictates the opening of additional schools. In late 2015, land was donated to the St. Bernard Parish School Board in Chalmette by the Meraux Foundation, and will be the future site of Arlene Meraux Elementary School.

=== Formerly open schools ===
The following schools were open before Katrina. As of 2007 they have not been re-opened:

High Schools:

- Andrew Jackson Fundamental High School (Chalmette) (now a middle school)
- St. Bernard high School (St. Bernard) (now a middle school)

Middle schools:

- Chalmette Middle School (Chalmette) (now an elementary school)
- P. G. T. Beauregard Middle School (St. Bernard) (now an elementary school)

Elementary schools:

- C. F. Rowley Elementary School (Chalmette) (now an alternative school)
- Sebastien Roy Elementary School (St. Bernard)
- Milladon Elementary School (Violet)

Pre-Schools:

- Arabi Preschool (Arabi)

After Hurricane Katrina, classes were held at Chalmette High School under the St. Bernard Unified School, or SBUS. The school dissolved in 2006 and separated into Chalmette High School and Andrew Jackson Elementary School.

== School Board Members ==
Katherine Lemoine, District I

Henry J. Rodriguez, III, District 2

Kelly Le-Bowman, District 3

Sean K. Warner, District 4

Joseph "Joe" V. Long, District 5

Carly Creason, District 6

Diana B. Dysart, District 7

Millie Harris, District 8

Keisa M. Rodney, District 9

Rosiland White, District 10

Donald "Don" D. Campbell, District 11
