= Arabi, Louisiana =

- Census-designated place
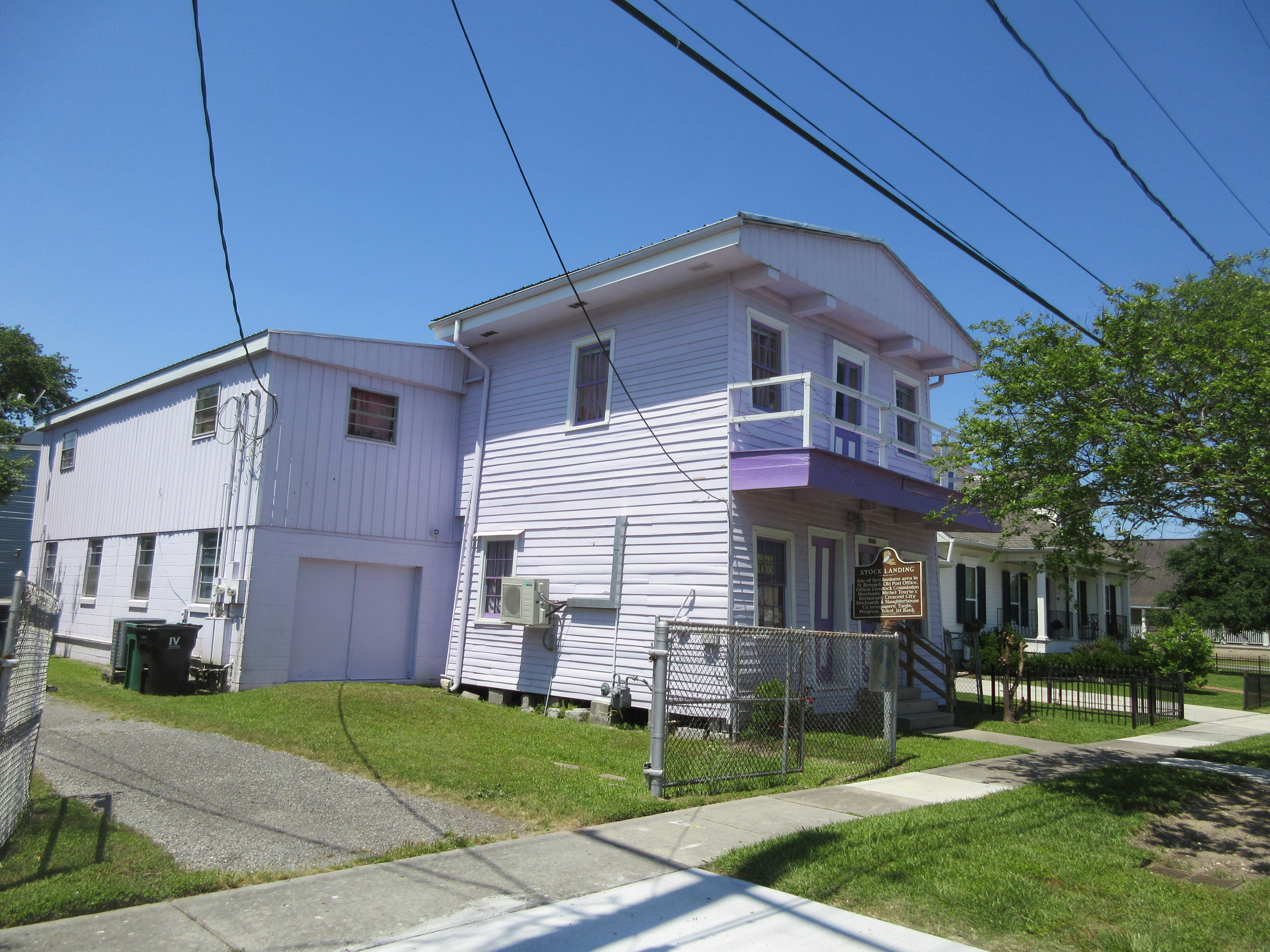
- Mehle Street, Arabi, Louisiana - historic building originally part of a lighthouse, formerly housing the St. Bernard Voice, as of 2026 housing Old Arabi Lighthouse Records and Books.

- Location in St. Bernard Parish and the state of Louisiana.
- Coordinates: 29°57′27″N 89°59′56″W
- Country: United States
- State: Louisiana
- Parish: St. Bernard

Area
  - Total: 2.03 sq mi (5.26 km^{2})
  - Land: 1.76 sq mi (4.55 km^{2})
  - Water: 0.27 sq mi (0.71 km^{2})
- Elevation: 3 ft (0.91 m)

Population (2020)
  - Total: 4,533
  - Density: 2,583/sq mi (997.3/km^{2})
- Time zone: UTC-6 (CST)
  - Summer (DST): UTC-5 (CDT)
- ZIP Code: 70032
- Area code: 504
- FIPS code: 22-02550

Arabi (/ˈærəbi/) is a census-designated place (CDP) in St. Bernard Parish, Louisiana, United States. It lies on the eastern bank of the Mississippi River, between the Lower 9th Ward of New Orleans and Chalmette within the Greater New Orleans metropolitan area. The population was 4,533 at the 2020 census.

== History ==
Arabi was established in the 19th century as a suburb of New Orleans, along the east bank of the Mississippi River. Arabi was part of Orleans Parish; however, a law passed in the 1880s stated that slaughterhouses could not be located within the City of New Orleans. An 1851 map calls the area Jacksonburgh, a name believe to be derived from Andrew Jackson. It is speculated by the publication that the town is named after Arabi Pasha (a mis-transliteration of his actual name Ahmed Urabi) who burned Alexandria, Egypt in 1882 while engaged in a revolt against the British administration in Egypt.

Arabi began as the community known as Stockyard Landing, because of the many stockyards and slaughterhouses located there. In the rear yards of some of houses in Old Arabi, there are remnants of blood traps from the area. When excavation for swimming pools was done, residents found dishes from New Orleans hotels and restaurants whose table scraps were once used to feed animals.

Business interests of the stockyards wanted to be free from control of New Orleans and persuaded the state of Louisiana to transfer dominion of the area downriver from Jackson Barracks to St. Bernard Parish in 1875.

=== Toponymy ===
The area was apparently named after the residents of the area who burned the courthouse down in the 1890s, according to an account published by the FWP in 1941, "reputedly because the incendiary activities of an Arabian sheik were at that time much in the news." The New York Times makes mention of the media frenzy in 1882 with a note that "The New Orleans Picayune has discovered that Arabi Pasha once sold confectionery in that city. But the Picayune has a habit of occasionally discovering things that are not so."

It is speculated by the publication that the town is named after Arabi Pasha (a mis-transliteration of his actual name Ahmed 'Urabi) who torched Alexandria, Egypt in 1882 while engaged in a revolt against the British administration in Egypt. The community felt that the revolt he was leading was a kindred spirit to their own revolt from New Orleans.

=== Gambling era (1907–1952) ===
In 1907, Friscoville Avenue was developed in Arabi. Because of a ban on gambling in the city limits of Orleans Parish, the area gambling center with approximately five gambling halls was located along the 100 block of Friscoville Avenue. Being just outside the Orleans Parish line, Friscoville was at the time easily accessible by the Canal Street Car Line.

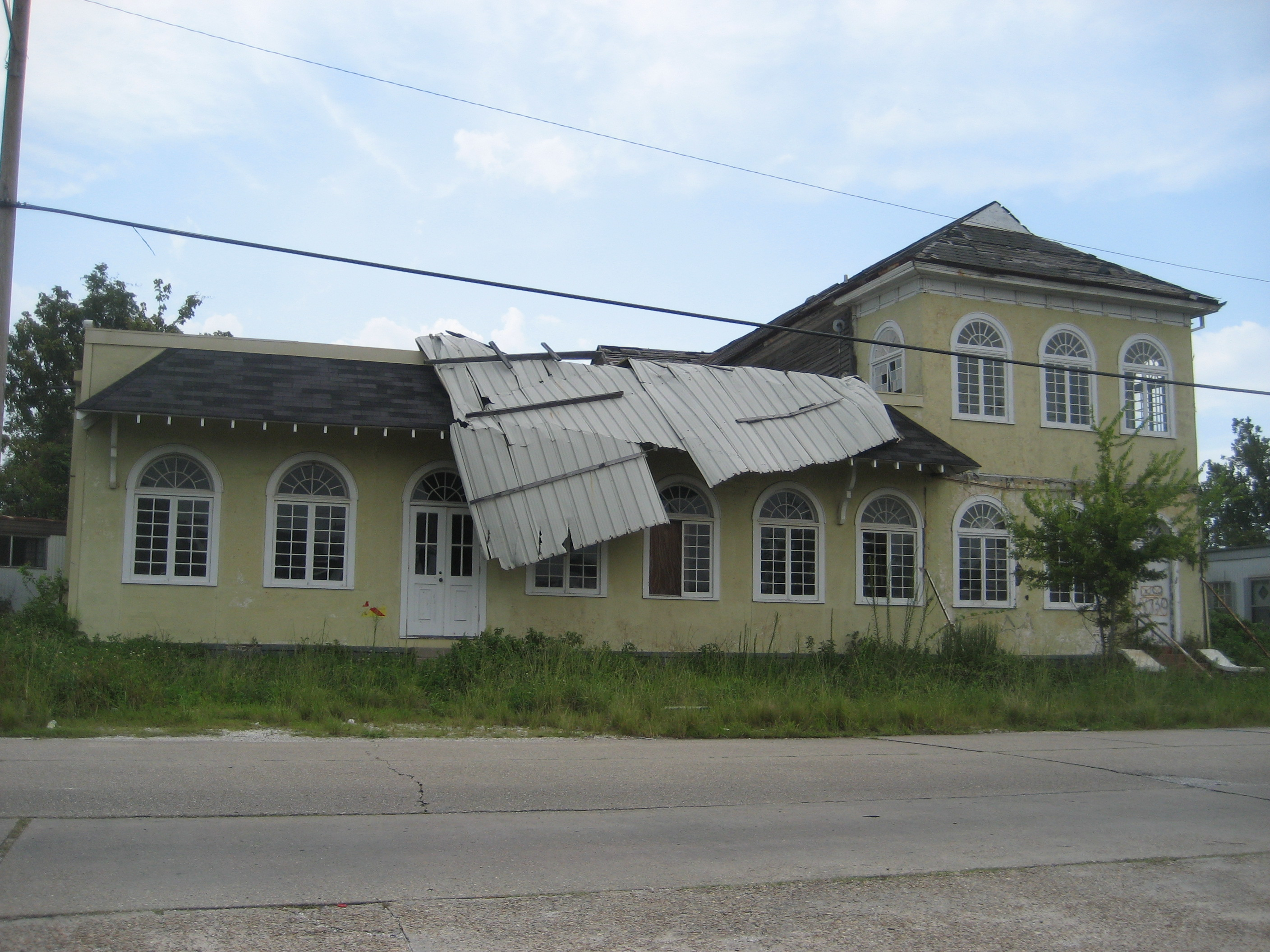
Former Arabi Club building (since demolished) after Hurricane Katrina.

The clubs were frequently raided by the authorities. One such raid was noted by the Associated Press in 1928, under governor Huey P. Long. Upon learning of the re-opening of two clubs in Arabi, he delivered the request to have the clubs raided by the National Guard in person:

Names of 225 persons found in the two places, the Jai-Alai Fronton and the Arabi Club, located just outside the New Orleans city limits, were taken for future reference. The patrons, many of whom were women, were released after being questioned.

Neil Simmes, staff photographer for the Time Picayune, was attacked and beaten by about fifty men as he attempted to take a picture. Guardsmen rescued him. He was unconscious when found. Three officers and five men went to the Jai-Alai Club and two officers and five men to the Arabi Club. The establishments face each other on the same street.

Heavily armed, the soldiers entered the clubs, women screamed and several fainted. A shot rang out, believed to have been fired by a sentry on guard to warn the gamblers of what was taking place. There was a quick grab for money on the gaming tables. Order was restored in a few moments. In a bonfire this afternoon the gambling paraphernalia that was flammable was burned. The remainder was hacked to bits with axes....

These establishments continued to operate until 1952, when they were shut down as part of a statewide crackdown on illegal gambling after the appointment of United States Army Colonel Francis Grevemberg as superintendent of the Louisiana State Police.

=== Historic areas ===
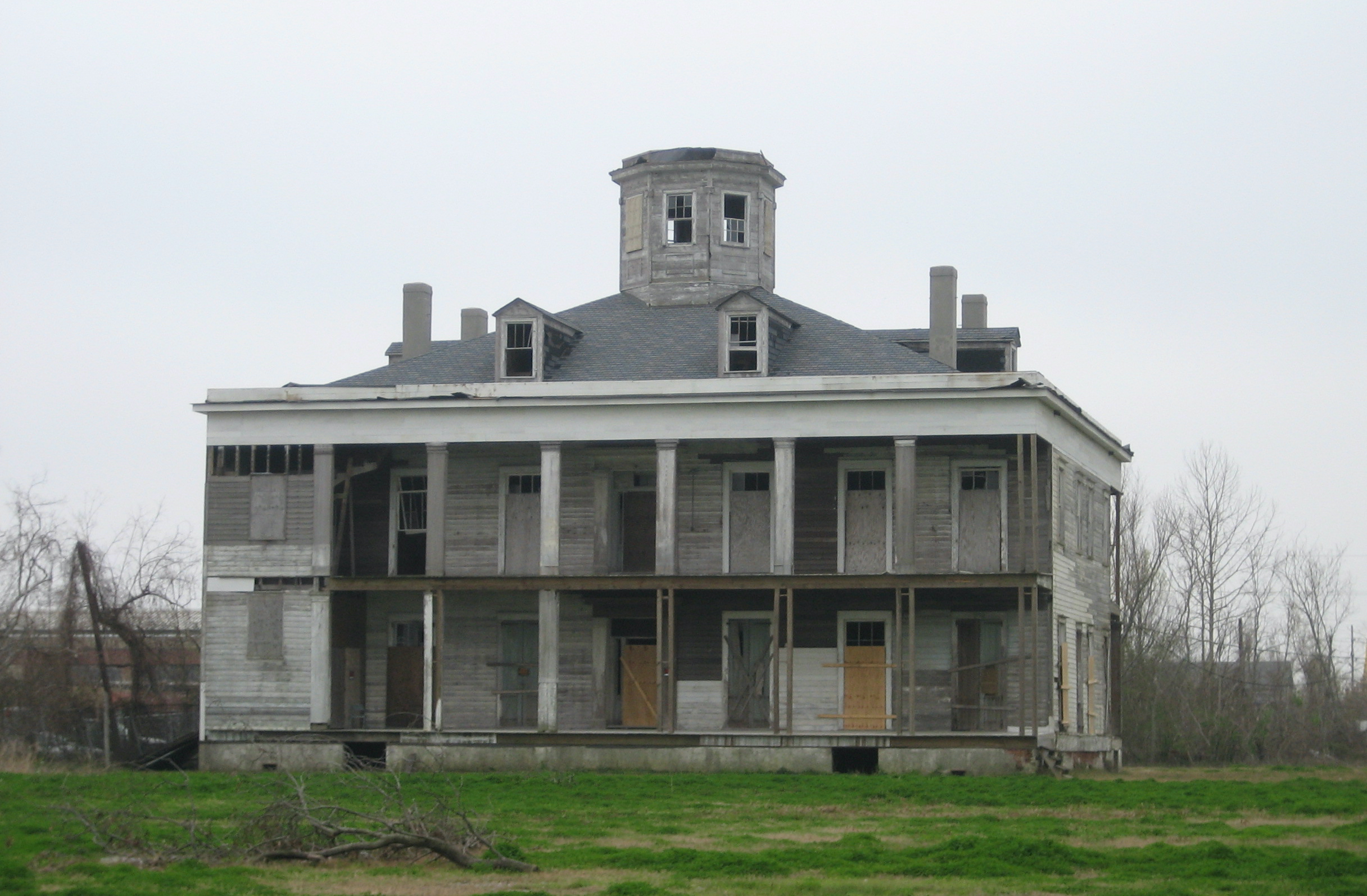
"Le Beau" began as a plantation house in 1854, and was later a hotel and gambling venue. Destroyed by arson in 2013.

The St. Bernard Voice, a local paper, began publishing in the late 19th century, was long produced from a small building on Mehle Street, near the Mississippi river in what was the original settlement, before moving to Chalmette in 2020.

Most of the area was declared a historic district in the 1970s, including the original St. Bernard Jail, and the remains of the LeBeau Plantation (destroyed by arson November 22, 2013).

=== Hurricane Betsy ===
Hurricane Betsy swept over the New Orleans area on the evening of September 9, 1965. Betsy caused a strong storm surge in the Mississippi River Gulf Outlet, a deep-water shipping channel to the east and south of New Orleans. Arabi and Chalmette are in St. Bernard Parish east and below New Orleans on the east bank of the Mississippi River. All of St. Bernard parish is sandwiched between the MRGO and the Mississippi River.

The storm surge over topped levees along the channel and on both sides of its terminus at the Industrial Canal in the Ninth Ward. There may have also been a breach of the Back Protection levee along Florida Avenue. The flooding covered areas of Gentilly and both the upper and lower Ninth Ward of New Orleans. The flooding spread to the east and inundated most of Arabi (except for areas of high ground near the river.) In Arabi, Betsy began to die down around 3am. Many residents, thinking the worst had passed, went to sleep around this time. The flooding reached Arabi Park around 4am waking the exhausted survivors to another phase of the disaster. Between 4am and 6am, the water rose between six and eight feet. By dawn, the water was making its way across the railroad grade between Arabi Park and Carolyn Park and flowing into Chalmette.

For days the survivors huddled in a few two-story buildings surrounded by water, with little or no supplies, power, running water or communications. There was no search and rescue or military presence. Eventually, they evacuated themselves by using their own fishing boats. They headed for higher ground which meant St. Claude Avenue (closer to the Mississippi River) in Arabi and the Kaiser Aluminum plant in Chalmette.

=== Hurricane Katrina ===
On August 29, 2005, Hurricane Katrina caused an even more massive storm surge which inundated all of Arabi, with water reaching higher than 20 feet (6.1 m) in some areas.

Much as occurred in Hurricane Betsy, locals who had elected to remain had noticed the winds had begun dying, this time shortly after dawn. Several stories have been noted of locals talking on cell phones with evacuated relatives as late as 8:30-9:00 a.m. CDT, stating they felt the worst was over. The first wave of water struck shortly after 9:00 a.m. and quickly surged all the way to the levee of the Mississippi River. Areas that had suffered less than 3–4 feet of water after Betsy were submerged as much as 10 feet (3.0 m).

In the Arabi Park area, the surge crossed over elevated railroad tracks and the resultant wave washed many homes off of their foundations, and completely destroyed others. Again, as in Hurricane Betsy the locals immediately began evacuating themselves and their neighbors using private boats. They brought them to the Mississippi river levee, which for several days was the only dry ground on the east side of the river for many miles. Local officials including U.S. Wildlife and Fisheries agents stationed in the parish moved quickly to seal off the area and supply food and water to the survivors. A makeshift evacuation was begun by confiscating small ferry boats, and moving the people to the west bank of the river at Algiers Point, where buses were used to move them out of the area. Most of this activity was not covered by the media due to the greater coverage of nearby New Orleans.

=== 2022 tornadoes ===
==== March ====
On March 22, 2022, an intense EF3 tornado struck Arabi just after 7:30 p.m. CDT, resulting in widespread damage along Friscoville Avenue, St. Bernard Highway, and Judge Perez Drive. Numerous homes were severely damaged or destroyed, cars were tossed, and many trees and power poles were snapped. Arabi Elementary School was damaged as well, and a brewery and a church were also destroyed. The tornado had originated near Gretna before passing through Arabi and continuing to New Orleans East. One person was killed, and several others were injured. Large metal transmission towers sustained major damage, and Arabi was left without power for days after the tornado.

==== December ====
On December 14, 2022, just nine months after the EF3 tornado struck the area, a strong EF2 tornado struck Arabi at around 4:00 p.m. CDT, again causing severe damage to the area. Homes in Arabi sustained significant structural damage, trees and power lines were downed, and the same brewery that was destroyed in the March tornado was destroyed once again. No fatalities occurred, though six people were injured.

== Geography ==
Arabi is located at 29°57′27″N 89°59′56″W (29.957554, -89.998994).

According to the United States Census Bureau, the CDP has a total area of 2.1 square miles (5.4 km^{2}), of which 1.8 square miles (4.7 km^{2}) is land and 0.3 square miles (0.78 km^{2}) is water.

== Demographics ==
Historical population
Census	Pop.	Note	%±
1980	10,248		—
1990	8,787		−14.3%
2000	8,093		−7.9%
2010	3,635		−55.1%
2020	4,533		24.7%
U.S. Decennial Census; 1950 1960 1970 1980; 1990 2000 2010

Arabi first appeared as a census designated place in the 1980 U.S. census.

Arabi CDP, Louisiana – Racial and ethnic composition Note: the U.S. Census Bureau treats Hispanic/Latino as an ethnic category. This table excludes Latinos from the racial categories and assigns them to a separate category. Hispanics/Latinos may be of any race.
Race / Ethnicity (NH = Non-Hispanic)	Pop 2000	Pop 2010	Pop 2020	% 2000	% 2010	% 2020
White alone (NH)	7,447	2,709	2,739	92.02%	74.53%	60.42%
Black or African American alone (NH)	72	360	721	0.89%	9.90%	15.91%
Native American or Alaska Native alone (NH)	25	32	15	0.31%	0.88%	0.33%
Asian alone (NH)	60	44	133	0.74%	1.21%	2.93%
Native Hawaiian or Pacific Islander alone (NH)	0	0	0	0.00%	0.00%	0.00%
Other race alone (NH)	8	23	40	0.10%	0.63%	0.88%
Mixed race or Multiracial (NH)	68	99	240	0.84%	2.72%	5.29%
Hispanic or Latino (any race)	413	368	645	5.10%	10.12%	14.23%
Total	8,093	3,635	4,533	100.00%	100.00%	100.00%

In 2010, there were 2,709 people in Arabi; and by the 2020 United States census, there were 4,533 people, 1,683 households, and 961 families residing in the CDP.

=== Religion ===
The Roman Catholic Archdiocese of New Orleans operates area Catholic churches. In 2008 it closed St. Louise Marillac Church in Arabi. It, along with three other churches, were consolidated into Our Lady of Prompt Succor Church in Chalmette. The archdiocese razed the church in 2009.

== Education ==
Residents are zoned to schools in the St. Bernard Parish Public Schools.

As of 2007, Chalmette High School serves the population.

== Notable people ==
- Patrick Scheuermann, Director of NASA's Marshall Space Flight Center
- Christina Cuenca, Miss Louisiana USA 2006
- Al Copeland, founder of Popeyes Chicken & Biscuits
- Juvenile, Southern rapper
