= Chalmette, Louisiana =

- Census-designated place
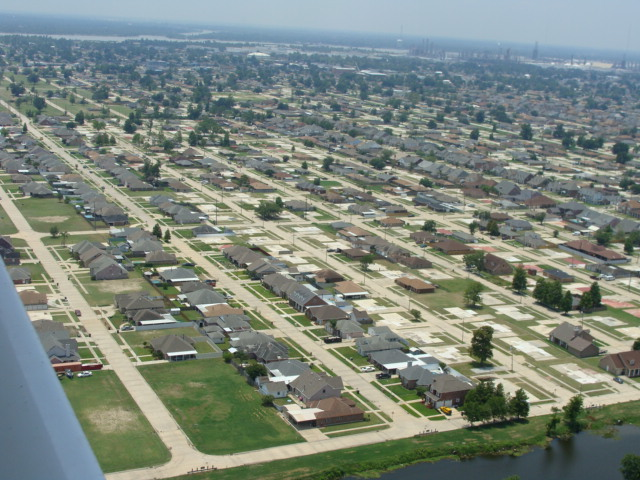
- View of Chalmette residential area

- Location in St. Bernard Parish and the state of Louisiana.
- Coordinates: 29°56′44″N 89°57′42″W
- Country: United States
- State: Louisiana
- Parish: St. Bernard

Area
  - Total: 7.97 sq mi (20.63 km^{2})
  - Land: 7.17 sq mi (18.58 km^{2})
  - Water: 0.79 sq mi (2.04 km^{2})
- Elevation: 3 ft (0.91 m)

Population (2020)
  - Total: 21,562
  - Density: 3,005.4/sq mi (1,160.38/km^{2})
- Time zone: UTC-6 (CST)
  - Summer (DST): UTC-5 (CDT)
- ZIP Codes: 70043, 70044
- Area code: 504
- FIPS code: 22-14135

Chalmette (/ʃælˈmɛt/ shal-MET) is a census-designated place (CDP) in and the parish seat of St. Bernard Parish in southeastern Louisiana, United States. The 2010 census reported that Chalmette had 16,751 people; 2011 population was listed as 17,119; however, the pre-Katrina population was 32,069 at the 2000 census. At the 2020 U.S. census, its population rebounded to 21,562. Chalmette is part of the New Orleans–Metairie–Kenner metropolitan statistical area. Chalmette is located east of downtown New Orleans and south of Arabi, towards Lake Borgne.

The community was named for plantation owner Louis-Xavier Martin de Lino de Chalmette. Chalmette was appended to the family name after acquiring their Louisiana plantation, in honour of Louis-Xavier Martin de Lino's paternal great-grandmother, Antoinette Chalmette (died 1711) Chalmette, in French, means "pasture", or "fallow land", (and traces to the Proto-Celtic word *kalm).

== History ==
Chalmette was founded by plantation owner Louis-Xavier Martin de Lino de Chalmette (1720–1755), a native of Quebec and grandson of René-Louis Chartier de Lotbinière of Maison Lotbinière. His eldest son, Louis Xavier Martin de Lino de Chalmette (1753–1814) was born there and married the sister of Antoine Philippe de Marigny, grandfather of Bernard de Marigny.

In January 1815, the Battle of New Orleans was fought at the Chalmette plantation, then owned by his second son, Ignace Martin de Lino de Chalmette (1755–1815), a maternal half-brother of Col. Pierre Denis de La Ronde (founder of Versailles, Louisiana), who commanded the Louisiana militia's Third Regiment during the battle. The American forces under Major General Andrew Jackson defeated the British forces (led by brevet Lieutenant General Sir Edward Pakenham). On Andrew Jackson's orders, the Chalmette plantation was completely destroyed during the battle to prevent the British from using it for cover.

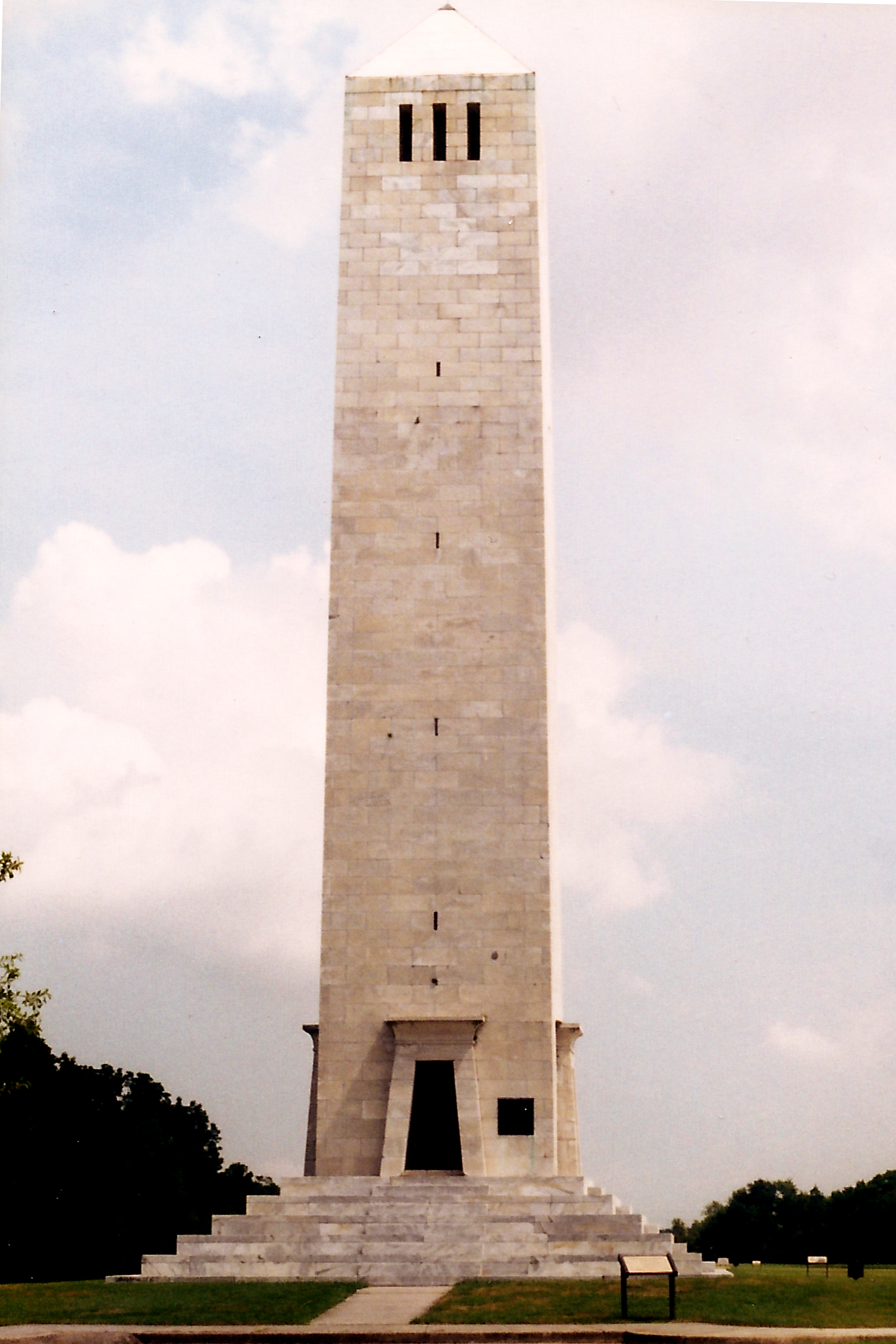
Chalmette Battlefield Monument

The battlefield is preserved as a national monument complete with visitor center, and the Chalmette National Cemetery is adjacent. Since the mid-1970s, the site has been part of the Jean Lafitte National Historical Park and Preserve, a multi-site National Park Service property with its headquarters located in the French Quarter of New Orleans.

The Greek Revival-style plantation house next to the Chalmette battlefield, named the Malus-Beauregard House, was built in 1830 and is open to the public.

From 1951 to 1983, Chalmette was the location of a major Kaiser Aluminum plant.

=== Hurricane Katrina ===
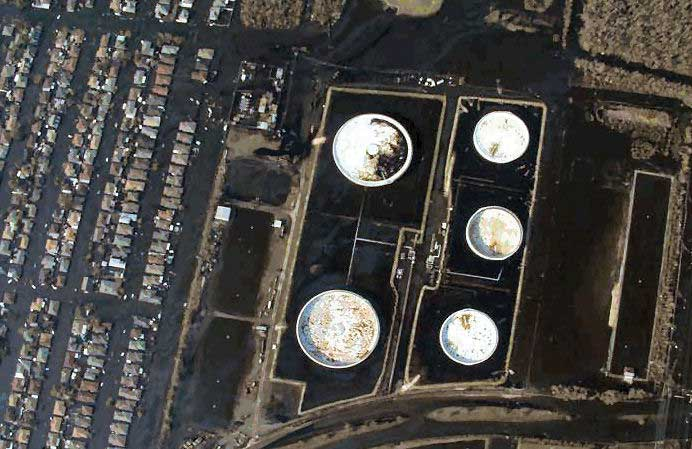
Hurricane Katrina: aerial photo of oil spill in Chalmette, showing oil slick on streets (September 2005).

On August 29, 2005, a 25-foot (7.6 m) storm surge from Hurricane Katrina overflowed through the Mississippi River–Gulf Outlet Canal (commonly known as MRGO)—a commercial channel dug by the United States Army Corps of Engineers in the 1960s—and flooded most of the town, with waters as high as 14 to 15 feet (4.9 m) in some places. As a result, Chalmette was extensively swamped and destroyed. A majority of the population evacuated shortly before the storm hit, but there was still significant loss of life.

As of October 25, 2005, most of the buildings were deemed unsalvageable. Despite findings published by the U.S. EPA, the toxic chemicals in the water from local oil refineries have been postulated to be an ongoing health hazard by several civilian ecological groups. Especially notable was the large oil spill originating in Chalmette's Murphy Oil facility, where the storm surge knocked over a huge oil tank (see photo below).

The parish administrative headquarters served as the site for a Federal Emergency Management Agency (FEMA) trailer park for numerous civil servants who were laboring in the rebuilding effort. A year later, parish employees were still working shifts around the clock to bring the community back to life.

Another center in the rebuilding effort was centered at the church of Our Lady of Prompt Succor, which served the congregations of the seven other Roman Catholic parishes as well as the main office of Catholic Relief Services. It also served as the only place to hold funerals for the first 12 months after Katrina.

Deputies working for the St. Bernard Parish Sheriff stated in early December 2005 that the oil tank floated in the flood. When the water receded, the tank settled on uneven ground. Its structural integrity was compromised, and then the oil spill occurred. By late November, the Murphy facility was functional, as was a small cluster of businesses around the intersection of Paris Road and St. Bernard Highway, on the least damaged River side of Chalmette. The devastated residential areas farther away from the River were open during daylight hours, for residents to salvage belongings from their damaged homes. The majority of people staying in Chalmette full-time were living in trailers, which began to be supplied by FEMA or private enterprises on October 12; although many who had been promised FEMA trailer housing were still waiting as late as March 2006, seven months after the hurricane.

"Camp Premier," renamed "Camp Hope," was established as a base camp for the community's rebuilding efforts, facilitating the work of relief organizations, the National Guard, and private individuals. As of August 2007, the camp is located at P.G.T. Beauregard Middle School and operated by Habitat for Humanity, to provide for relief volunteers in St. Bernard Parish. Other organizations, such as the St. Bernard Project, have also participated in the rebuilding of Chalmette, from distributing supplies, to clearing debris, to repairing damaged houses.

The Chalmette Battlefield was also partially flooded in low-lying areas, destroying the visitor center, which has since been rebuilt.

=== Gradual recovery ===
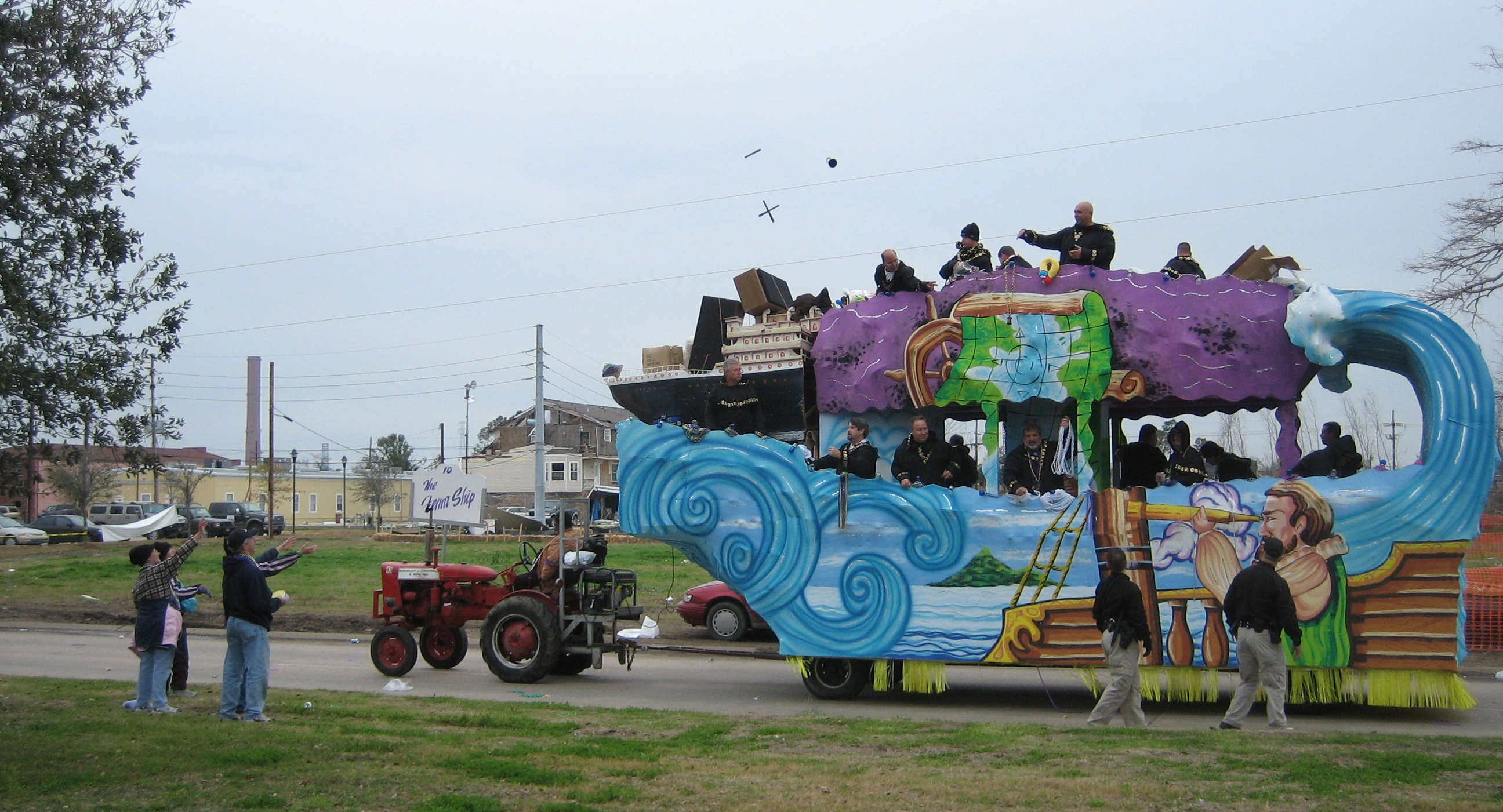
Mardi Gras 2006 in Chalmette: float No. 10 "The FEMA Ship"

St. Bernard Parish has celebrated Mardi Gras with parades in Chalmette. In February 2006, the krewe of the Knights of Nemesis held a parade, past many buildings still in ruins, along the streets of Chalmette.

As of early 2008, many businesses have returned to the area, schools have reopened, although the population remains significantly below pre-Katrina levels.

Due to Hurricane Katrina, the St. Bernard Parish School Board succeeded in getting a school open despite considerable difficulties, including telling FEMA that it would not wait for the agency. The parish opened the St. Bernard Unified School as a K-12 school in late 2005.

With the opening of the 2006–2007 school year, the Unified school reverted to Chalmette High School and now houses grades 9–12. The former Andrew Jackson High School has been repaired and now houses grades 6–8. Trist Middle School houses grades 6 through 8.

The Catholic and private school sector was lost to Katrina. The Roman Catholic Archdiocese of New Orleans has consolidated all local schools into one, on the Our Lady of Prompt Succor campus. It has grades PK-8.

== Geography ==
Chalmette is located at 29°56′44″N 89°57′42″W (29.945504, -89.961602), along the Mississippi River and has an elevation of 3 feet (0.9 m). It is located east of New Orleans, and is part of the Greater New Orleans area. According to the United States Census Bureau, the CDP has a total area of 7.9 square miles (20 km^{2}), of which 7.3 square miles (19 km^{2}) is land, and 0.6 square miles (1.6 km^{2}) (7.56%) is water.

== Demographics ==
Historical population
| Census | Pop. | Note | %± |
|---|---|---|---|
| 1950 | 1,695 | | — |
| 1980 | 33,847 | | — |
| 1990 | 31,860 | | −5.9% |
| 2000 | 32,069 | | 0.7% |
| 2010 | 16,751 | | −47.8% |
| 2020 | 21,562 | | 28.7% |
U.S. Decennial Census; 1950 1960 1970 1980; 1990 2000 2010

Chalmette first appeared as an unincorporated place in the 1950 U.S. census. It did not appear in the 1960 U.S. census or the 1970 U.S. census before reappearing as a census designated place in the 1980 United States census.

Chalmette, Louisiana – Racial and ethnic composition Note: the US Census treats Hispanic/Latino as an ethnic category. This table excludes Latinos from the racial categories and assigns them to a separate category. Hispanics/Latinos may be of any race.
| Race / Ethnicity (NH = Non-Hispanic) | Pop 2000 | Pop 2010 | Pop 2020 | % 2000 | % 2010 | % 2020 |
|---|---|---|---|---|---|---|
| White alone (NH) | 28,606 | 11,868 | 10,953 | 89.20% | 70.85% | 50.80% |
| Black or African American alone (NH) | 756 | 2,165 | 5,567 | 2.36% | 12.92% | 25.82% |
| Native American or Alaska Native alone (NH) | 133 | 62 | 90 | 0.41% | 0.37% | 0.42% |
| Asian alone (NH) | 573 | 493 | 633 | 1.79% | 2.94% | 2.94% |
| Native Hawaiian or Pacific Islander alone (NH) | 4 | 8 | 6 | 0.01% | 0.05% | 0.03% |
| Other race alone (NH) | 22 | 86 | 182 | 0.07% | 0.51% | 0.84% |
| Mixed race or Multiracial (NH) | 432 | 343 | 892 | 1.35% | 2.05% | 4.14% |
| Hispanic or Latino (any race) | 1,543 | 1,726 | 3,239 | 4.81% | 10.30% | 15.02% |
| Total | 32,069 | 16,751 | 21,562 | 100.00% | 100.00% | 100.00% |

At the 2020 United States census, there were 21,562 people, 7,544 households, and 5,116 families residing in the CDP. At the 2019 American Community Survey, the racial and ethnic makeup of the census-designated place was 68.8% non-Hispanic white, 22.2% African American, 0.5% American Indian and Alaska Native, 3.4% Asian, 0.1% Native Hawaiian and other Pacific Islander, 1.9% some other race, and 3.1% two or more races. Hispanics and Latin Americans of any race made up 10.6% of the population. Of the population, 11.5% spoke a language other than English at home; Spanish was the second most-spoken language. In 2019, the median household income was $43,976 and an estimated 22.4% of the population lived at or below the poverty line. By 2020, the racial and ethnic composition of the CDP was 50.8% non-Hispanic white, 25.82% Black or African American, 0.42% American Indian and Alaska Native, 2.94% Asian, 0.03% Pacific Islander, 4.98% multiracial or some other race, and 15.02% Hispanic or Latin American of any race.

== Sports and recreation ==
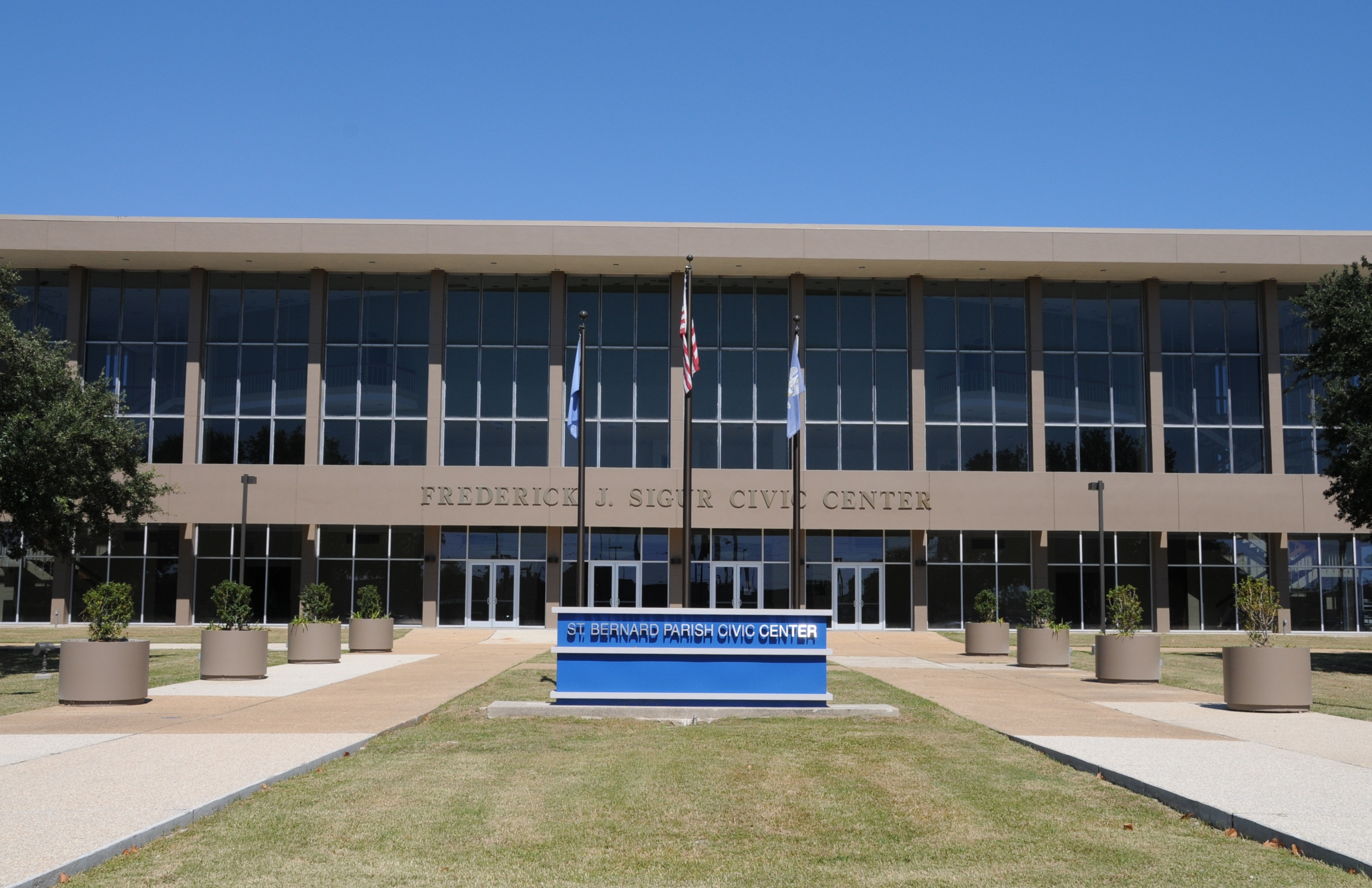
Frederick J. Sigur Civic Center

- Frederick J. Sigur Civic Center - Auditorium and ballroom
- Val Riess Recreation Complex - baseball fields, softball fields and multi-purpose building for basketball and volleyball

== Education ==
It is in the St. Bernard Parish School District.

- Chalmette High School

== Notable people ==
- Walter Boasso, former state senator
- Jimmy Messa, popular New Orleans musician, bass player for Americana band The Subdudes.
- Kevin Northcutt, professional wrestler
- Mitchell Robinson, American basketball player for the Boston Celtics of the NBA
- Norris Weese, quarterback for Ole Miss and the Denver Broncos
- Tommy Wiseau, film director, producer, and actor.

== See also ==
- Andrew Jackson Fundamental Magnet High School
- Chalmette National Cemetery
- Samuel B. Nunez, Jr.
- Leander Perez
- Jean Lafitte National Historical Park and Preserve
- The Colony U.S. TV series
