= Chalmette High School =

Public school in Chalmette, Louisiana, United States

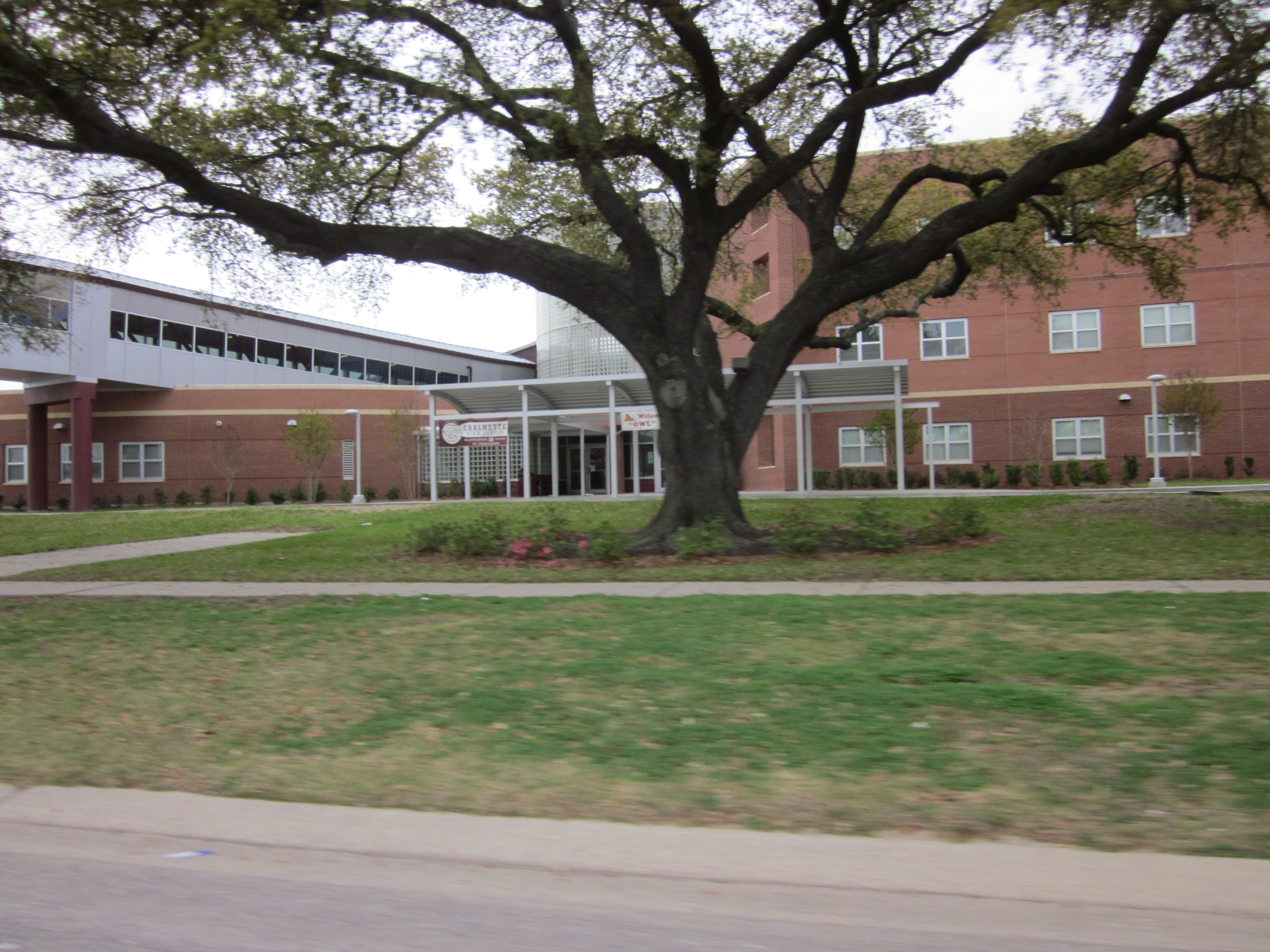

Location
- 1100 East Judge Perez Drive; Chalmette, Louisiana 70043; United States; 29°56′22″N 89°57′12″W

Information
- Type: Public, co-educational
- Established: 1926, took current name in 1954. Current campus opened in 1962.
- School board: St. Bernard Parish Public Schools
- Superintendent: Doris Voitier
- Principal: Wayne Warner (1973-2024) William Schneider (2024-Present)
- Teaching staff: 163.86 (on an FTE basis)
- Grades: 9–12
- Gender: coed
- Student to teacher ratio: 14.14
- Education system: Block scheduling
- Campus: Main Campus (10-12); Lacoste Campus (9th)
- Campus size: 35 acres (140,000 m^{2})
- Campus type: Suburban
- Colors: Maroon and white
- Song: Chalmette Alma Mater
- Fight song: Chalmette High Fight Song
- Athletics: LHSAA
- Athletics conference: District 8, class 5A
- Sports: 14 boys, 13 girls
- Mascot: Owls
- Nickname: Fighting Owls
- Rival: Holy Cross High School
- Accreditation: Southern Association of Colleges and Schools
- Publication: Magnum Opus (literary magazine)
- Newspaper: The Owl Post
- Yearbook: Maroon Memories
- Website: chs.sbpsb.org

Chalmette High School is a public secondary school in the unincorporated Chalmette area of St. Bernard Parish, Louisiana, United States. It is a part of St. Bernard Parish Public Schools.

== History ==
The history of Chalmette High School began in 1926 with the addition of a freshman class to Meraux Elementary School. An additional grade level was added each of three subsequent years until a four-year institution could be established. Prior to 1926, any student wanting a high school diploma had to transfer to an Orleans Parish Public School. Orleans Parish agreed to educate any secondary student from St. Bernard for a nominal annual fee paid by St. Bernard Parish School Board.

The first high school in St. Bernard Parish was named Joseph Maumus High School and was located on Friscoville Street in Old Arabi. In 1947, with the construction of a new high school building in Arabi, the name became Arabi High School. The school acquired its nickname from an owl figurine that hung above the school entrance.

In 1954, Arabi High School changed its name to Chalmette Senior High School as it moved to the site of the current Chalmette Elementary School. A new facility was constructed at the corner of Goodchildren (which later became East Judge Perez) and Palmisano, and Chalmette Senior High moved there in 1962.

In the fall of 1966, Chalmette High School became an all-boys high school. This helped meet the demand of more classrooms to house the school population. The solution to the problem of having four co-ed high schools was to segregate by sex. This would cut costs drastically since the parish would only have to build and maintain two stadiums instead of four. Andrew Jackson High School and PGT Beauregard High School served girls for the next 22 years, and they became the "sister" schools to Chalmette and St. Bernard respectively.

During the 1968–1969 term, the school's name was officially changed to Chalmette High School.

In 1970, the Owls joined the New Orleans Catholic League, in the LHSAA's new class 4A. Wayne Warner became the principal in 1973.

In 1971, an addition was built. Chalmette left the Catholic League football district after the 1988 season.

=== After Katrina ===
After Katrina... Chalmette High School for the last two years has received an A letter grade, placing it among the top high schools in the state. The 2018 senior class featured a 91 percent graduation rate with 450 graduates who earned more than $13 million in college scholarship funds. Seven students graduated with a high school diploma and an associate of applied science degree in petroleum Technology (PTEC) from Nunez Community College, and 270 graduates earned direct college credit through dual enrollment.

— Tommy Santora

In 2005, the parish was devastated by Hurricane Katrina. The St. Bernard Parish Public Schools opened a school in trailers set up in the stadium parking lot in November 2005. Chalmette High School played temporarily under the St. Bernard Unified School banner in its sports. By the springtime, the main building on Judge Perez had been repaired. With FEMA funding, Chalmette High School was rebuilt after the storm.

As St. Bernard Parish started to repopulate, Chalmette High School joined LHSAA class 5A for the first time in its history for the 2007 football season, and rejoined the Catholic League. The freshman academy is now located across Judge Perez at the former Lacoste Elementary. Motorola provided $50,000 to rebuild technology infrastructure in 2008, before the scheduled new campus was to open in 2009.

In 2009, U.S. News magazine released its rankings of the best high schools in America, based on test scores and other factors. Chalmette earned a bronze medal as one of 39 schools in Louisiana to make the list. Chalmette High received an "A" rating in 2020-2021 from the state of Louisiana.

Athletic facilities have been renovated. In 2015, a new school library and administrative offices were completed.

== Demographics ==
By 2019, the numbers of minorities had increased as a result of post-Hurricane Katrina population shifts. Audra Burch of The New York Times wrote, "The rebuilding brought more diversity, and today, of the 1,972 students at Chalmette High, about 52 percent are students of color. Minorities continued to represent 52.7% of the student population in the 2021-2022 school Year.

== Athletics ==
Chalmette High athletics competes in Class 5A of the LHSAA.

=== Athletics history ===
The school has never won a state championship in school history. The Owls have bounced between districts in their history, with their longest stay in one district being from 1970 to 1989, in the famed New Orleans Catholic League Chalmette left the Catholic League in 1989, then returned from 2007 to 2011.

Due to the closure of St. Bernard and Andrew Jackson High Schools and the re-locations of Archbishop Hannan and Holy Cross, Chalmette became the only High School in St. Bernard Parish, thus moving the school to class 5A, the highest classification of the LHSAA, for the first time in 2007.

In 2013, the Owls joined district 8-5A consisting of mostly Jefferson Parish Public Schools.

For the 2024–25 and 2025-26 school years, Chalmette will compete in a district with four schools from St. Tammany Parish: Fontainebleau (Mandeville), Northshore (Slidell), Salmen (Slidell) and Slidell High.

== Notable alumni ==
- Walter Boasso, former state senator
- Mitchell Robinson, NBA player
- Nate Thomas, NFL player
- Norris Weese, NFL player

== Film location ==
The Chalmette High School gymnasium was a setting for the 2006 film, Glory Road.

== See also ==
- St. Bernard Parish Public Schools
