= List of islands of the United States =

This is a partial list of notable islands of the United States, including its insular areas, which are listed at the end.

== Arizona ==
- Mormon Island (Colorado River)

== Arkansas ==
- Arbuckle Island

== Colorado ==
- Bridge Island, Steamboat Lake
- Deer Island, Lake Granby - U.S. Geological Survey Geographic Names Information System: Deer Island
- Elephant Island, Lake Granby - U.S. Geological Survey Geographic Names Information System: Elephant Island
- Fish Island, Lake Granby
- Fishhook Island, Lake Dillon
- Gull Island, Lake Granby - U.S. Geological Survey Geographic Names Information System: Gull Island.
- Hadfield Island, South Platte River - U.S. Geological Survey Geographic Names Information System: Hadfield Island
- Harvey Island, Lake Granby - U.S. Geological Survey Geographic Names Information System: Harvey Island
- Monkey Island (Denver)
- Penny Island (Denver)
- Piedra Island, Lake Granby
- Rainbow Island, Lake Granby - U.S. Geological Survey Geographic Names Information System: Rainbow Island
- Scout Island, Greeley (Weld County) - U.S. Geological Survey Geographic Names Information System: Scout Island
- Shelter Island, Lake Granby - U.S. Geological Survey Geographic Names Information System: Shelter Island
- Sentinel Island (Colorado), Lake Dillon
- Silver Dollar Island, Lake Dillon
- The Island (Cheesman Reservoir)
- Watson Island, Colorado River

== Georgia ==
Several Sea Islands, including

- Cockspur Island
- Cumberland Island
- Jekyll Island
- Little Tybee Island
- Sapelo Island
- St. Catherines Island
- St. Simons Island
- Tybee Island
- Wassaw Island
- Ossabaw Island
- Egg Island
- Wolf Island
- Butler Island
- Blackbeard Island

== Idaho ==
- Bartoo Island
- Rock Island

== Illinois ==
- Rock Island Arsenal

== Indiana ==
- Biddle Island
- Holmes Island
- Ribeyre Island

== Iowa ==
- Credit Island
- Mays Island
- Nine-Mile Island (Mississippi River)
- Sabula
- Sans Souci Island

== Kentucky ==
- Big Bone Island, Ohio River
- Corn Island, Ohio River (submerged underwater)
- Diamond Island, Ohio River
- Laughery Island
- Saline Island (Johnson Island)
- Six Mile Island, Ohio River near downtown Louisville

== Louisiana ==
There are more than 100 named islands in Louisiana. Many of these are barrier islands which are the result of seven delta complexes, created by the changing course of the Mississippi over the last 6,000 years. There are several formation theories and one or more could be relevant to the creation of the islands. Barrier islands are the frontline protection of the coast of Louisiana. The effects of nature and climate-driven hazards, as well as human interference, has endangered many of the islands which may suffer the fate of East Timbalier Island.

- Avery Island (salt dome)
- Avoca Island
- Belle Isle, Louisiana: (salt dome) 4,500 acres (1,800 ha), that is a private Island, owned by Belle Isle, LLC (2001), with Chester F. Morrison sole principle. It is only accessible by boat. Belle Isle is now used by Mr. Morrison and any guests for wildlife conservation, hunting, and fishing.
- Breton Islands. Two islands, North and south Breton Island. North Breton Island is not part of the Breton National Wildlife Refuge.
- Isle Brevelle
- Chaland Island: Barrier island located in the Barataria Basin, between Pass Chaland and Grand Bayou Pass, south of Bay Joe Wise in Plaquemines Parish, Louisiana.
- Chandeleur Islands (Les Iles de Chandeleur): The northern most barrier island chain which includes (north to south) North Islands, New Harbor Islands, Freemason Islands, Curlew Island, Grand Gosier Island, South Chandeleur Island, and Breton Island. All are included in the Breton National Wildlife Refuge. See Chandeleur Island Light. See Chandeleur Island Light.
- Cheniere Caminada Island, shortened to Caminada Island and now called Caminada Headland. See: Cheniere Caminada, Louisiana.
- Chenier Ronquille Island: A barrier island. 8 miles east of Grand Isle at the southern end of Barataria Bay.
- Cote Blanche: Cote Blanche Island, a 1,000-acre elevated salt dome. Formally Cote Blanche Salt Mine.
- Curlew Island: Part of the Chandeleur Islands chain and Breton National Wildlife Refuge it is considered a shoal.
- Davis Island: Partially in Louisiana.
- Demourelles Island
- East Grand Terre Island, Louisiana. See: Fort Livingston, Louisiana
- East Timbalier Island: Once a 400-acre coastal sanctuary, East Timbalier Island National Wildlife Refuge (NWR), but now delisted.

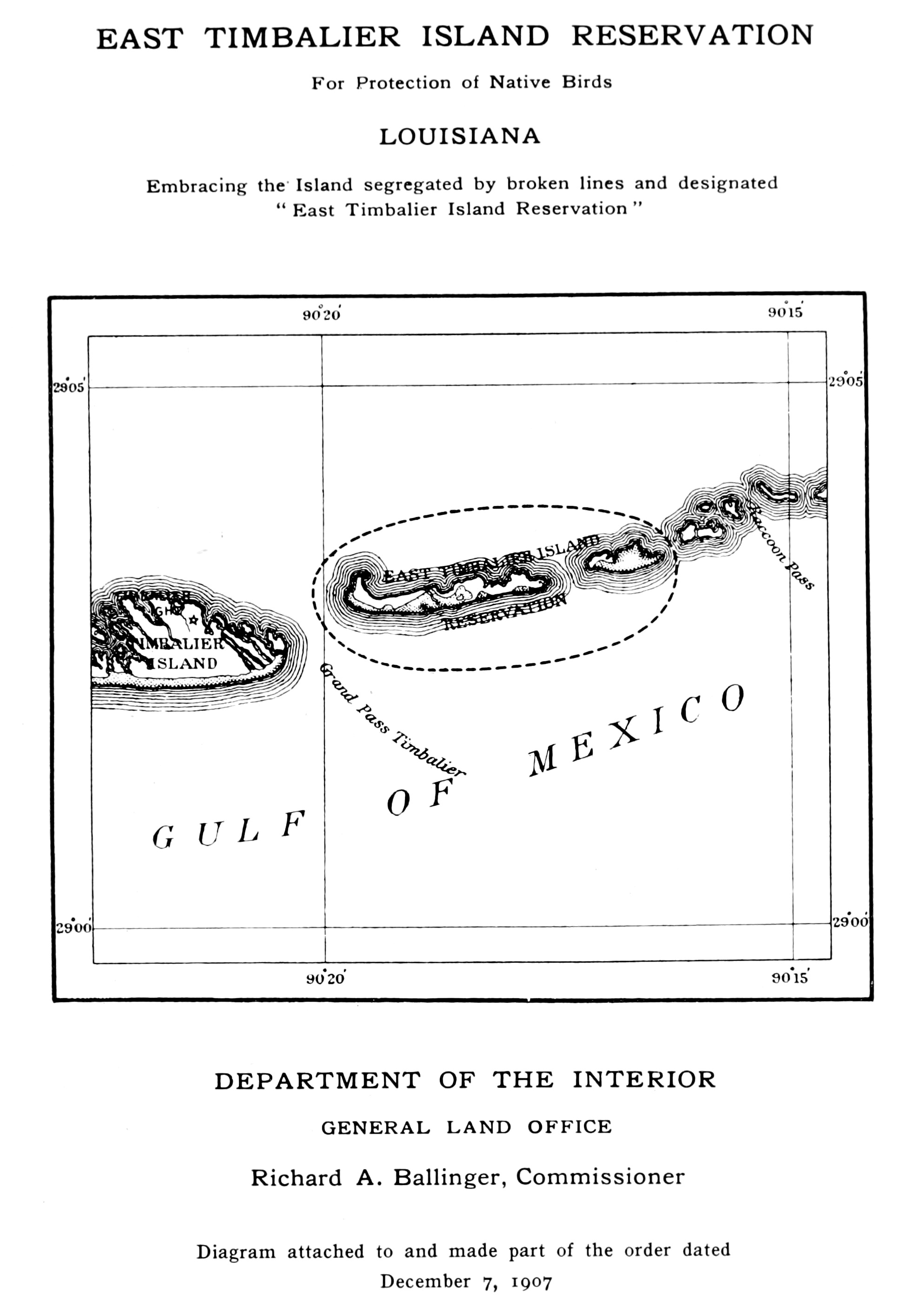
East Timbalier Island Reservation EO 718 illustration

- Elmer's Island: A refuge on Elmer's Island.
- Fifi Island: Barrier island. Sits just north of Grand Island.
- Grand Gosier Islands: North and South Gosier barrier islands are considered shoals. Included in the Chandeleurs chain. Part of the Breton National Wildlife Refuge.
- Grand Isle
- Isle de Jean Charles, Louisiana: Former home of the "Jean Charles Choctaw Nation". The island was 5 miles (8.0 km) wide and 11 miles (18 km) long, but is now 1/4 mile (400 m) wide and 2 miles (3.2 km) long. The tribe is relocating.
- Jefferson Island (salt dome) where the Joseph Jefferson House is located and in the area of the Jefferson Island disaster. Location of the Diamond Crystal Salt Mine.
- Last Island (currently renamed Isles Dernieres Barrier Island Refuge) is a barrier island.
- Marsh Island
- Queen Bess Island
- Scofield Island: 2.4 miles (3.9 km) barrier island in Plaquemines Parish, Louisiana.
- Shell Island (Plaquemines Parish):
- Virgin Island: See: Pierre Part, Louisiana.
- Timbalier Island
- Weeks Island: Morton Weeks Island Salt Mine (salt dome). The land is mostly owned by the Morton Salt Company. Dow Chemical Company owns a chemical vapor deposition facility. The U.S. Department of Energy purchased some of the dome in the 70s and converted it to a Strategic Petroleum Reserve. From 1980 to 1994, before being decommissioned, stored 72.5 million barrels of oil. The Weeks family lived Shadows-on-the-Teche, not far from the mine.
- West Grand Terre Island: Once part of East Grand Terre Island. After a hurricane in 1926, Grand Terre Island was split and separated by the Pass Abel.

Note: The five salt domes are known as "The Five Islands".

== Minnesota ==
- Baldwin Island
- Barrett Island
- Bear Island
- Campers Island
- Crane Island
- Deering Island, Lake Minnetonka
- Grey Cloud Island
- Latsch Island
- Nicollet Island
- Oak Island
- Pike Island
- Spirit Island, Lake Minnetonka
- Star Island, the island containing Lake Windigo

== Mississippi ==
- Cat Island
- Davis Island
- Deer Island
- Horn Island
- Petit Bois Island
- Ship Island

== Missouri ==
- Grand Tower Island
- Howell Island
- Nodaway Island
- Tower Rock

== Montana ==
- Cow Island
- Pirogue Island State Park
- Wild Horse Island
- Yorks Islands

== Nebraska ==
- Goat Island
- Grand Island
- McKissick Island

== Nevada ==
- Anaho Island
- Cottonwood Island
- Overton Islands
- Rock Island

== North Carolina ==
- Bald Head Island
- Bear Island
- Bird Island (lies on the coastal
  border with South Carolina)
- Bodie Island
- Bogue Banks
- Bunch of Hair
- Cedar Island
- Core Banks
- Figure Eight Island
- Gaylords Island
- Harkers Island
- Hatteras Island
- Holden Beach Island
- Knotts Island
- Masonboro Island
- Oak Island
- Ocean Isle
- Ocracoke Island
- Pea Island
- Pleasure Island
- Roanoke Island
- Shackleford Banks
- Sunset Beach Isle
- Topsail Island
- Wrightsville Beach

== North Dakota ==
- Grahams Island
- Gros Ventres Island – historical

== Ohio ==
- Kelleys Island
- Bass Islands

== Oklahoma ==
- Monkey Island

== Oregon ==
- A'eron Island
- Carpenters Island
- Coon Island
- Eighteenmile Island
- Goat Island
- Government Island
- Hayden Island
- McGuire Island
- Oregon Islands National Wildlife Refuge
- Ross Island
- Sauvie Island
- Tenasillahe Island
- Wizard Island

== South Carolina ==
- Capers Island
- Cedar Island
- Daufuskie Island
- Deveaux Bank
- Edisto Island
- Folly Island
- Fripp Island
- Goat Island
- Goat Island (Lake Wylie)
- Harbor Island
- Hilton Head Island
- Hunting Island
- Isle of Palms
- James Island
- Johns Island
- Kiawah Island
- Morris Island
- Parris Island
- Pawleys Island
- Pine Island
- Saint Helena Island
- Seabrook Island
- Sullivan's Island
- Wadmalaw Island
- Waties Island

== South Dakota ==
- Goat Island
- La Framboise Island

== Tennessee ==
- Geiger Island
- Goat Island
- Little Goat Island

== Utah ==
- Antelope Island
- Bird Island
- Carrington Island
- Cub Island
- Fremont Island
- Gunnison Island
- Stansbury Island
- The Island (Cache County, Utah)

== Virginia ==
- Assateague Island
- Brown's Island
- Belle Isle
- Chincoteague Island
- Tangier Island

== Wyoming ==
- Stevenson Island

== Insular areas ==
=== American Samoa ===
- Swains Island
- Ofu Island
- Ta‘ū Island
- Rose Atoll
- Pola Island
- Olosega Island
- Aunu‘u Island
- Tutuila Island

=== Guam ===
- Agrigan
- As-Gadao
- Cabras Island
- Cocos Island
- Fofos
- Guam

=== Northern Mariana Islands ===
- Rota
- Saipan
- Tinian
- Farallon de Pajaros
- Maug Islands
- Pagan Island
- Guguan
- Agrihan Island
- Sarigan Island
- Anatahan Island
- Asuncion Island
- Farallon de Medinilla
- Aguigan Island
- Alamagan Island
- Mañagaha Island
- Zealandia Bank

=== U.S. Minor Outlying Islands (uninhabited) ===
- Baker Island
- Howland Island
- Jarvis Island
- Johnston Atoll
  - Akau (North) Island
  - Hikina (East) Island
  - Johnston Island
  - Sand Island
- Kingman Reef
- Midway Atoll
  - Eastern Island
  - Sand Island
  - Spit Island
- Navassa Island
- Palmyra Atoll
  - Aviation Island
  - Bird Island
  - Bunker Island
  - Cooper–Meng Island
  - Eastern Island
  - Engineer Island
  - Holei Island
  - Home Islets
  - Kaula Island
  - Marine Island
  - Papala Island
  - Paradise Island
  - Pelican Island
  - Quail Island
  - Sand Island
  - Strawn Island
  - Tanager Island
  - Whippoorwill Island
- Wake Island
  - Peale Island
  - Wake Island
  - Wikes Island

=== Disputed ===
- Serranilla Bank
- Bajo Nuevo Bank
- Machias Seal Island

== See also ==
- Lists of islands
- List of islands of the Great Lakes
- Thousand Islands
- List of islands on the Potomac River
- List of islands of the United States by area
