= Queen Bess =

Queen Bess can refer to:

- Elizabeth I (1533–1603), Queen of England and Ireland
- Bessie Coleman (1892–1926), an early American civil aviator
- Queen Bess, Scunthorpe, a pub in England
- Queen Bess Island Wildlife Refuge, in Barataria Bay, Jefferson Parish, Louisiana, U.S.
- Queen Bess, a stack at Carnewas and Bedruthan Steps in Cornwall, England
- Mount Queen Bess, in British Columbia, Canada
