= Wax Lake =

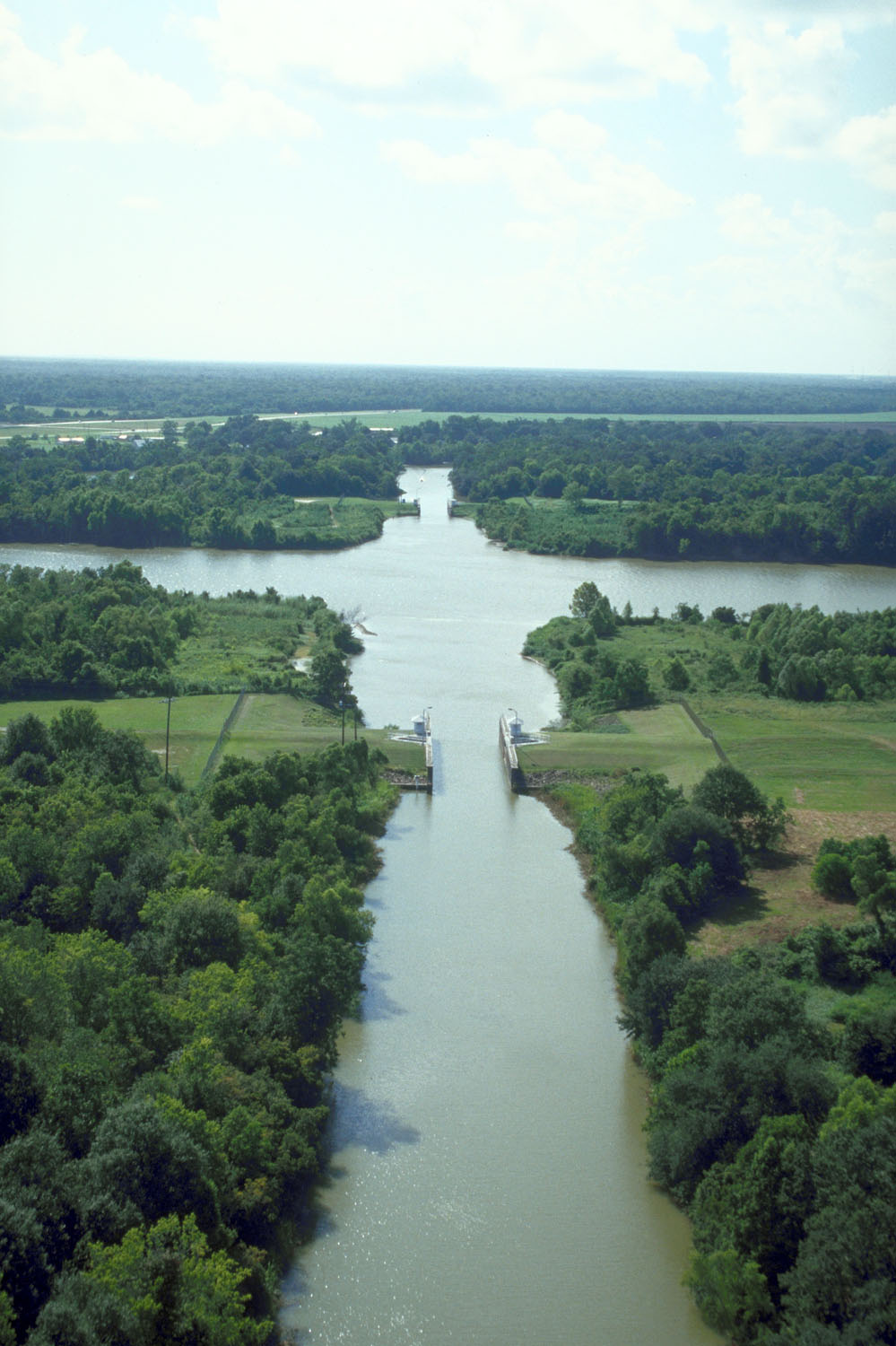
- Looking down the Bayou Teche to its intersection with the Wax Lake outlet near Patterson, Louisiana

- Location within Louisiana
- Interactive map of Wax Lake
- Location: St. Mary Parish, Louisiana
- Coordinates: 29.591°N 91.420°W
- Type: Former lake
- Part of: Bayou Teche
- Basin countries: United States

Wax Lake was a lake in St. Mary Parish, Louisiana that was converted into an outlet channel, the Wax Lake outlet, to divert water from the Atchafalaya River to the Gulf of Mexico.

== History ==
The history of the Wax Lake Outlet, as well as the 20,000 cfs "Charenton Drainage and Navigation Canal", the Avoca Island Cutoff (Avoca Island-Cutoff Bayou drainage channel), and to a lesser extent the Chene, Boeuf, and Black navigation channel, was to provide flood relief to the lower Atchafalaya Basin and Morgan City.

=== Wax Lake outlet ===
The Wax Lake outlet is an artificial channel that was created by the United States Army Corps of Engineers in 1942 to divert 30 percent of the flow from the Atchafalaya River to the Gulf of Mexico and reduce flood stages at Morgan City, Louisiana. The project design flood flow capacity for the outlet is 440,000 cu ft/s (12,000 m^{3}/s).

=== Construction ===
In a reversal of normal building procedures construction of the bridges began first, as well as the Bayou Teche floodgates at Calumet. Including the elevated roadways across the flood basin, and the Southern Pacific Railroad swing bridge in Baldwin as well as the three span K-truss bridge in Calumet, a total six bridges were built on dry land between Baldwin and Calumet. The dredging of the approximately 15 miles (24 km) of Wax Lake Outlet, that begins at Six Mile Lake (Yellow Bayou), and the "Charenton Drainage and Navigation Canal", that began at Bayou Teche in Baldwin, both started in 1941 and was completed in 1942.

== Wax Lake Delta ==
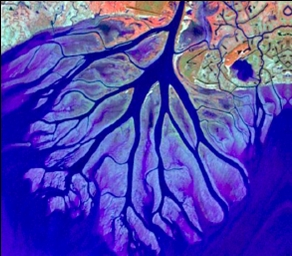
Aerial view of the Wax Lake Delta in 2005

The Wax Lake Delta is a river delta in Louisiana that was formed by rapid deposition of sediment following the creation of a canal through Wax Lake off of the Atchafalaya River in 1942. It is roughly 20 miles (32 km) southwest of Morgan City adjacent to the Atchafalaya delta.

It receives 34 million tons of sediment per year. In the 64 years between 1941 and 2005, Wax Lake was completely filled with sediment, and the delta prograded approximately 5 miles (8.0 km) into the sea.

The Wax Lake Delta's distributary channels form via deposition of mouth bars. The first branch to the west is Campground Pass and further south there are the three main branches, East Pass, Greg Pass, and Main Pass. The mid-channel is eroded and deposited downstream at the mouth of the river (usually during a period of higher water flow), which will create a new path of flow around it. There is then an added deposition upstream, thus causing the river to bifurcate. This results in the familiar dendritic pattern.

Because it was entirely created during an observable period and, other than the creation of the canal, was not altered by humans, it has often been in studies of deltaic formation. In the time since Hurricane Katrina, it has also served and as a model for delta regrowth in the Mississippi River Delta region in order to restore habitat and protect against storm surge.

== See also ==
- Atchafalaya Basin
