= Mississippi River Delta =

Delta of the Mississippi River

Coordinates: 29.6475°N 89.9149°W

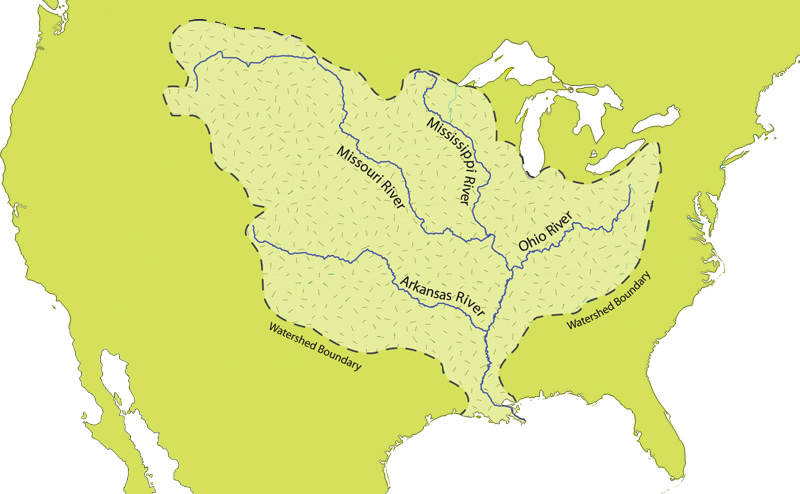
Map of the Mississippi River watershed

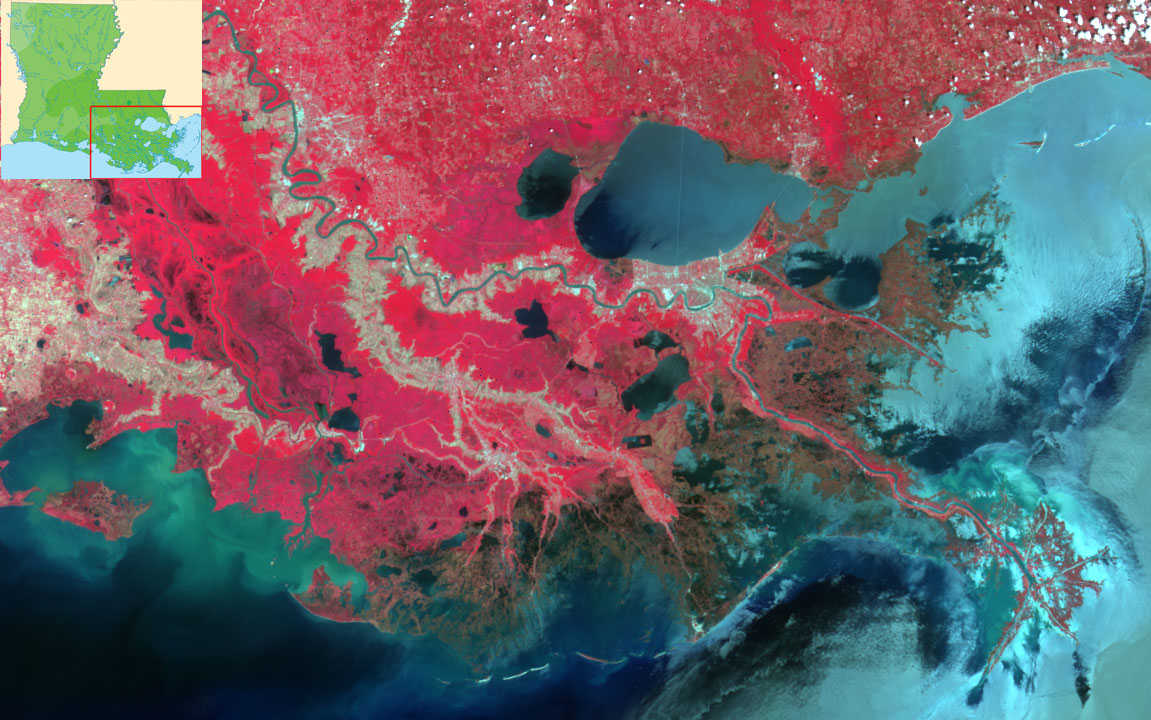
False-color image of the larger Mississippi River Delta, April 2000

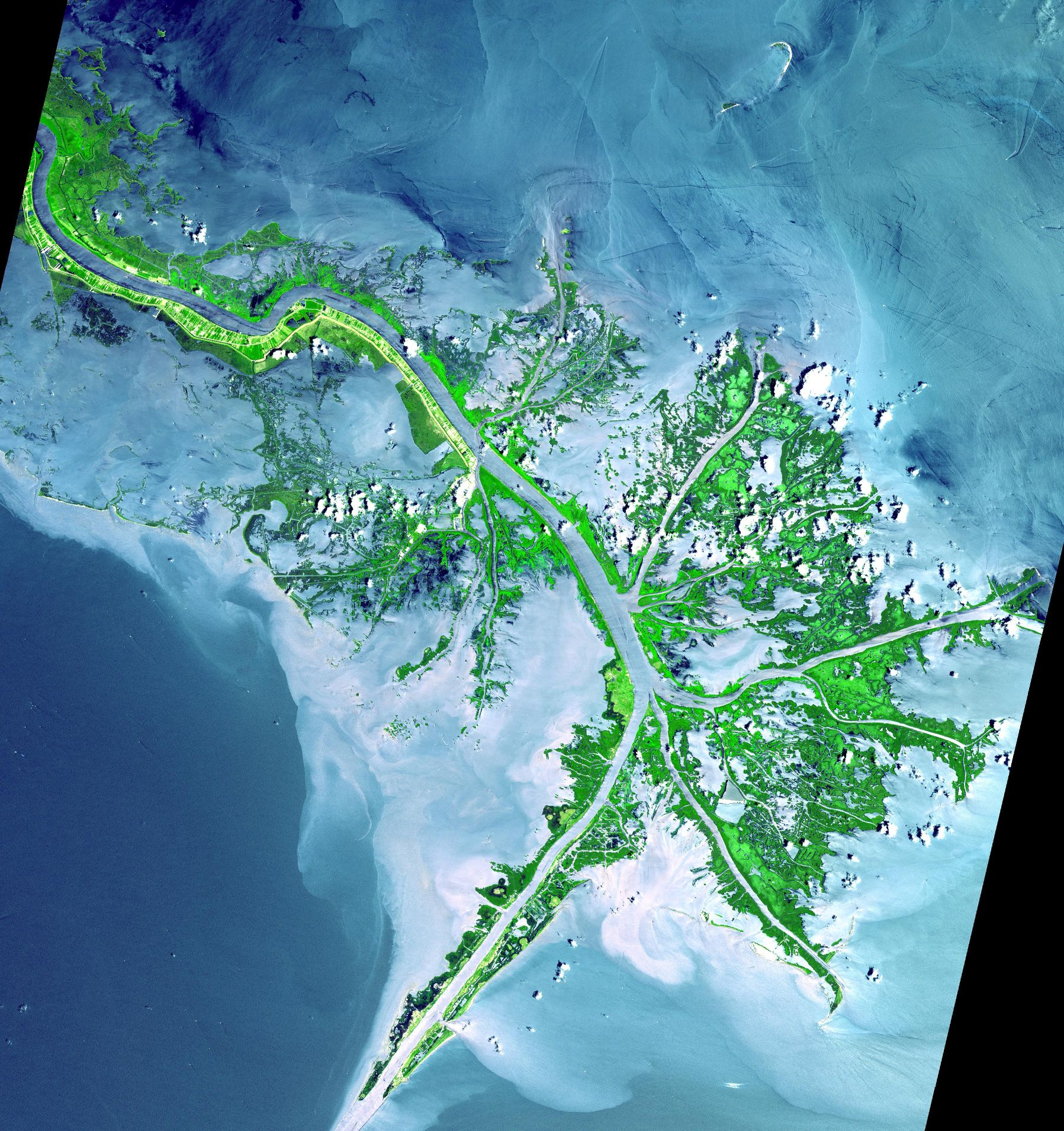
2001 image of the active delta front before Hurricanes Katrina and Rita destroyed much of the delta in 2005

The Mississippi River Delta is the confluence of the Mississippi River with the Gulf of Mexico in Louisiana, southeastern United States. The river delta is a three-million-acre (4,700 mi^{2}; 12,000 km^{2}) area of land that stretches from Vermilion Bay on the west, to the Chandeleur Islands in the east, on Louisiana's southeastern coast. It is part of the Gulf of Mexico and the Louisiana coastal plain, one of the largest areas of coastal wetlands in the United States. The Mississippi River Delta is the seventh-largest river delta on Earth (USGS) and is an important coastal region for the United States, containing more than 2.7 million acres (4,200 sq mi; 11,000 km^{2}) of coastal wetlands and 37% of the estuarine marsh in the conterminous U.S. The coastal area is the nation's largest drainage basin and drains about 41% of the contiguous United States into the Gulf of Mexico at an average rate of 470,000 cubic feet per second (3,500,000 US gal/s; 13,000 m^{3}/s).

== History and growth ==
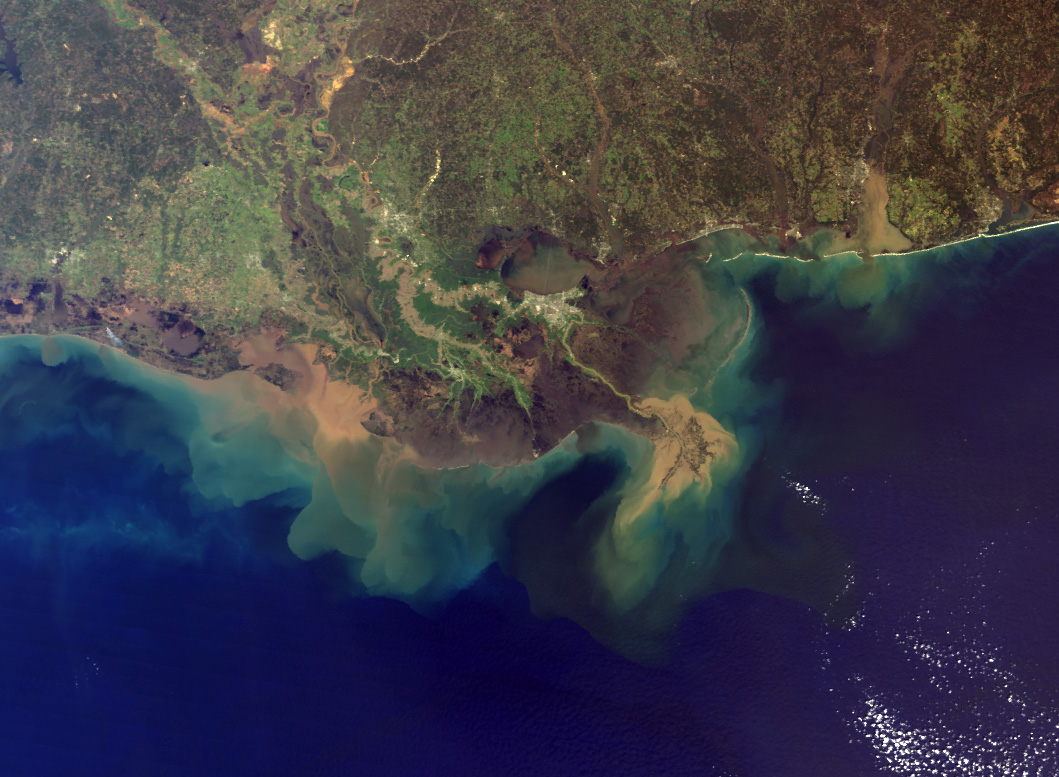
The Mississippi River Delta, showing the sediment plumes from the Mississippi and Atchafalaya Rivers, 2001.

The modern Mississippi River Delta formed over the last approximately 4,500 years as the Mississippi River deposited sand, clay and silt along its banks and in adjacent basins. The Mississippi River Delta is a river-dominated delta system, influenced by the largest river system in North America. The shape of the current birdfoot delta reflects the dominance the river exerts over the other hydrologic and geologic processes at play in the northern Gulf of Mexico. Prior to the extensive leveeing of the Mississippi River that began in the 1930s, the river avulsed its course in search of a shorter route to the Gulf of Mexico approximately every 1,000–1,500 years. The prehistoric and historic delta lobes of the Mississippi River Delta have influenced the formation of the Louisiana coastline and led to the production of over four million acres (6,200 sq mi; 16,000 km^{2}) of coastal wetlands.

As the river changed course, the natural flow of freshwater and sediment changed as well, resulting in periods of land building and land loss in different areas of the delta. This process by which the river changes course is known as avulsion, or delta-switching, and forms the variety of landscapes that make up the Mississippi River Delta.

The Atchafalaya River is the largest distributary of the Mississippi River and is also considered to be an influential part of the continual land-building processes within the Mississippi River Delta. The river's tributary channel was formed approximately 500 years ago and the Atchafalaya and Wax Lake deltas emerged around the middle of the twentieth century.

Starting with the earliest European settlement, people have struggled with the delta's natural cycle of floods, progradation, and transgression. Increased economic development and human habitation in the region created a desire to protect society from the threats posed by the river. Beginning in the 20th century, advances in technology and engineering allowed humans to alter the river in fundamental ways. Although these changes successfully shielded many people from danger and enabled significant economic development in the region, they have proven to have profoundly negative effects on the downstream delta.

== Geologic history ==
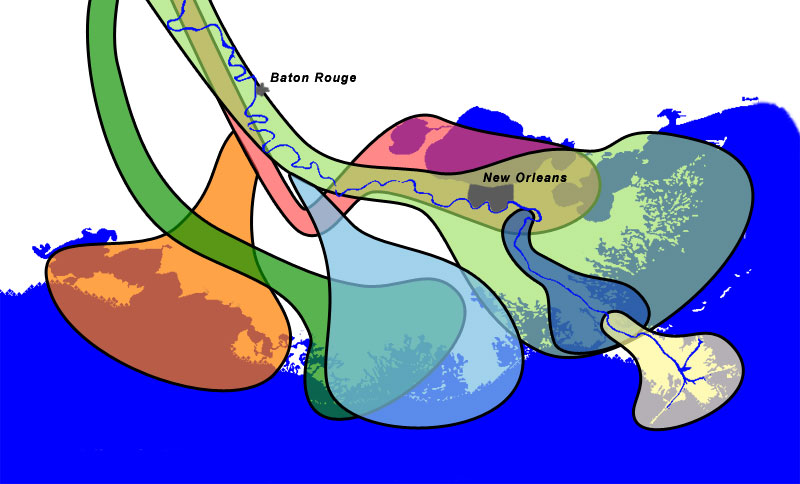
Mississippi Delta lobes.: Salé-Cypremort / 4,600 years BP; Cocodrie / 4,600–3,500 years BP; Teche / 3,500–2,800 years BP; St. Bernard / 2,800–1,000 years BP; Lafourche / 1,000–300 years BP; Plaquemine / 750–500 years BP; Balize / 550 years

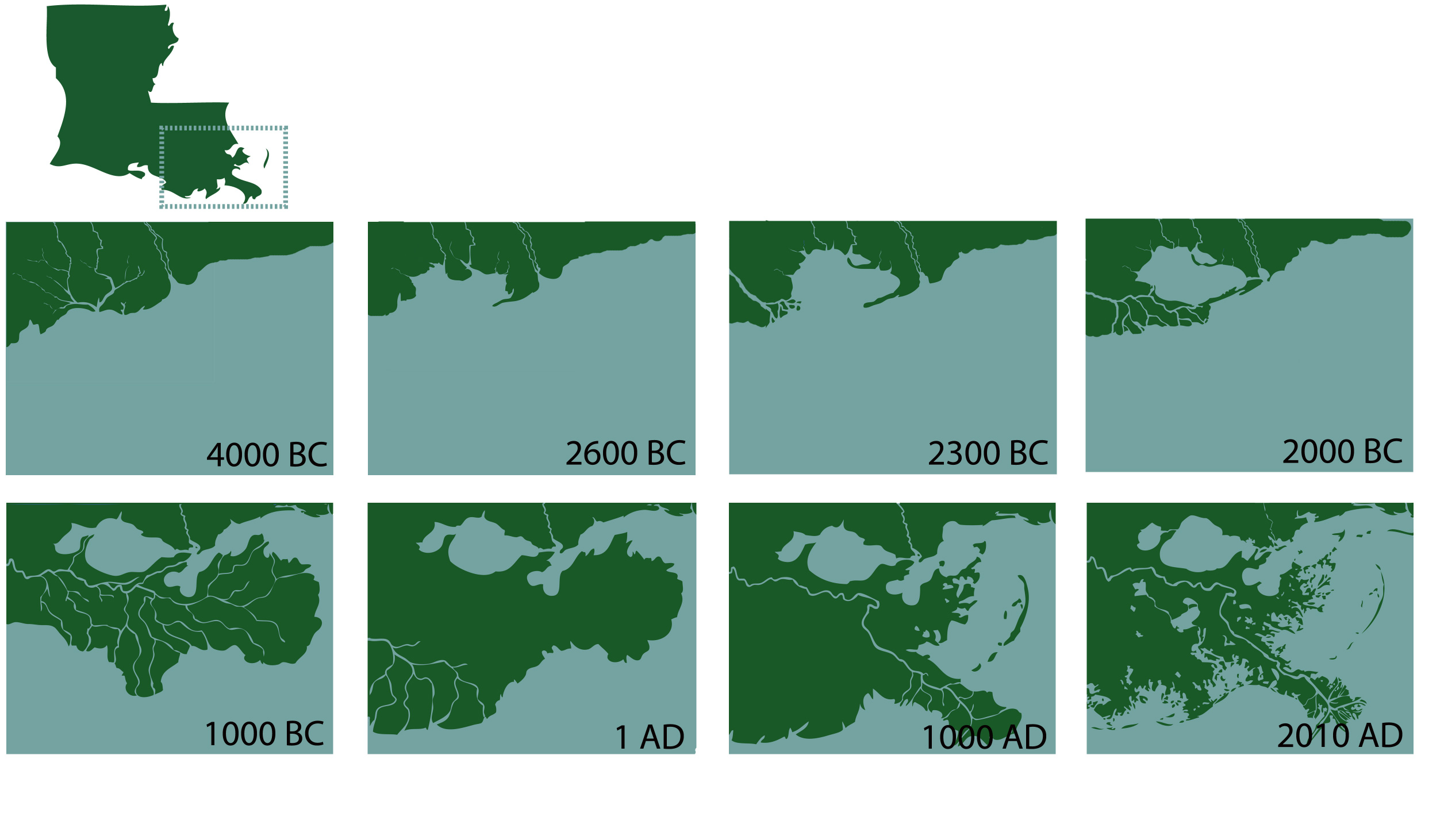
Coastal change in southeastern Louisiana.

The formation of the Mississippi River Delta can be traced back to the late Cretaceous Period, approximately 100 million years ago, with the formation of the Mississippi embayment. The embayment began focusing sediment into the Gulf of Mexico, which facilitated the deltaic land-building processes for the future. During the Paleogene Period (approx. 65.5 to 23 million years ago), a series of smaller scale, regional rivers entered present-day southern Louisiana allowing an increase in dispersion of sediment deposition into the delta region. The Mississippi embayment then became a primary focus of sediment deposition during the Miocene Epoch (approx. 23 to 5.3 million years ago), which built the foundation of the modern delta region. The modern day Mississippi River Delta plain began to evolve during the Holocene Epoch (around 7,500 to 8,000 years ago) due to the deceleration of sea level rise and the natural shifting of the river's course every 1,000–1,500 years.

The delta cycle refers to a dynamic process whereby the river deposits sediment at its outfall, growing a delta lobe, then eventually, seeking a shorter path to the sea, abandons its previous course and associated delta. After the river changes course and abandons the delta headland, the region experiences land loss due to the processes of subsidence, erosion of the marsh shoreline, and the natural redistribution of sands deposited along the delta that led to the formation of the barrier islands. The delta cycle contains the natural process of land loss and land gain, due to the directionality and discharge of the river. This process formed the bays, bayous, coastal wetlands, and barrier islands that make up the coastline of Louisiana.

The Mississippi River major deltaic cycle began over 7,000 years ago, eventually forming six delta complexes which are major depositional elements of a delta plain. The Mississippi River Delta complexes consist of smaller areas known as delta lobes, which contain the basins and other natural landscapes of the coastline.

The six Mississippi River Delta complexes are as follows:

1. The Maringouin delta formed 7,500 to 5,500 years ago when relative sea level rapidly rose.
2. The Teche delta formed 5,500 to 3,500 years ago after relative sea level rise decelerated.
3. The St. Bernard delta formed 4,000 to 2,000 years ago following an avulsion that caused the river's relocation to the east of present-day New Orleans.
4. The Lafourche delta formed 2,500 to 500 years ago from a second avulsion that caused the river to relocate to the west of present-day New Orleans.
5. Modern day development (over the past 1,500 years) formed the Plaquemines-Balize delta, also known as Bird's Foot Delta, between the St. Bernard and Lafourche delta.
6. Diversion to the Atchafalaya began 500 years ago with the Atchafalaya and Wax Lake Outlet deltas emerging in the mid-20th century. More recent influences created the most recent land building processes in the Wax Lake Outlet when the Wax Lake Outlet channel was created in 1942 to reduce water levels at Morgan City.

== Social, economic and cultural history ==
=== History ===
The mouth of the Mississippi River was encountered in 1519 by Alvarez de Pineda of Spain. Robert Cavelier de La Salle claimed the territory around the mouth of the Mississippi River for France in 1682, and the region grew with importance with its strategic location for trade and security.

In 1699 the French built their first crude fort at La Balize, on the Southeast Pass in Pass á Loutre, to control passage on the Mississippi. By 1721, they had built the wooden lighthouse-type structure (la balise means 'seamark' in French) that gave the settlement its name. Built in the marshes, the village was vulnerable to hurricane damage. In addition, ships had to deal with the shifting conditions of tides, currents, and mudflats through the mouth of the river. From 1700 to 1888, the main shipping channel was changed four times in response to shifting sandbars, mudflats, and hurricanes.

In 1803, the United States purchased Louisiana from Napoleon. During this period, the economic and political significance of New Orleans and the mouth of the Mississippi River increased, and it became an integral part of the nation's farming industries. Due to the influx of nutrient-rich soil from the Mississippi River, the delta is a prime area for the farming of sugar cane, cotton, and indigo—crops that were introduced into Louisiana farmlands during the pre-Civil War era. Many of these processes are important resources that the delta still provides today.

The importance of navigation and trade on the Mississippi only increased after the Civil War, and like the river itself, this economic development eventually flowed into the delta. In the 1870s, former delta swamplands were being transformed, via levee construction, into fertile farmland. Timber companies began harvesting lucrative forests and planters followed, taking advantage of the new agricultural opportunities. More railroads entered the area, replacing steamboats as the primary means of transporting the delta's rich natural bounty.

With the opening of the Panama Canal in 1914, the Mississippi River Delta became an even more important transportation artery. In addition to shipping, local and commercial fisheries continued to expand. The discovery of vast oil and gas deposits brought further economic and environmental changes to the delta. Despite these profound changes, the delta today remains very much rooted in the vibrant cultural and social traditions of its residents.

=== People ===
The Mississippi River Delta is home to more than two million people. The location of the delta at the mouth of the Mississippi River allowed for the area to be a cultural gateway into the United States, and influenced the mix of nationalities which settled in the area over time, forming the diversity of the region.

Louisiana's first 18th century colonists were French, but they were soon joined by Spanish and Acadian settlers. The region has been home to other European-immigrant ethnic groups, beginning in the 19th century, including German, Sicilian, and Irish. There are also the Africans, West Indians, and Native Americans in the mix. The combination of these groups over time has created the special culture found in the Mississippi River Delta, in which the Acadiana cultural region is located.

Two unique groups are the Creoles and the Cajuns. In general terms, Creole refers to a black, white, or mixed-race native of Louisiana. Creoles descended from the union of various ethnic groups in Louisiana, and they are often categorized according to their heritage. Creole populations before 1803 were typically born of French and/or Spanish parents; as such, they kept their European characteristics and cultures. A sub-group is known as the "Creoles of color", born of the mingling of African, European, and Native American identities. During the colonial period, the mixed-race Creoles were usually free from bondage, obtained an education, and often owned businesses and property.

The Cajuns are another ethnic group in southern Louisiana; they primarily consider themselves to be descendants of the Acadian settlers who were expelled from Nova Scotia by the British after the French and Indian War, when France lost its North American colonies. The Cajuns have intermarried with all ethnicities, profoundly influencing the culture of Louisiana. The Creole and Cajun cultures possessed distinct identities and remain strong influences in the Mississippi River Delta. They continue to shape preferences of food, music, and art, as well as to maintain the unique identities existing in the southernmost parts of the region. Both cultures speak a form of French; but they are considered to be autonomous and distinct dialects.

=== Culture ===
From 1910 to 1920, New Orleans became the birthplace of jazz and since has continued its legacy of being home to budding musicians and new musical experiences, tying music directly to its unique culture and diverse heritage. The origins of jazz and blues music in the region is closely connected to the Mississippi River and the delta, as the location allowed for an influx of cultural influences, including blues and bluegrass music from upriver, to the African and Latin folk hymns and music from the Caribbean islands. The delta is still synonymous with the sounds of jazz, funk and zydeco and remains to be an important cultural hub for new sounds and music, bringing thousands to the area every year to experience the lifestyle and participate in the natural rhythms of the area.

The region is also home to Cajun cuisine. Cajun food is defined by its use of ingredients widely available from the delta, including spices, shellfish, and grains from the delta's environment. Cajun culinary techniques and recipes continue to draw tourists to the region each year.

== Economy and ecology ==
The Mississippi River Delta provides an array of natural habitats and resources that benefit not only the state of Louisiana and coastal region, but also the entire nation. The coastal wetlands have a number of diverse landscapes that connect a variety of habitats to both the land and water.

Louisiana's wetlands are one of the nation's most productive and important natural assets. Consisting of natural levees, barrier islands, forests, swamps, and fresh, brackish, and saline marshes, the region is home to complex ecosystems and habitats that are necessary for sustaining its unique and vibrant nature. In addition to the environmental factors, the Mississippi River Delta also provides numerous economic resources and benefits that are unique to the region. These vital resources are at constant risk of being lost with the continual land loss and the decreasing size of the natural coastal area.

=== Economy ===
The Mississippi River Delta has a strong economy which relies heavily on tourism and recreational activities such as fishing, hunting and wildlife watching as well as commercial fishing, oil, gas, and shipping industries. There are a number of major industries in the Mississippi River Delta that drive the local and national economy, including:

==== Oil and gas ====
About one-sixth of the Louisiana workforce is employed in the oil and gas industry. Additionally, Louisiana is an important gateway for the nation's oil and gas supply, and in 2013 was surpassed only by Texas in total and operating refinery capacity. Port Fourchon in southern Louisiana services 90% of the offshore oil rigs in the Gulf of Mexico providing 16-18% of the country's oil supply. Natural gas is another commodity that provides a strong economic industry for the Mississippi River Delta. The first natural gas field was discovered in Louisiana in 1823 and has maintained an important role in the industry. Today, Louisiana produces over one-tenth of US natural gas supplies, contains almost 50,000 miles (80,000 km) of pipelines, and delivers gas to the entire nation from the Gulf of Mexico.

==== Shipping and ports ====
The Mississippi River Delta's ports are some of the most active and economically busy ports in the entire nation. Being at the mouth of the Mississippi River makes Louisiana's ports major entry points to the rest of the United States. Five of the U.S.'s largest ports are located in Louisiana, including Baton Rouge and New Orleans. The Port of South Louisiana is the largest port in the U.S. by tonnage and the fourth largest in the world, exporting more than 52 million tons a year of which more than half are agricultural products. It is estimated that Louisiana's river ports supply around 270,000 jobs and bring over $32.9 billion annually to the state's economy. In total, the Mississippi River moves about 500 million tons of cargo each year, which includes over 60% of the nation's grain exports. Louisiana's ports are an integral part of the United States' domestic and international shipping industry, sending and receiving over $100 billion per year in agricultural goods, machinery and other products including chemicals, coal, timber and steel, making Louisiana connected to a number of international destinations such as China, Japan and Mexico.

==== Fisheries ====
Both commercial and recreational fisheries are economically, culturally and historically important for the Louisiana coast. Fisheries provide a way of life for many who live on the southern coast of Louisiana. Louisiana has the second largest commercial fishery in the United States by weight, second only to Alaska. The Mississippi River Delta contains seven of the top 50 seafood landing ports in the United States, three of which (Empire-Venice, Intracoastal City and Cameron) are in the top six for seafood landing ports nationwide. The gulf region provides 33% of the nation's seafood harvest, and commercial fishing is a $2.4 billion industry in the Gulf of Mexico with about 75% of the fish landed coming through Louisiana ports.

==== Tourism ====
Louisiana offers various activities throughout the Mississippi River Delta, including recreational fishing, hunting, swamp tours, and local seafood restaurants. The region's cultural events also draw thousands of visitors annually.

In total, the five Gulf Coast states generate around $34 billion annually in tourism. The recreational wildlife tourism industry is an important component of the tourism sector for the Mississippi River Delta and the Gulf Coast. The report, "Wildlife Tourism and the Gulf Coast Economy," shows how wildlife tourism is a vital industry, bringing in more than $19 billion in annual spending by tourists and generating more than $5 billion in federal, state and local tax revenue.

=== Ecology ===
The Mississippi River Delta has an extremely diverse ecological landscape, consisting of a number of wildlife habitats and vegetation. The coastal landscape of the Mississippi River Delta is rich in resources and contains some of the most unusual areas in the United States. In addition to providing habitats for wildlife living in the region, the Mississippi River Delta's wetlands, marshes and barrier islands also provide the vital protection for coastal residents and communities from storm surge and flooding.

==== Landscapes ====
Below is a list of the variation of landscapes that comprise the Mississippi River Delta:

1. Fresh, intermediate, brackish and saline marshlands make up more than three million acres (4,700 sq mi; 12,000 km^{2}) of Louisiana's coastline, or 13% of the state's total landmass.
2. Barrier islands are home to a number of birds and provide the first buffer of protection for Louisiana residents from hurricane storm surge.
3. Swamps are forested wetlands. The biggest swamp along the Mississippi River Delta is 1 million acres and located in the Atchafalaya Basin.
4. Bottomland hardwood forests and maritime forests
5. Beaches
6. Coastal flatwoods
7. Southwest Louisiana's ecosystem originally consisted of 2.5 million acres (3,900 sq mi; 10,000 km^{2}) of coastal tallgrass prairie habitat (Western Gulf coastal grasslands), but much of it has been replaced by cattle ranching and farming.

==== Wildlife ====
The variation of landscapes in the Mississippi River Delta provides the habitats, living conditions and migratory locations for hundreds of species of animals, birds and other wildlife. Many of these species are unique to the Mississippi River Delta and rely on the mix of wetland, marsh and forest ecosystems within the region.

A variety of mammals rely on the habitats that the delta provides, from forests to swamps to estuaries. These areas are home to Louisiana black bears, bottlenose dolphins, minks, beavers, armadillos, foxes, coyotes and bobcats. The region also supports a number of invasive mammals, such as nutria and feral hogs, which destroy native ecosystems – including coastal wetlands – and cause trouble for native species.

The delta is a vital stopping point along the Mississippi Flyway. The flyway stretches from southern Ontario to the mouth of the Mississippi River, and contains one of the longest migration routes in the Western Hemisphere. About 460 bird species have been recorded in Louisiana, with 90% (300 species) found within the coastal wetlands. Many diverse and rare species including indigo buntings, scarlet tanagers, yellow-crowned night herons and bald eagles call Louisiana home. Also found in the Mississippi River Delta are great egrets, glossy ibises, roseate spoonbills, wintering hummingbirds, birds of prey and wood storks.

==== Fish ====
Delta wetlands provide fish habitats and act as nurseries for a number of important juvenile fish species. Ninety-seven percent of the gulf's commercial fish and shellfish species spend some portion of their lives in coastal wetlands, like those found in coastal Louisiana. A few examples of fish found in the delta are speckled trout, redfish, flounder, blue crabs, shrimp, catfish and bass.

==== Endangered and threatened species ====
The Mississippi River Delta is home to a number of species that are listed as endangered or threatened according to the U.S. Fish and Wildlife Service's Delta National Wildlife Refuge. Continuous land loss and wetland erosion poses a serious risk to the habitats and the survival of these species, including the:

- Piping plover (Charadrius melodus)
- Kemp's Ridley Turtle (Lepidochelys kempii)
- Louisiana black bear

== Threats ==
Throughout its geological history, the Mississippi River Delta experienced natural processes of growth and retraction as a result of sediment deposition from the river. However, in recent history, the processes of land loss have far surpassed the river's land-building properties due to a number of factors. Some of the causes of delta land loss stem from natural causes, like hurricanes and other effects of climate change. However, the Mississippi River Delta also suffers from a lack of sedimentation due to dams, levee systems, navigation canals, and other man-made structures in the Mississippi basin. These structures have proven to be detrimental to the natural land-building power of the river as many of the structures slow or eliminate the river's flow into certain areas, increasing salt-water intrusion from the Gulf of Mexico into freshwater wetlands. The salt water weakens these freshwater ecosystems, making them more vulnerable to destruction by hurricanes and unable to withstand heavy storm surge. To better understand these problems, the LSU Center for River Studies has built a 90 by 120 foot physical model of the Lower Mississippi River Delta to simulate water flow and sediment displacement.

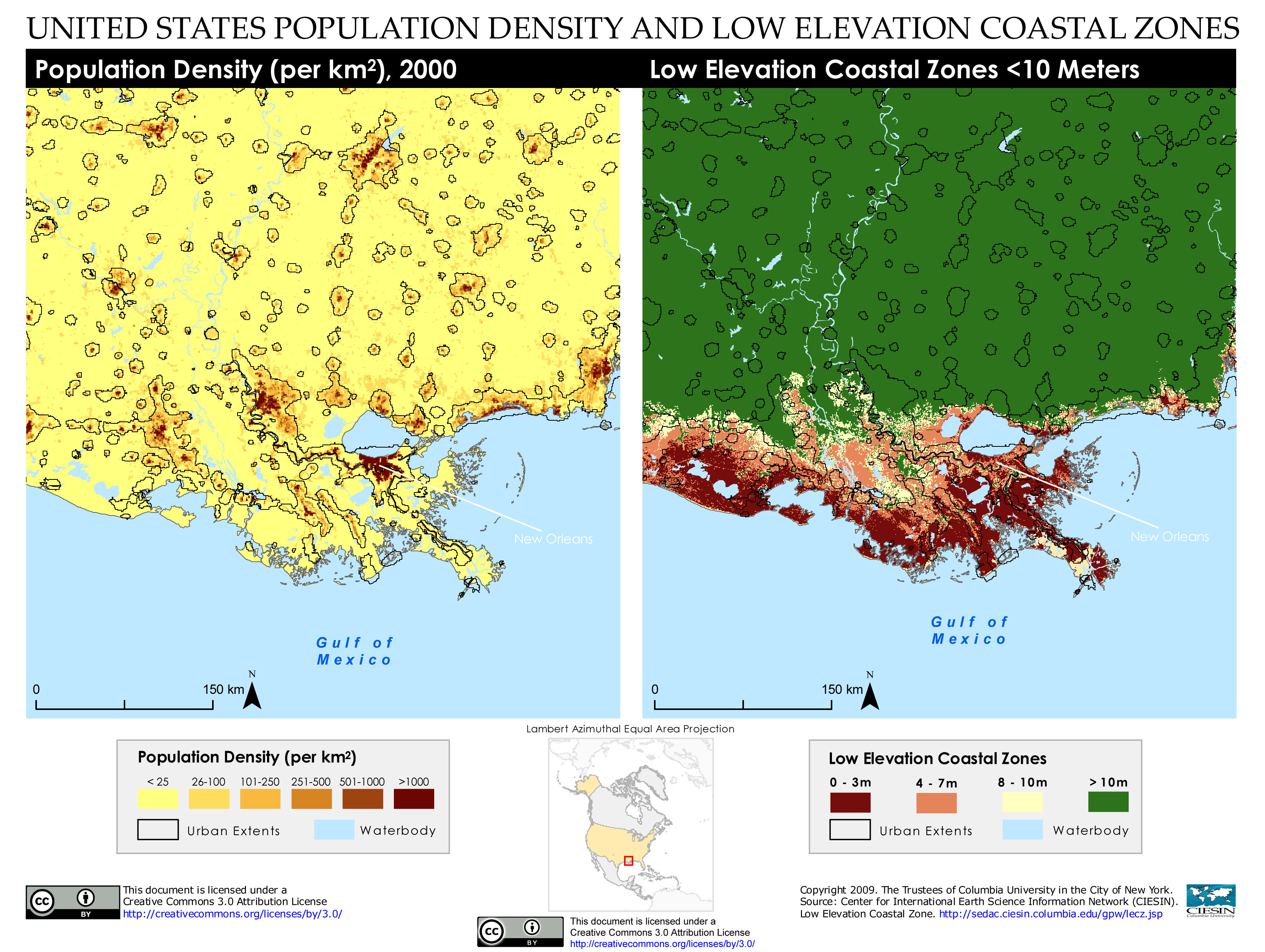
Population density and low-elevation coastal zones in the Mississippi River Delta. The Mississippi River Delta is especially vulnerable to sea level rise.

=== Subsidence ===
In the absence of riverine sediment inputs to counteract it, net subsidence in the Mississippi River Delta occurs at a much faster rate than in other areas of the United States. Researchers suggest that subsidence may be further exacerbated through fluid extraction by the gas and oil industry.

=== Hurricanes and storms ===
Coastal wetlands and barrier islands are the first line of protection for Louisiana communities and cities from hurricanes and storm surge. However, as these landscapes are weakened, they become more vulnerable to strong winds and flooding. For example, following Hurricanes Katrina and Rita in 2005, approximately 200 square miles (130,000 acres; 520 km^{2}) of wetlands became open water, demonstrating permanent wetland loss.

=== Sea level rise ===
A combination of subsidence, hurricanes and storms and sea level rise leads to increases in marsh and wetlands loss. Climate change also has effects on the strength of the coastline. As global sea levels rise, the areas within the Mississippi River Delta that experience subsidence may permanently flood and become open water. Additionally, the lack of sediment into these flooded areas also exacerbates the rate at which sea level rise affects the region.

=== Levees ===
Levees were primarily built along the river for flood protection and to provide stabilization of the shoreline, allowing for more reliable navigation. Levees were built prior to 1927, but a majority came after the 1927 river flood when the Flood Control Act of 1928 authorized the Mississippi River and Tributaries Project. Through this project, a system of levees, floodways, and basin and channel improvement were built to improve flood protection for residents and communities from the river's overspill, and has been largely successful in preventing flood damage over the decades. This system has mitigated extensive flooding and has saved the region billions in potential damage. As such, it is regarded as "the most successful and cost-effective public works projects in the history of the United States." This success, however, has come at a high cost for the region's natural landscapes and ecosystems, as the levees sever the connection between the river and surrounding wetlands. The freshwater and sediment carried by the river is the fuel needed for land growth within the delta, but the levees block this process, cutting off the deposition of sediment in most areas of the delta.

=== Navigation, gas and oil canals ===
Throughout the 1960s and 1980s, activity for oil and gas exploration in the Gulf of Mexico and along the Louisiana coastline increased. Dredging canals was seen as a necessity for these companies to create deeper channels for easier navigation and the laying of pipelines. Over time, 10 major navigation canals and more than 9,300 miles of pipelines were placed throughout coastal Louisiana, which currently serve around 50,000 oil and gas production facilities. The impact of dredging and pipeline placement results in the direct loss of wetlands, and according to a report filed by the Department of the Interior, these actions accounted for 30 to 59% of wetland loss in Louisiana from 1956 to 1978.

The process of dredging also contributes to more serious damage occurring over longer-term periods of time through the disruption of the natural hydrology of the region. Although these canals and pipelines serve a vital resource to the entire nation, they have increased the erosion and degradation of the Mississippi River Delta by facilitating the creation of open water areas that allow for salt water penetration into freshwater wetlands. The dredging and oil and gas developments in the region affect the quality of water and drastically change the hydrology of the wetlands, depleting nutrients and sediments necessary for the survival and vitality of these areas.

The Mississippi River Gulf Outlet (MRGO) is an example of wetland loss caused by a navigation channel. Built in the 1960s between the Gulf of Mexico and the Port of New Orleans, it has contributed to the destruction of 27,000 acres of wetlands, allowing for salt water to enter freshwater ecosystems. It is also believed to have served as a "funnel" for Hurricane Katrina storm surge and contributed to a drastic increase of flooding in St. Bernard and the Lower Ninth Ward in New Orleans.

=== Upriver dams ===
Dams and reservoirs in the upper drainage basin of the river, primarily on the sediment-rich Missouri river, have decreased the sediment load of the lower Mississippi River. These structures block and trap the river's land-building sediment, cutting the replenishing nutrients and minerals needed for the stability and survival of the delta's unique ecosystems. Since the 1950s, these structures have reduced the sediment load by almost half.

== Restoration ==
The Mississippi River took thousands of years to build its delta, but land loss is occurring at a much faster pace. A number of steps have been taken over the past decade to increase the resiliency of coastal Louisiana. Research has been conducted in order to find the most feasible and effective restoration projects to mitigate further land loss and to implement rebuilding processes for the delta. Studies have conservatively estimated that without sediment input, 4,000–5,000 square miles (10,000–13,000 km^{2}) of the Mississippi Delta may be submerged by 2100, indicating a need for directed restoration efforts. Projects to counteract this include:

=== Louisiana Coastal Area (LCA) 6 ===
These projects are authorized through the Water Resources Development Act of 2007 (WRDA 2007), which authorizes flood control, navigation, and environmental projects and studies by the Army Corps of Engineers. Some of the important LCA Projects include:

1. The Mississippi River Gulf Outlet (MRGO) Ecosystem Restoration Plan: After Hurricane Katrina, the damage caused and directly related to the Mississippi River–Gulf Outlet Canal prompted the U.S. Army Corps of Engineers to develop an ecosystem restoration plan that included closing the channel. The plan guidelines fell under WRDA 2007 and include habitat rebuilding through marsh, swamp and oyster reef restorations, as well as wetland ecosystem restorations using freshwater diversions and the construction of other structures designed to strengthen the coastline.

2. River diversions: These projects undergo significant amounts of research and are specifically engineered, designed and strategically constructed to achieve their intended purpose, be it to convey sediment to adjacent marshes or to increase freshwater flow to marshes. Sediment diversions can be located, constructed and operated in such a way that they maximize the sediment carried through the diversion to the sediment starved wetlands of the receiving basin. The diversions can form new land and strengthen the existing wetlands. A few examples in the Mississippi River Delta are the West Bay and Mid-Barataria diversions. River diversions are an example of a sedimentation enhancing strategy.

3. Redirecting sediment: The Atchafalaya River Basin is a river swamp that has an overabundance of sediment. This basin contains the largest tract of naturally built new marsh in the state. It has been proposed that sediment from the Atchafalaya River could be used to sustain the Louisiana coast. Delta growth in this basin occurred from 1952 to 1962, and then again in the 1973 Mississippi River flood. The 1973 growth is known as the Wax Lake Outlet. This specific area has grown each year since 1973 to its present size of 11.3 square miles.

=== 2012 Louisiana Coastal Master Plan for a Sustainable Coast ===
The state's Coastal Protection and Restoration Authority (CPRA) brought together national and international scientists and engineers to create a $50-billion, 50-year plan to save Louisiana's coast. A CPRA-supported report noted that a social impact assessment was an important step to take before moving forward, but no such assessment took place. Regardless, the plan was unanimously approved by the legislature in May 2012 and outlines 109 projects that intends to bring long-term benefits, resiliency and sustainability to the communities and ecosystems along the coast. Within the plan there are projects that vary in size and impact, including, hydrologic restoration, sediment diversions, barrier island restoration and marsh creation projects. Some of the projects are already underway, but many of them still need further approval and funding authorization.

- River Diversions: These projects are specifically characterized for their ability to reconnect the river to the delta and are designed to mimic the natural processes of sediment dispersion and delta growth. Examples of these types of projects are already underway including the Mid-Barataria Sediment Diversion. Located in Plaquemines Parish, Louisiana, this is identified as a critical restoration project by the LCA and would combine a "medium diversion with dedicated dredging" to achieve its intended results. The project would address the land loss in the Barataria Basin and bring sustainability and strength to the wetlands, preventing future loss and preserving critical ecosystems in the region. The project was met with resistance from locals, including residents of Ironton, a historic African American community located near the diversion. They are worried about both the freshwater pouring into the estuary from the Mississippi River and its effect on commercial fisheries in the area, as well as the addition of several feet of water in the wetlands, posing risks during storms and flooding events. Those who have lived on the land for generations are also skeptical of the plan's motives, claiming that previous scientific endeavors (ex. Bohemia Spillway) have been racially motivated, leaving their community as well as other Black and immigrant communities in the area broken or erased from history. At a meeting with the Louisiana Coastal Protection and Restoration Authority (CPRA), a resident of Ironton shared her thoughts with officials:
  "We understand that the scientists say [Ironton] is an ideal area. But someone needs to say, a mile south is a community. We need some humanity... Why us? Why always us? Everything negative is next to a black community. Sediment is not bad but we're hoping someone can be an advocate for us."
- Relations between coastal scientists and Black oystermen have been disenchanted by a history of discriminatory practices against the oystermen. In the 1970s, the Louisiana Department of Wildlife and Fisheries banned the use of hand dredges for oystering, and the oystermen saw this as "a case of blatant racial discrimination operating under the guises of environmental protection." This ban came at a time when these Black oystermen were gaining autonomy in their work and income by using smaller, personal hand dredges to escape low-wage commercial fishing jobs. They fought against the ban in court arguing that it was a discriminatory law and it was overturned.

=== Bohemia Spillway ===
In 1926, the Bohemia Spillway was proposed as an engineering experiment attempting to create a mechanism to assist levees with controlling high water events. Eleven miles (18 km) of levee were removed at this location, newly purchased land down the river from New Orleans. This second outlet for the Mississippi river was effective at mitigating flooding upstream during the Great Mississippi Flood of 1927. The acquisition of this land impacted the small Black and immigrant communities living on the land at the time who were forcefully relocated under "threat of expropriation" and at gunpoint. This was documented in newspaper reports that residents were fully compensated for the loss of their land by the Orleans Levee Board, but this has been reviewed in legal cases and proved false. It was later revealed that this land was also the site of $43 million worth of oil and gas revenues as of the 1980s, giving residents reason to believe the true motive behind the Bohemia Spillway project was to acquire the oil, not for the sake of science. This history of deceit and marginalization and has led to a communal distrust in scientists, and consequently, the Mid-Barataria Sediment Diversion project.

=== RESTORE Act ===
The Resources and Ecosystems Sustainability, Tourist Opportunities and Revived Economies of the Gulf Coast States Act (RESTORE Act) was passed by Congress as part of the Transportation Reauthorization Act on June 29, 2012, and was signed into law by the President Barack Obama on July 7, 2012. This law followed the BP Deepwater Horizon oil spill of 2010 and ensures that 80 percent of the civil Clean Water Act fines paid by BP and the other responsible parties are directed to the Gulf Coast Ecosystem Restoration Council and five Gulf Coast states to use for environmental and economic restoration.

== See also ==
- Mississippi Valley Division of the United States Army Corps of Engineers
