= Silver Dollar Island =

Island in Colorado

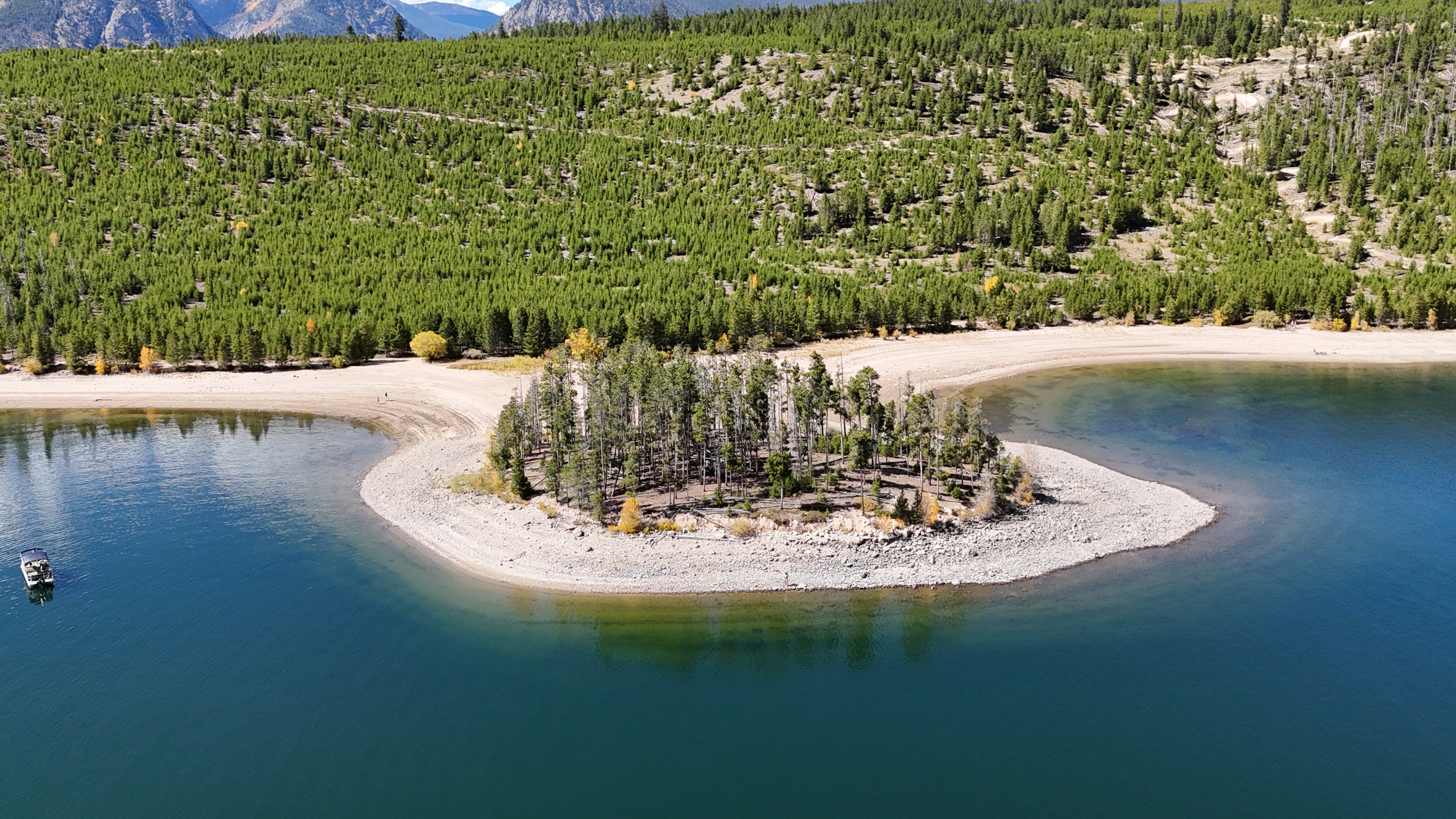
- Aerial photo of Silver Dollar Island, September 2024

- Location within Colorado Location within the United States

Geography
- Location: Colorado
- Coordinates: 39.5833199°N 106.0564078°W

Administration
- United States
- State: Colorado
- County: Summit County

Silver Dollar Island is a small island in Summit County, Colorado. It is in the Blue River arm of the Dillon Reservoir, east of the Frisco Peninsula. Its coordinates are 39.5833199°N 106.0564078°W and it sits at an elevation of 2,750 meters. It appears on a 1970 USGS map of the area, along with Sentinel Island and Fishhook Island. The island is generally accessible by land via a small sand spit.

== See also ==
- List of islands of Colorado
