= Fishhook Island =

Island in Colorado

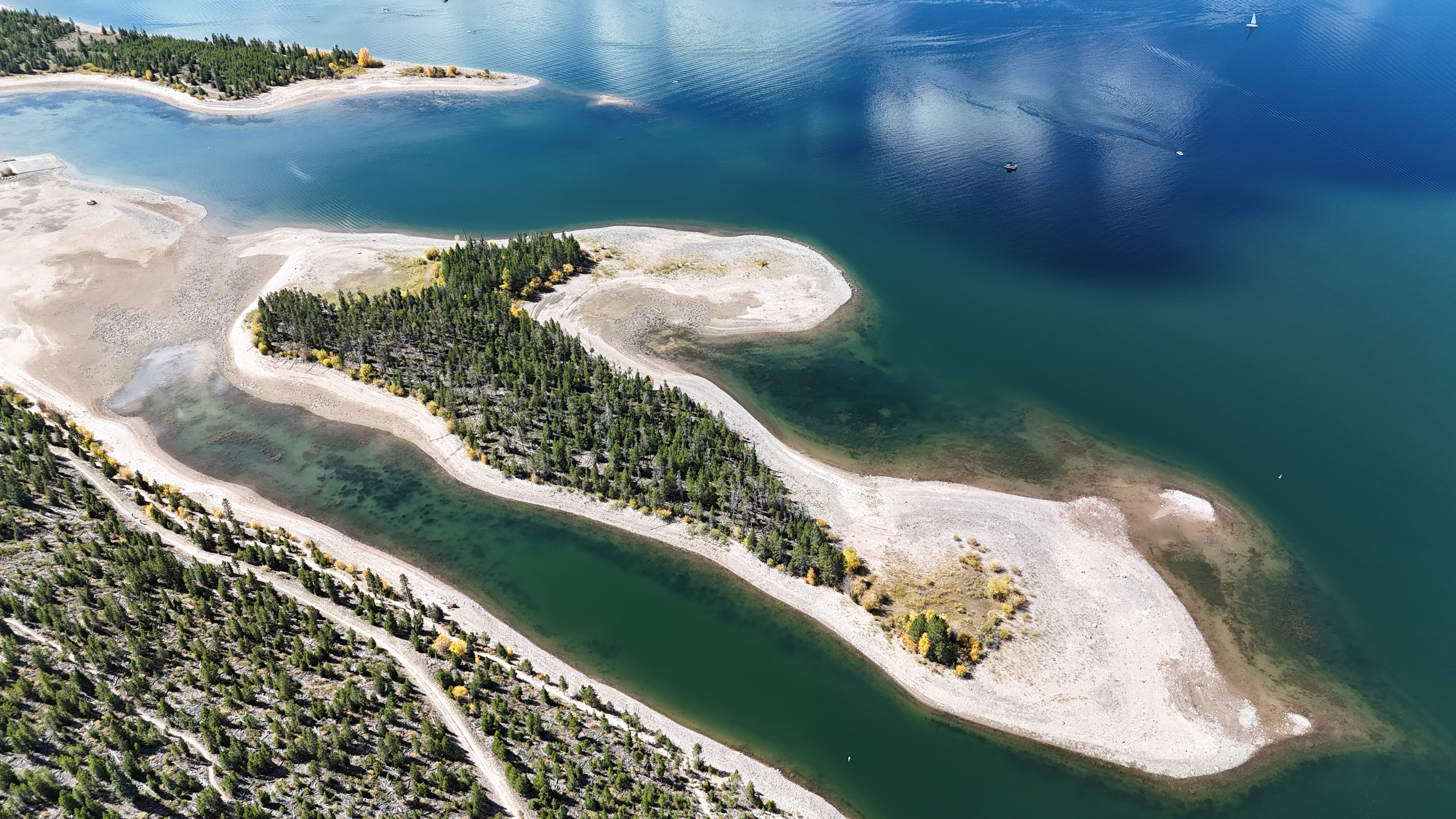
- Aerial photo of Fishhook Island, September 2024

- Location within Colorado Location within the United States

Geography
- Location: Colorado
- Coordinates: 39.5919309°N 106.0680750°W

Administration
- United States
- State: Colorado
- County: Summit County

Fishhook Island is a small island in Summit County, Colorado in the Dillon Reservoir. It appears on a 1970 USGS map of the area, along with Silver Dollar Island and Sentinel Island.

== See also ==
- List of islands of Colorado
