= Monkey Island (Denver) =

Island in Colorado

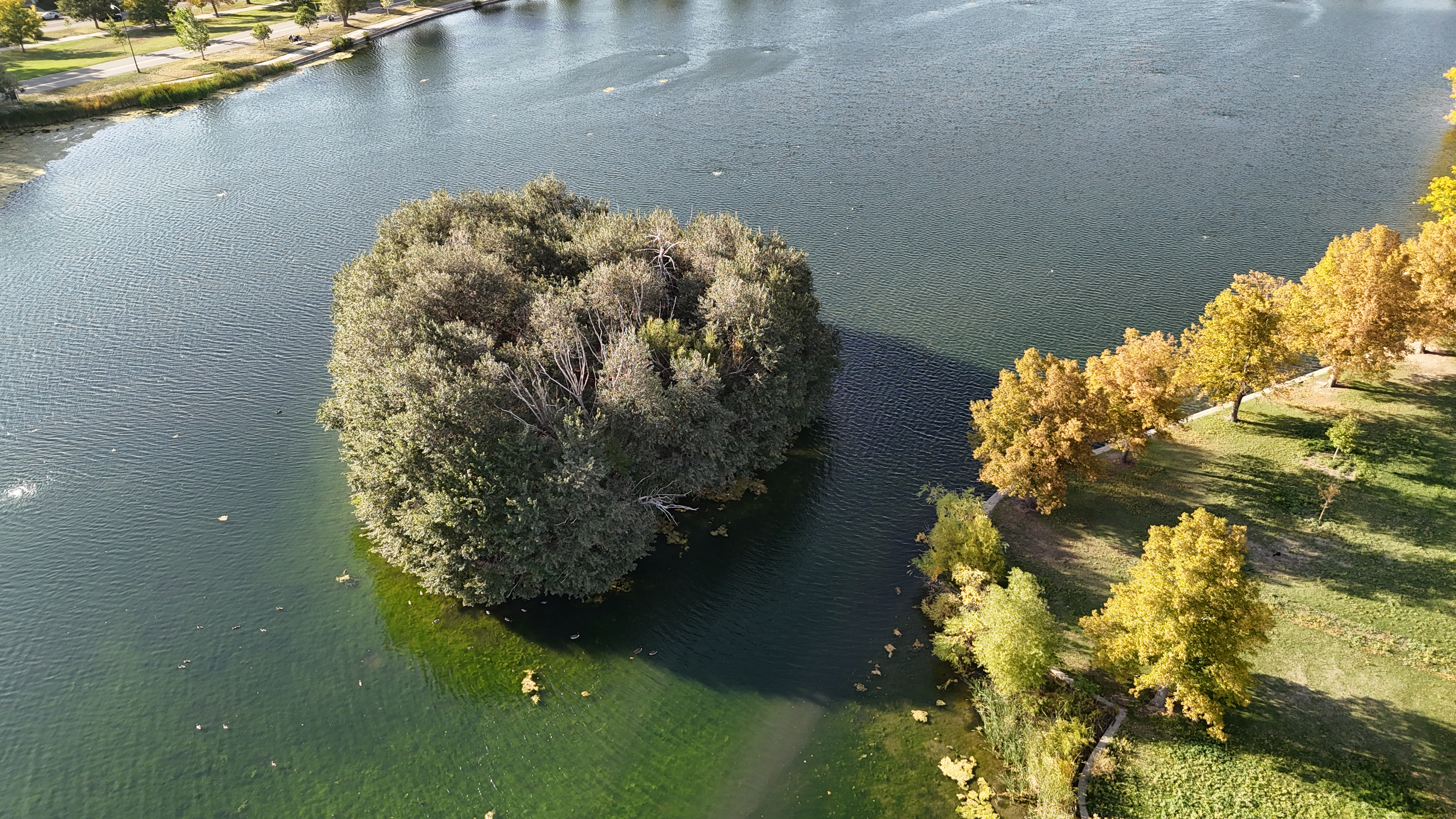
- Aerial view of Monkey Island, Denver, Colorado, taken on September 30, 2024.

- Location within Colorado Location within the United States

Geography
- Location: Colorado
- Coordinates: 39.695025°N 104.971490°W

Administration
- United States
- State: Colorado
- County: Denver

Monkey Island is a small island in Grasmere Lake in Washington Park in Denver. It has existed since the man-made lake was dug and filled in 1906. The island, however, wouldn't earn its name until the 1960s when it became a lentic lovers' lane punctuated with recreational drug use common to the era. Locals described it as an island for monkey business and henceforth called it Monkey Island. While the island was once connected to the shore of the lake, the bridge was removed in the 1970s to discourage such behavior. In the 2000s, further visual deterrence was added when the water source for the lake was switched from the Platte River to recycled wastewater. The later source has caused an abundance of algal blooms in the lake surrounding the island due it's high concentrations of nitrogen and phosphorus, whereas historically the Platte River-sourced water left it appearing cleaner. Efforts began in 2011 to improve the lake's overall water quality.

According to local legend, a habitué of the island in the 1960s, Beatrice Haven, a.k.a. Miss B. Haven, who died unexpectedly in her 20s, is said to haunt it. As the story goes, she appears late at night to boys who venture onto the island, until the squawking of the island birds, such as the night herons that currently inhabit it, causes her to disappear.

== See also ==
- List of islands of Colorado
