= Sentinel Island (Colorado) =

Island in Colorado

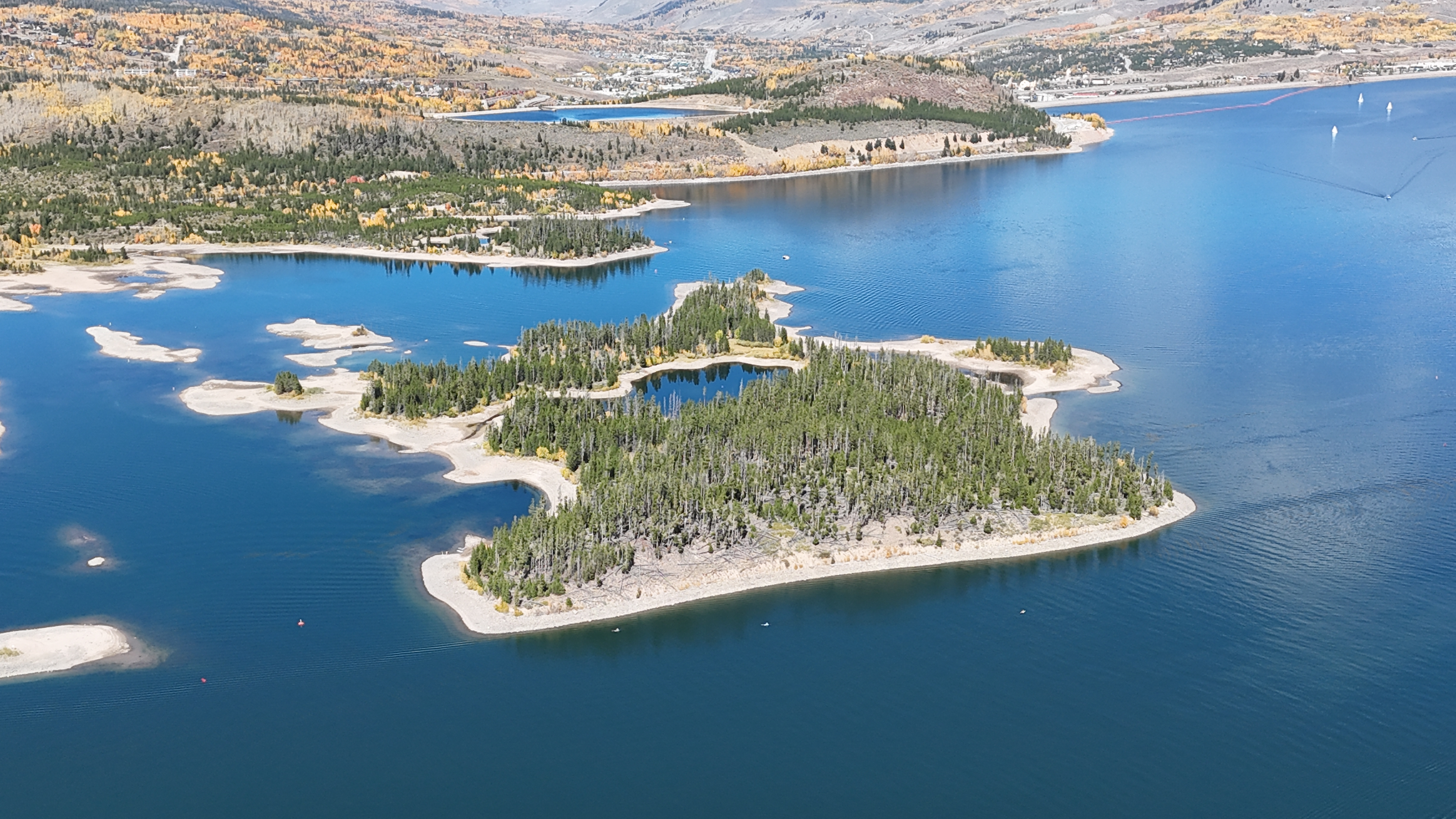
- Aerial photo of Sentinel Island, September 2024

- Location within Colorado Location within the United States

Geography
- Location: Colorado
- Coordinates: 39.5997087°N 106.0658527°W

Administration
- United States
- State: Colorado
- County: Summit County

Sentinel Island is a small island in Summit County, Colorado in the Dillon Reservoir. It appears on a 1970 USGS map of the area, along with Silver Dollar Island and Fishhook Island.

== See also ==
- List of islands of Colorado
