= Overton Islands (Nevada) =

Group of Islands in USA

Coordinates: 36°15′59″N 114°23′29″W

The Overton Islands are a small chain of islands in Lake Mead, Nevada, in the Lake Mead National Recreation Area. The islands are located in the Overton Arm of the lake, about four miles southeast of Echo Bay. The largest island is less than a mile in length.
