= Bunch of Hair =

Island in the United States of America

Coordinates: 34.658177°N 76.553259°W

Bunch of Hair is an island in Carteret County, North Carolina, in the United States.

According to one source, Bunch of Hair might have been intended as a soothing name for an inhospitable place.
