= Breton National Wildlife Refuge =

Nature reserve in Louisiana, US

- IUCN category IV (habitat/species management area)
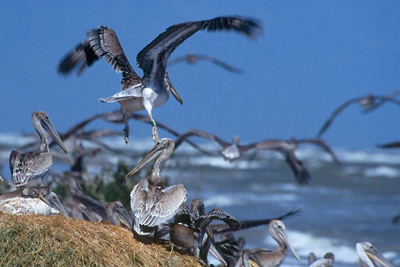

- Location within the United States
- Location: St. Bernard / Plaquemines parishes, Louisiana, United States
- Nearest city: New Orleans, Louisiana
- Coordinates: 29.8349239°N 88.8305806°W
- Area: 13,000 acres (53 km^{2})
- Established: 1904
- Governing body: U.S. Fish and Wildlife Service
- Website: Breton National Wildlife Refuge

Breton National Wildlife Refuge

Breton National Wildlife Refuge is located in southeastern Louisiana in the offshore Breton Islands and Chandeleur Islands. It is located in the Gulf of Mexico and is accessible only by boat. The refuge was established in 1904 through executive order of President Theodore Roosevelt and is the second-oldest refuge in the National Wildlife Refuge System.

== History ==
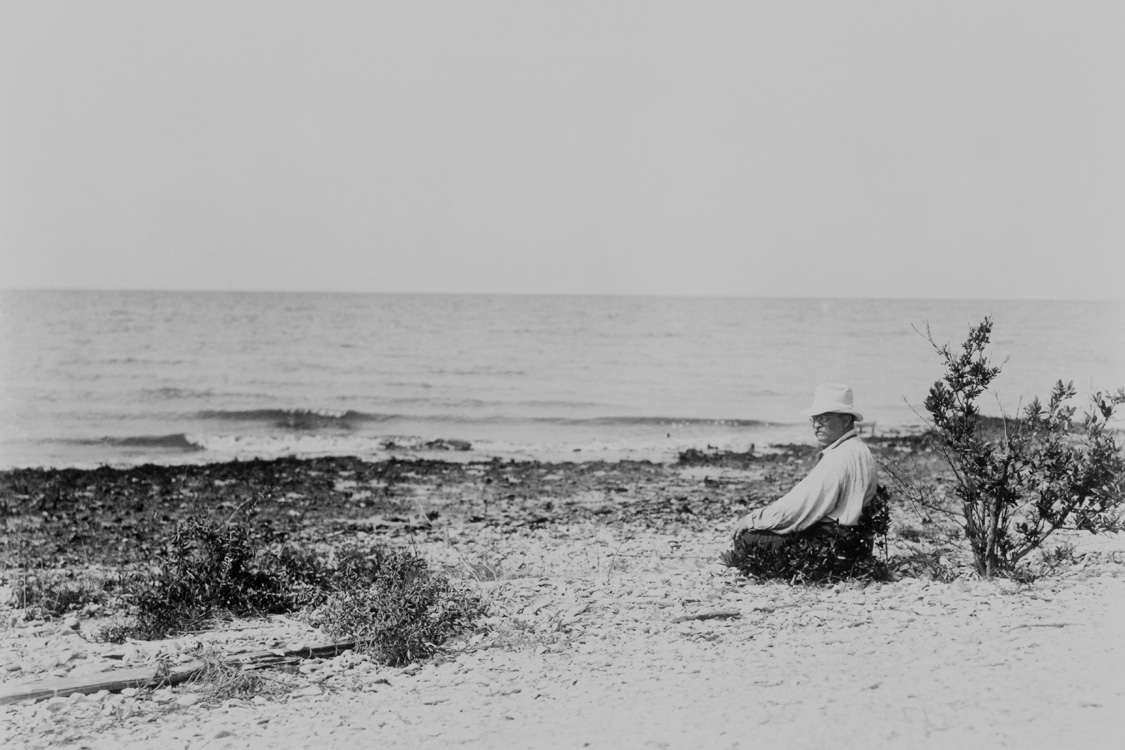
Theodore Roosevelt at Breton NWR in 1915

In 1904, Roosevelt heard about the destruction of birds and their eggs on Chandeleur and Breton Islands and soon afterward created Breton NWR. He visited in June 1915 after his presidency had ended; it is the only National Wildlife Refuge Roosevelt ever visited. The islands have been the site of a lighthouse station (destroyed by Hurricane Katrina), a quarantine station, a small fishing village and an oil production facility. Those man-made structures were destroyed by nature and only the birds remain. Fishermen, birdwatchers and artists such as Walter Inglis Anderson visit the island.

In 1915, several families and a school were located on Breton Island. Prior to the hurricane of that year, the island was evacuated. The hurricane destroyed the settlement, and it was never rebuilt.

All of the federally owned lands, except for North Breton Island, in Breton NWR became part of the National Wilderness Preservation System on January 3, 1975 (Public Law 93-632). North Breton was excluded because an oil facility, owned by Kerr-McGee, Inc., was located on that island. The Breton Wilderness, according to the Clean Air Act, is listed as a Class I Prevention of Significant Deterioration Area. The only visible improvement within the wilderness was the Chandeleur Lighthouse on the north end of the islands; the lighthouse was constructed before the turn of the 20th century.

=== Storm and hurricane damage ===
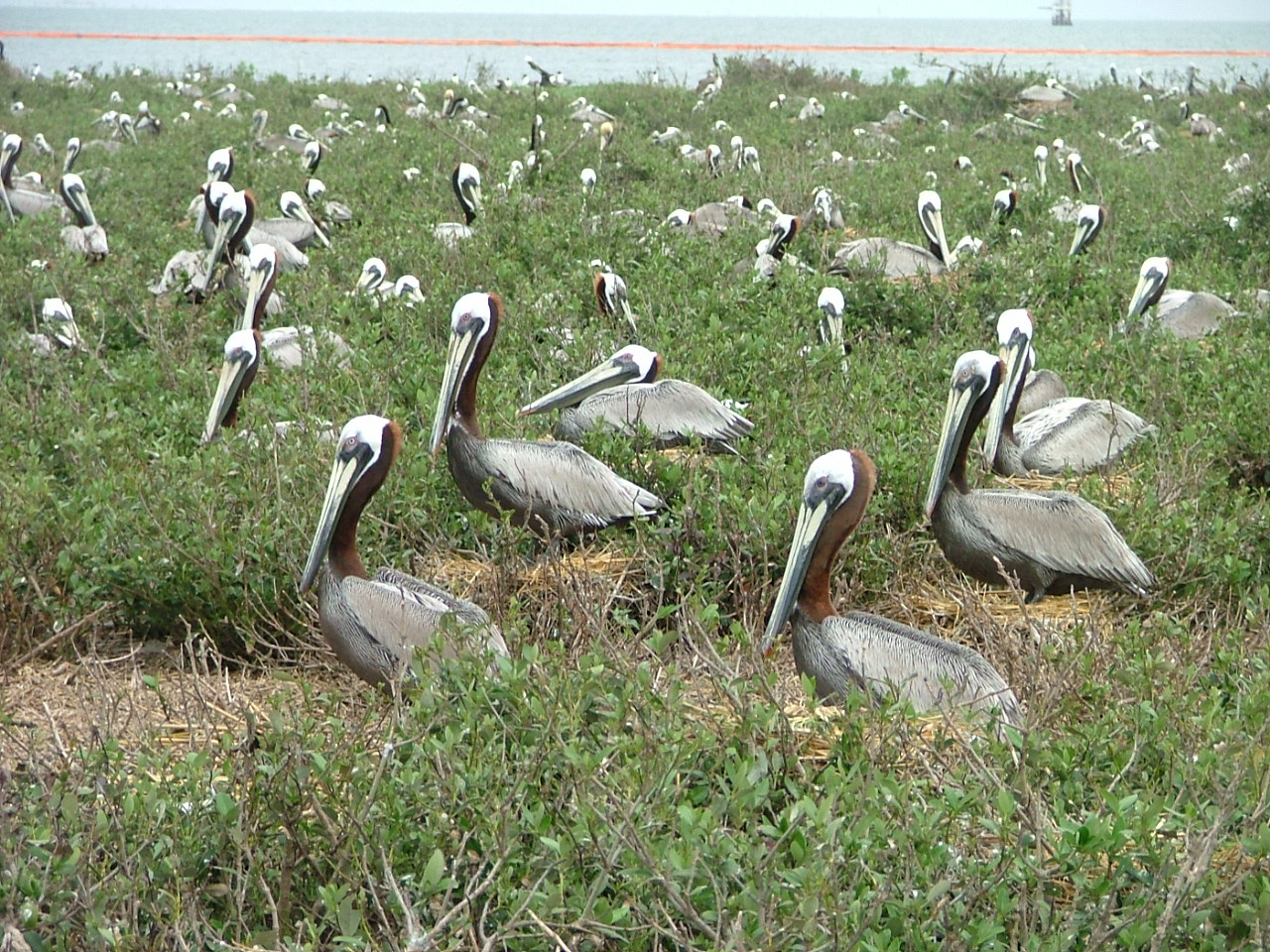
Brown pelicans on Breton island, 3 May 2010, as oil spill approaches. Oil containment boom in background.

The 2005 storm season was very bad for the pelicans of Breton NWR. In June, Tropical Storm Arlene moved through the Gulf of Mexico. The storm washed over the islands at a time when many juvenile pelicans were unable to escape and many eggs were still in the nests. On top of that, an oil spill washed directly into the nesting areas and many young pelicans were covered with oil. Some of the pelicans were rescued, rehabilitated and returned to the refuge but many more did not survive.

A direct hit from Hurricane Katrina caused significant erosion of the islands. Large areas of beach and marsh were destroyed and much of the vegetation that stabilizes the islands and provides habitat for the pelicans and other animals was uprooted or damaged. The Chandeleur Island Lighthouse was destroyed.

=== Oil spill ===
On April 30, 2010, an oil spill from the rig Deepwater Horizon approached the wildlife refuge. The refuge was closed on May 7, 2010 to limit disturbances of nesting seabirds and allow cleanup operations to proceed unimpeded.

== Restoration ==
The U.S. Fish and Wildlife Service is working with their partners to respond to the many problems created by the damage to the islands. It would take many years for the islands to recover naturally (if ever) so they will do what they can to rebuild and re-vegetate the islands. They are also monitoring the brown pelicans and other birds that return to nest on the islands and nearby, less desirable habitat to determine the long-term impact on this endangered species.

A wildlife recovery seems to be occurring, however. As many as 2,000 brown pelican nests have been reported on the refuge in 2007. The pelican nests, eggs and chicks remain vulnerable through the hurricane season and until they have fledged and can forage on their own.

Efforts are currently underway to rebuild Breton island, adding 53 acres of bird nesting habitat.

== Geography ==
Breton NWR includes Breton Island in Plaquemines Parish and all of the Chandeleur Islands in St. Bernard Parish, Louisiana. The barrier islands that make up Breton NWR are remnants of the Mississippi River's former St. Bernard Delta, which was active about 2,000 years ago. These barrier islands are dynamic; their sizes and shapes constantly are altered by tropical storms, wind, and tidal action. The area above mean high tide is approximately 6,923 acres (28.02 km^{2}). Elevations on Breton NWR range from sea level to 19 ft (5.8 m) above mean sea level. Early literature on Breton and the Chandeleur Islands mentions trees and a generally higher elevation than exists today.

=== List of islands ===
Chandeleur Island chain: The islands are considered part of the St. Bernard Barrier system or St. Bernard Delta Complex.

- Chandeleur Islands
  - Old Harbor Island (St. Bernard Parish): A shoal and part of the Chandeleur Island chain
  - Freemason Islands (Now considered a shoal).
  - Curlew Islands: (Now considered an ephemeral shoal). The northern half is in St. Bernard Parish and the southern half is in Plaquemines Parish. Curlew, North Gosier, and South Gosier Islands, have been the only location in the world where the Chandeleur Gull is found. It is a cross between the Kelp and Herring Gulls.
  - New Harbor Island (St. Bernard Parish) .
  - South Gosier Island (Gosier Island).
  - Grand Gosier Island, North Gosier in Plaquemines Parish, and is an ephemeral shoal).
  - Breton Islands (Plaquemines Parish)
  - North Breton Island (North Island), in St. Bernard Parish, is excluded from the National Wilderness Preservation System (see history above) but is part of the Breton National Wildlife Refuge.

== Fauna ==
Breton NWR provides habitat for colonies of nesting wading birds and seabirds, as well as wintering shorebirds and waterfowl. Twenty-three species of seabirds and shorebirds frequently use the refuge, and 13 species nest on the various islands. The most abundant nesters are brown pelicans, laughing gulls, and royal, Caspian, and Sandwich terns. Waterfowl winter near the refuge islands and use the adjacent shallows, marshes, and sounds for feeding and for protection during inclement weather. Redheads and lesser scaup account for the majority of waterfowl use. Other wildlife species found on the refuge include coypu, rabbits, raccoons, and loggerhead sea turtles.

== Flora ==
The dominant vegetation on Breton NWR are black mangrove (Avicennia germinans), groundsel bush (Baccharis halimifolia), and wax myrtle (Myrica cerifera). Shallow bay waters around the islands support beds of manatee grass (Cymodocea filiformis), shoal grass (Halodule wrightii), turtle grass (Thalassia testudinum), and widgeon grass (Ruppia maritima).

== See also ==
- List of National Wildlife Refuges: Louisiana
