= Breton Island (Louisiana) =

Islands in Plaquemines Parish, Louisiana, United States

Coordinates: 29°27′51″N 89°11′58″W

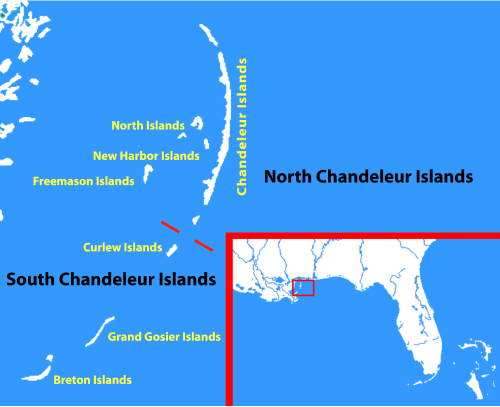
Map of the Breton and Chandeleur Sounds

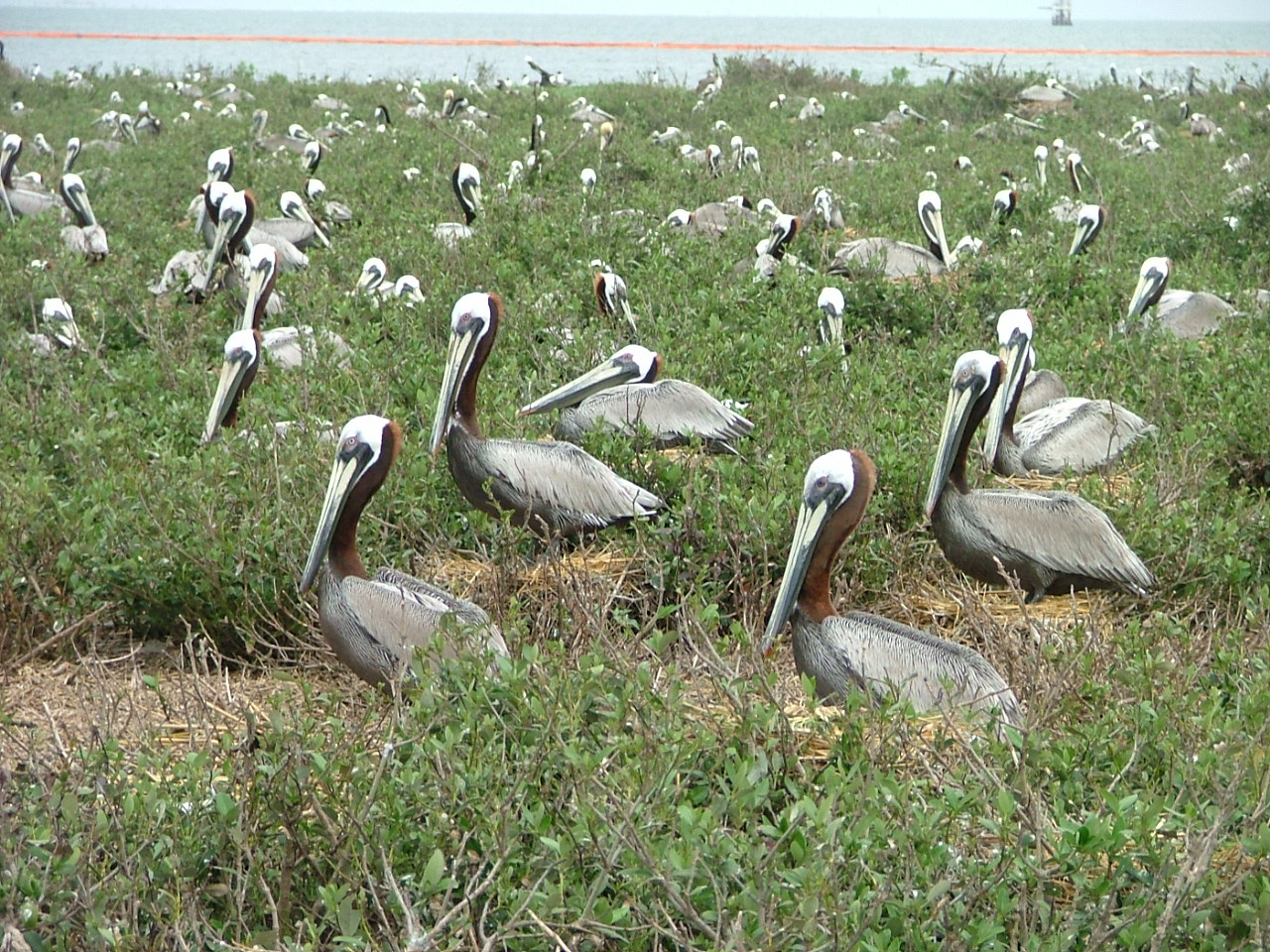
Brown pelicans nesting on Breton Island

Breton Island is an island (or group of barrier islands) in the Gulf of Mexico near the mouth of the Mississippi River and part of Plaquemines Parish, Louisiana. It is part of the Breton National Wildlife Refuge, which was established in 1904.

== Number of islands ==
In the early 19th century, Breton Island comprised two islands. Prior to Hurricane Opal in 1995, it was a single island, and was divided in two by that storm. After Hurricane Georges in 1998 it was divided into three islands. Hurricane Ivan in 2004 caused additional damage to the island.

== Erosion and restoration ==
Breton Island decreased from 820 acres (330 ha) in 1869 to 125 acres (51 ha) in 1996. Some restoration was done in 1999 funded pursuant to the Water Resources Development Act of 1992; the project was put on hold in 2000. Fines from the Deepwater Horizon oil spill are being used for rebuilding Breton Island. They aim to enlarge the island to 400 acres (160 ha).
