= Deering Island =

Island in British Columbia, Canada

Coordinates: 49°13′03″N 123°10′58″W

Deering Island is a small island in Vancouver, British Columbia, in the North Arm of the Fraser River. It is mostly residential and connected to the rest of Vancouver by the Deering Island Bridge. Residential development, consisting mostly of luxury homes, began there in 1988 and continued into the 1990s. The island was previously a shipyard owned by B.C. Packers. It has a city park, Deering Island Park.
