= Chandeleur Island Light =

Lighthouse in Louisiana, US

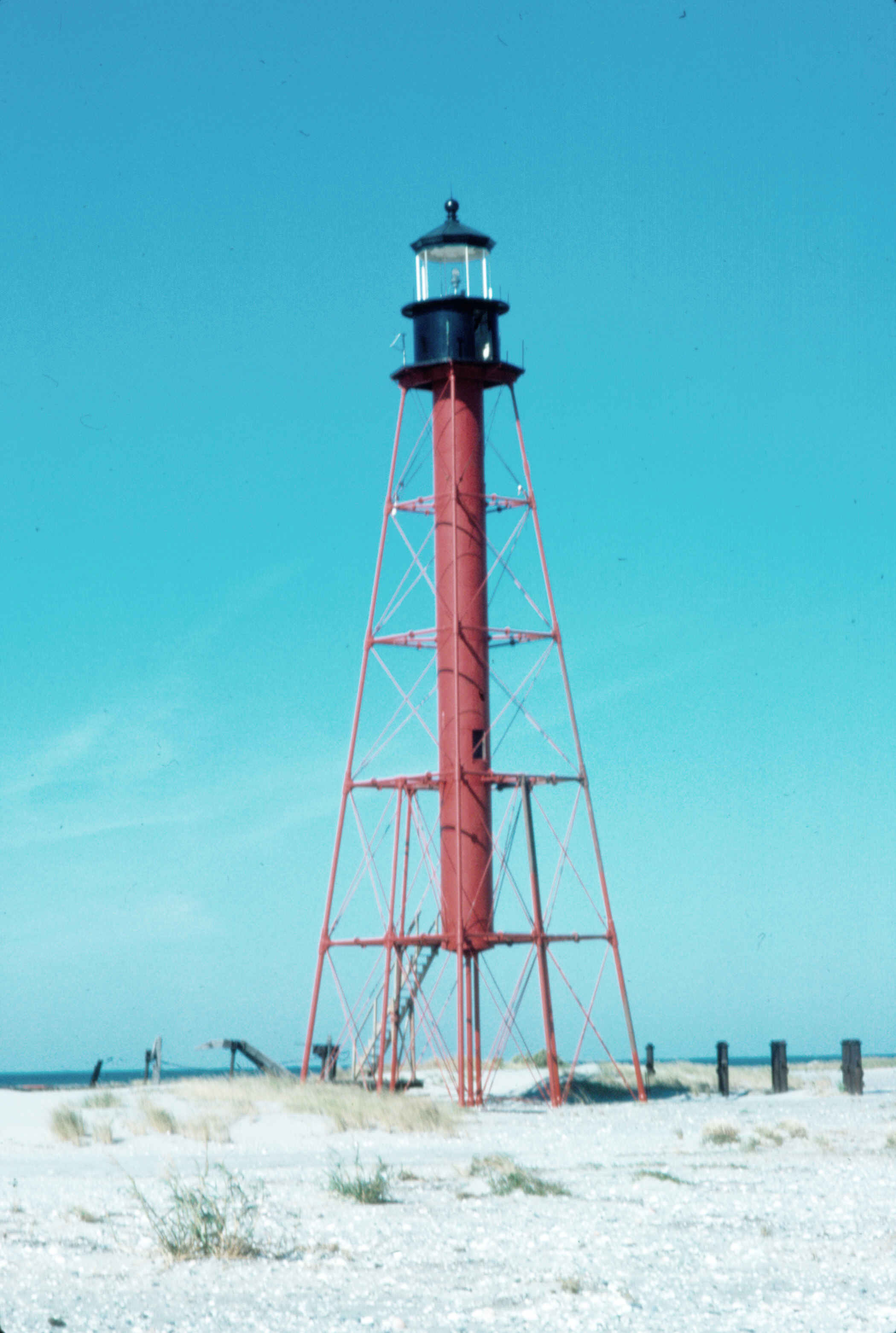
- c. 1986
- Location: Chandeleur Islands, Gulf of Mexico, Louisiana
- Coordinates: 30°2′50″N 88°52′41″W

Tower
- Constructed: 1848
- Foundation: Pile
- Construction: Iron
- Automated: 1966
- Shape: Skeletal with cylinder
- Markings: Brown with black lantern
- Heritage: National Register of Historic Places listed place
- Fog signal: none

Light
- First lit: 1896 (most recent tower)
- Deactivated: destroyed by Katrina, 2005
- Focal height: 102 feet (31 m)
- Lens: 3rd order Fresnel lens
- Characteristic: various, most recent: Flashing white
- Chandeleur Light
- U.S. National Register of Historic Places
- Nearest city: New Orleans, Louisiana
- Area: 0.1 acres (0.040 ha)
- Built: 1896
- Architectural style: Lighthouse Tower
- NRHP reference No.: 86001404
- Added to NRHP: June 25, 1986

The Chandeleur Island Light was a lighthouse established in 1848 near the northern end of the Chandeleur Islands in the Gulf of Mexico, off the east coast of Louisiana. Hurricane Katrina destroyed the light in 2005.

== History ==
The first light was finished in 1848 with nine lamps in 21 inches (530 mm) reflectors about 55 feet (17 m) above the base. The tower and the keeper's house were destroyed by a hurricane in August 1852.

A second, brick, tower was in operation by 1855, with a focal plane of 50 feet (15 m). By 1865 it had a 4th order Fresnel lens. This tower was the only building on the site that survived the hurricane of October 1, 1893, but it was badly damaged and was taken down. Congress appropriated $35,000 for its replacement.

A new, iron skeleton tower with a 3rd order Fresnel lens (focal plane 102 feet (31 m)) was erected in its place in 1895. The light figured in a case before the United States Supreme Court. After a barge carrying fertilizer ran aground, it was determined that the Coast Guard had been negligent in maintaining the proper operation of the light. The Court held that the United States was liable. The light was added to the National Register of Historic Places in 1986 as Chandeleur Light.

Erosion eventually left the tower standing alone in the water, with the last auxiliary building, a keeper's house, destroyed by Hurricane Camille in 1969. The tower was utterly destroyed by Hurricane Katrina in 2005, so that a visit by a research vessel the following spring found no trace of it.

== Gallery ==
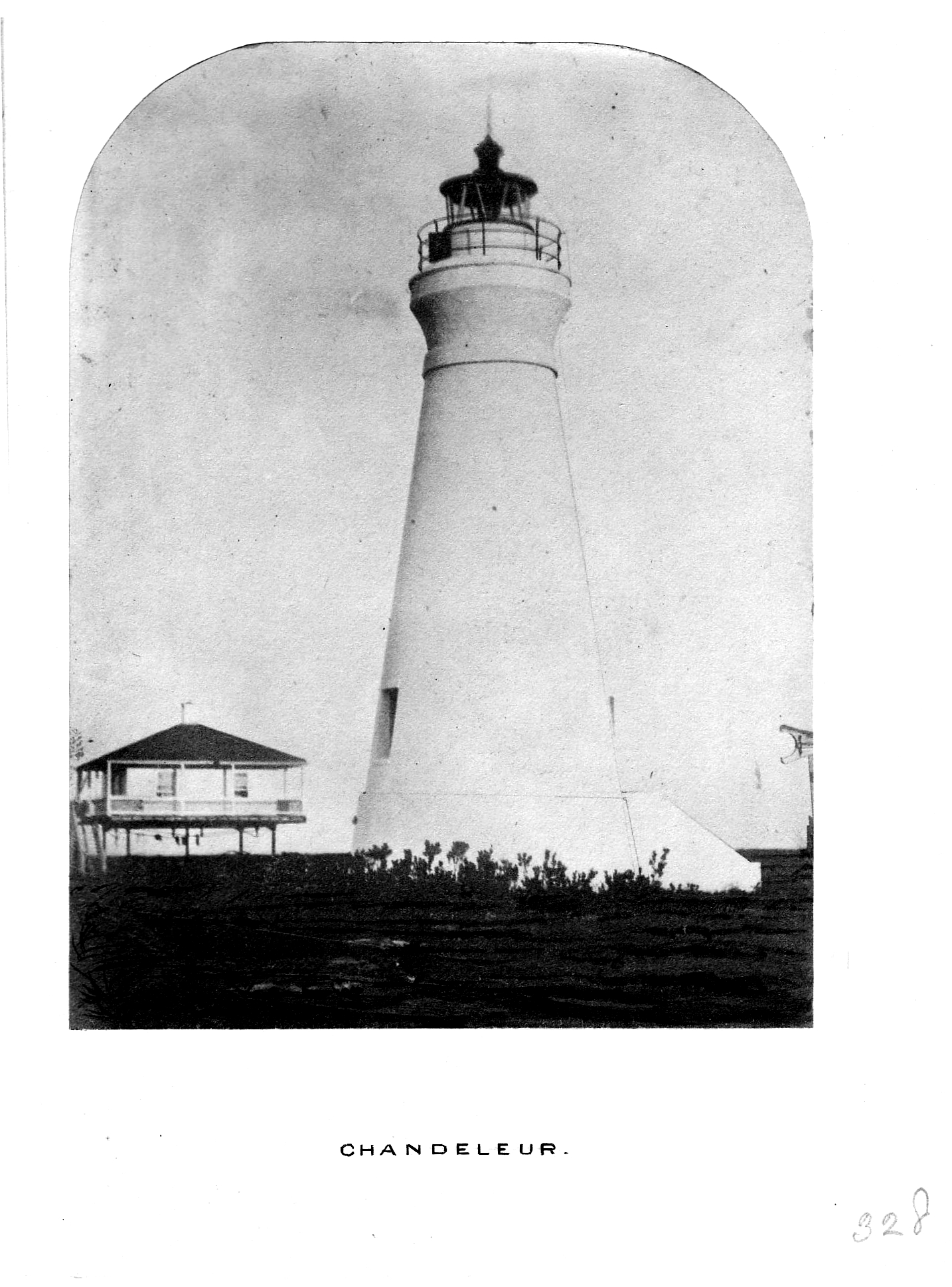
The 1856 brick tower

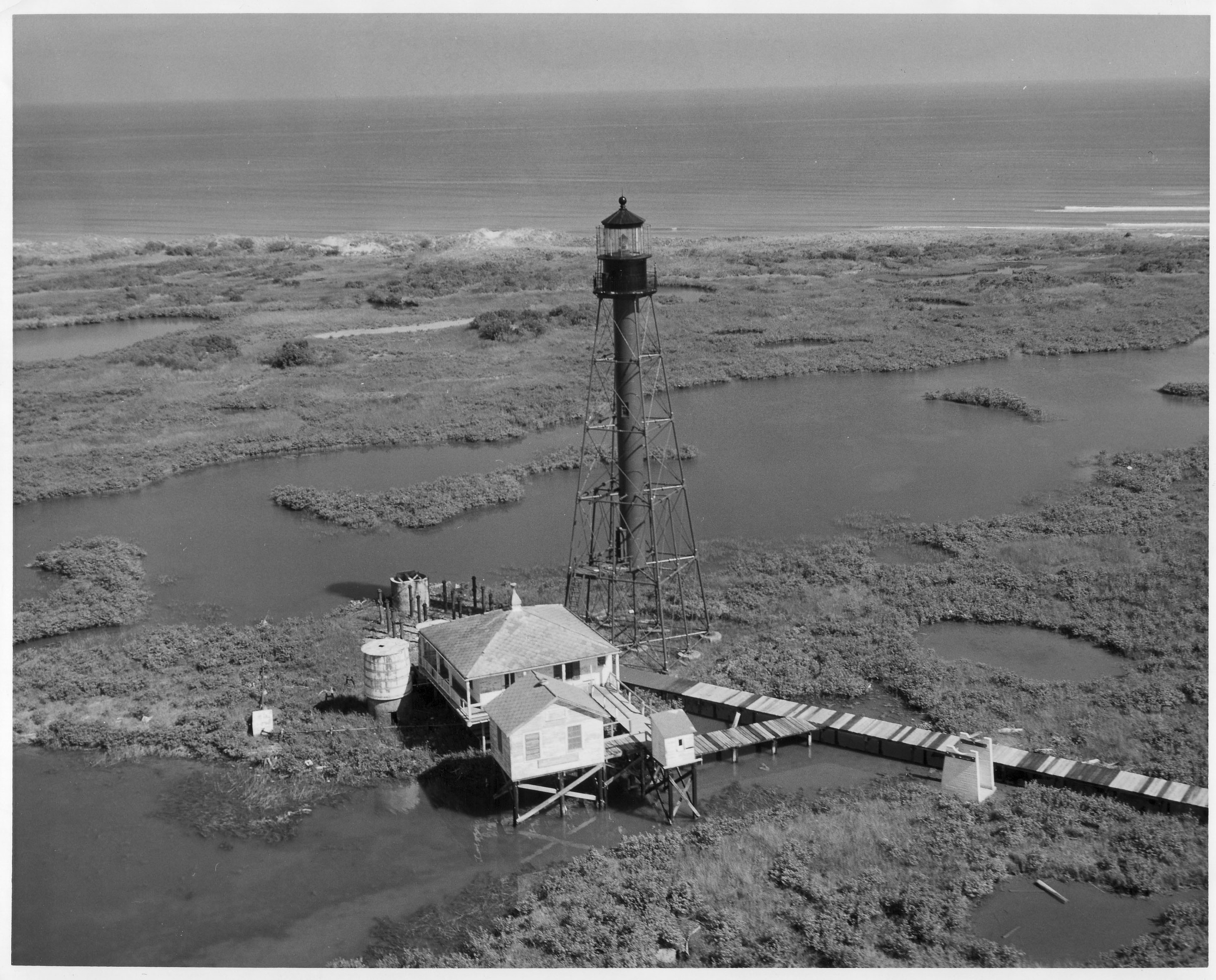
The light in 1960. Note how much more land there is than in 1971.

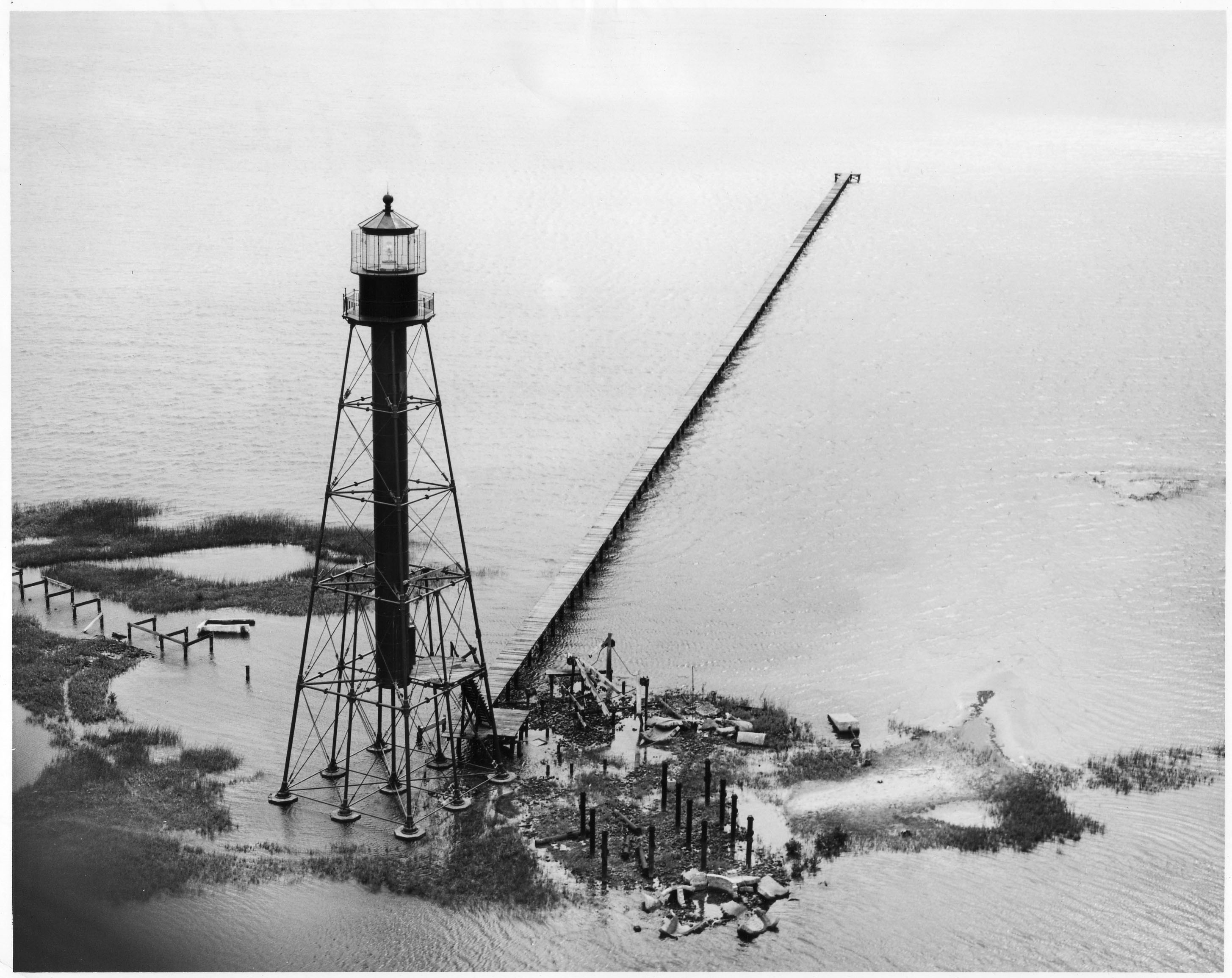
1971
