= Gaylords Island =

Island in Beaufort County, North Carolina, United States

Coordinates: 35°35′19″N 76°37′18″W

Gaylords Island is an island that covers part of Pantego, North Carolina and Belhaven, North Carolina. It has a population of about 5,000 people. It spans from Leechville to Pantego, and in rivers from the Pantego Creek to the Pungo River also contains a large number of points, mostly along the Pungo River.
