= Carpenters Island (Oregon) =

Island in the Rogue River in the U.S. state of Oregon

Coordinates: 42.558447°N 123.595625°W

Carpenters Island is an island in the Rogue River in the U.S. state of Oregon about one mile upstream from Galice. It is named for Francis A. "Frank" Carpenter, a native of Illinois who settled there in the early 1900s. The Bureau of Land Management maintains a small boat landing nearby called Carpenters Island Park. Some maps identify the island as Carpenter Island, but the U.S. Board on Geographic Names has officially approved "Carpenters Island."
