= Queen Bess, Scunthorpe =

Listed pub in Lincolnshire, England

Queen Bess
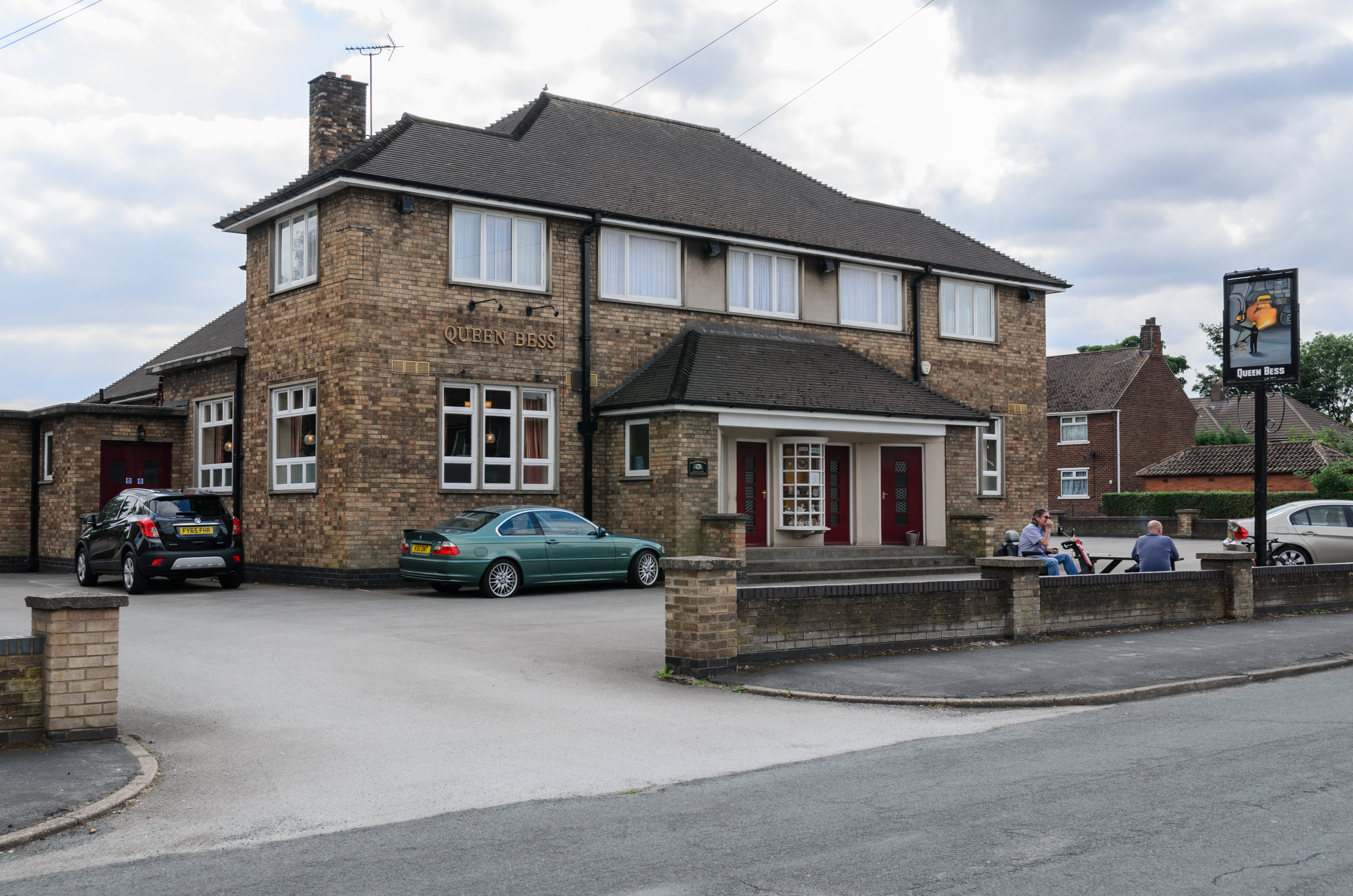
- The pub in 2018
- Former names: Queen Bess Hotel

General information
- Type: Public house
- Location: Derwent Road, Scunthorpe, Lincolnshire, England
- Coordinates: 53°33′56″N 0°37′51″W
- Year built: 1959; 67 years ago
- Renovated: 2016 (refurbished)
- Owner: Samuel Smith's

Design and construction
- Architects: Wilburn and Son
- Designations

Listed Building – Grade II
- Official name: The Queen Bess public house
- Designated: 30 April 2018
- Reference no.: 1454513

The pub sign in 2014, depicting the Queen Bess blast furnace

The Queen Bess is a Grade II listed public house on Derwent Road in Scunthorpe, Lincolnshire, England. Built for Samuel Smith's to designs by the Doncaster architects Wilburn and Son, it opened in 1959 and was named after a blast furnace at the nearby Appleby-Frodingham steelworks. The pub is noted for its unusually well-preserved post-war interior, retaining much of its original layout and fittings, and is included on the Campaign for Real Ale (CAMRA)'s National Inventory of Historic Pub Interiors with a three-star rating for interiors of "outstanding national historic importance".

== History ==
Designed by Doncaster architects Wilburn and Son, the public house was built by Samuel Smith's, which remain its owner, and opened on 18 December 1959. It was named after a similarly titled blast furnace at the nearby Appleby-Frodingham steelworks, which had opened in 1950 and then formed part of the largest steelworks in Britain. The building incorporated several modern features for the period, including underfloor heating and a central sound system with loudspeakers installed throughout the premises. The sign outside the pub depicts Queen Elizabeth I on one side and a blast furnace on the other. It quickly became a focal point of the local area.

Although alterations have been limited, including the insertion of a doorway behind the lounge bar servery in 2012 and refurbishment work undertaken by Samuel Smith's in 2016, much of the original interior survives. The Campaign for Real Ale (CAMRA) regards it as having an interior of "outstanding national historic importance" and awards it a three-star rating on its National Inventory of Historic Pub Interiors.

On 30 April 2018, the Queen Bess was designated a Grade II listed building. Historic England considers it to be one of the best examples of post-World War II 20th-century pub architecture, and notes that many pubs of a similar age have been closed or demolished. It was one of five post-war pubs, and the second in Scunthorpe, to be awarded this status.

== Architecture ==
=== Exterior ===
It features a brick exterior and a plain tile roof, which was designed to be compatible with new local housing developments. The pub has an irregular T-shaped layout. Its principal range faces north, while a secondary range extends south from the rear and is positioned near the centre of the building.

The main part of the building has two storeys and a balanced frontage divided into five bays. The central section is covered by a hipped roof, with lower hipped roofs over the end sections. Two substantial brick chimneys rise from the rear of the roof.

At the centre of the front elevation is a single-storey entrance porch with its own hipped roof. This provides access to the ground-floor bar rooms, the former off-sales area, and the staircase leading to the upper floor. A small semi-circular window lights the former off-sales section, while doorways on either side lead to the various public rooms and the stairwell.

Large windows flank the entrance porch, and the upper floor contains a row of evenly spaced windows. Similar windows are found on the side elevations, lighting the bar areas.

Behind the front range is a tall single-storey hall that was built as a concert room and connected directly to the main building. It is entered through a lobby projecting from the rear of the front range. The hall has a hipped roof, windows on three sides, and an additional entrance at its south-west corner. Single-storey toilet blocks project from both sides of the complex.

=== Interior ===
The pub retains much of its original internal layout and character, including three distinct bar areas. The public bar, known as The Tap, preserves its original timber bar counter, canopy, mirrored back fitting, fixed seating and fireplace. The lounge bar also survives with much of its historic detailing, including a distinctive timber-fronted counter, an angled canopy, and built-in seating along two walls.

A third bar area is located at the northern end of the former concert room and is served from the same central service area as the other bars. It retains a long bar counter, an altered but largely original back fitting, and a timber fascia bearing the name Queens Bar. Although the concert room's stage has been removed, fixed seating remains along both sides of the room.

Most of the interior fittings date from the original opening, including bar counters, fixed seating, furniture and doors. The former off-sales section, which is no longer used for its original purpose, still contains its service counter, canopy and shelving. A commemorative cast-iron plaque survives in the Queens Bar, marking the opening of the Queen Bess Hotel.
