= Bartoo Island =

Island in Idaho

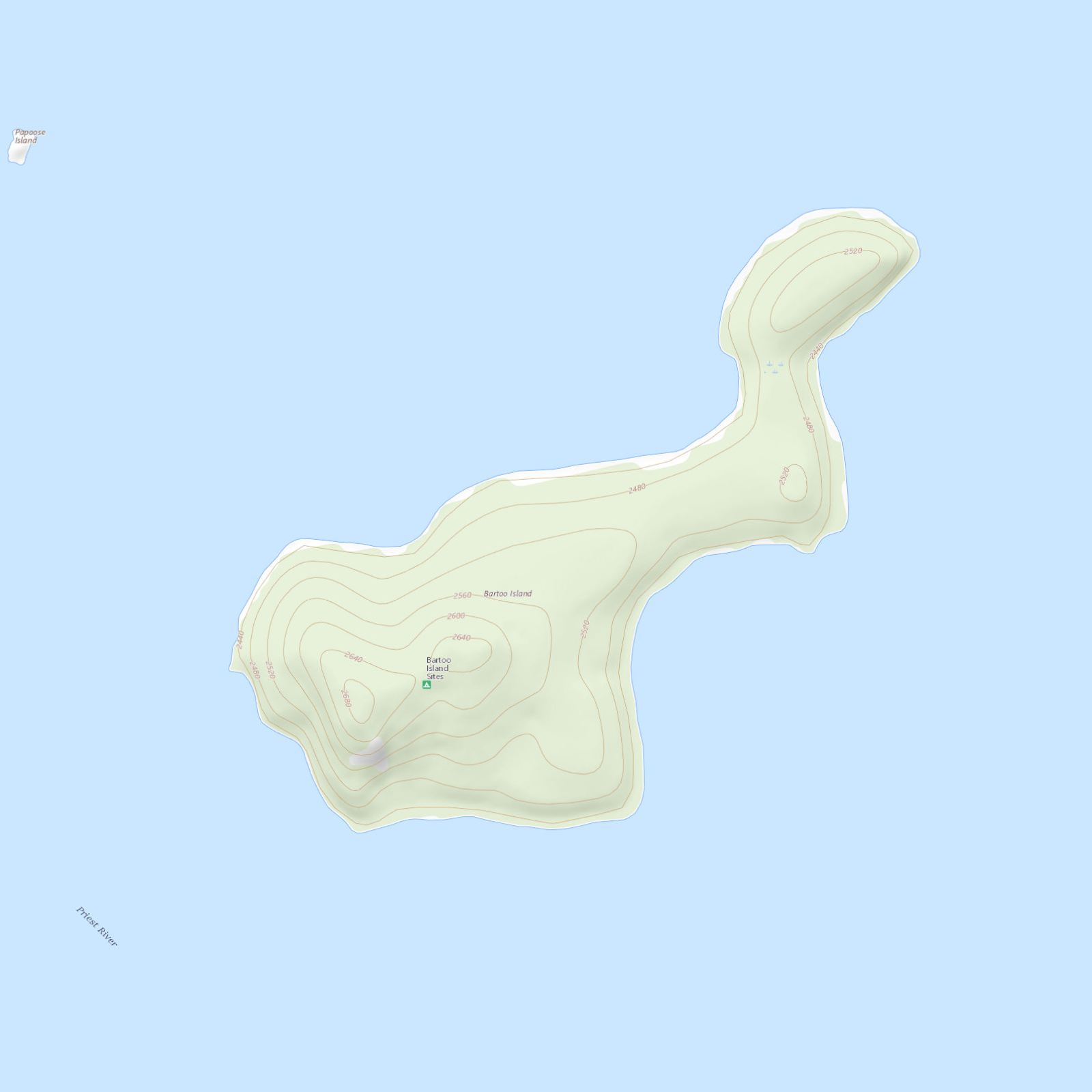
- USGS topographic map of Bartoo Island

- Location within Idaho Location within the United States

Geography
- Location: Idaho
- Coordinates: 48°32′45″N 116°52′38″W
- Highest elevation: 2,559 ft (780 m)

Administration
- United States
- State: Idaho
- County: Bonner

Bartoo Island (also Baritoe Island) is an island in Priest Lake (in Bonner County, Idaho), owned by George Bartoo in the late 1800s. Its coordinates are 48°32′45″N 116°52′38″W,; the United States Geological Survey gives its elevation as 2,559 ft (780 m). Campsites are available on the island.
