= Belle Isle, Louisiana =

Island in St. Mary Parish, Louisiana, United States

Belle Isle
- Location within Louisiana

Geography
- Location: St. Mary Parish, Louisiana, United States
- Coordinates: 29°31′40.8″N 91°23′57.4″W
- Adjacent to: Gulf Intracoastal Waterway
- Area: 800 acres (320 ha)

Administration
- United States
- State: Louisiana
- Parish: St. Mary

Demographics
- Population: 1

Belle Isle is a 4,500 acres (1,800 ha) private island and structural salt dome in St. Mary, Parish, Louisiana. In places the island rises 16 feet (4.9 m) to 80 feet (24 m) above sea level and is one of the "Five islands" salt domes. The other four are Cote Blanche Island (White Castle), Avery Island, Jefferson Island, and Weeks Island. The island is approximately 16 miles (26 km) southwest of Morgan City. The salt dome contains 98% to 99.6% pure sodium chloride, considered almost pure halite (NaCl).

== History ==
Early inhabitants were the Chitimacha and later the Atakapa-Ishak Indians. From 1896, to the discovery of oil, by Sun Oil Company No. 1 for the Belle Isle Corporation, on March 31, 1941, 45 wells were drilled for salt. By 1955, 27 wells had been drilled but more than half were dry. By this time 2 and 1/2 million barrels of oil had been produced. 1970, sixty-eight completed wells averaged 280 MMCF gas (C & S), and 6500 barrels of oil and condensate from 55 wells.

=== Salt mine ===
Cargill Incorporated opened a salt mine in 1962. The salt was extracted from 1,200 feet (370 m), 1,400 feet (430 m), and eventually 1,600 feet (490 m) under ground. It produced 400,000 long tons (410,000 t) of salt in the first year and was averaging 1,600,000 long tons (1,600,000 t) per year by 1968. The mine was plagued troubles and had numerous inspections and violation. A fire broke out on March 5, 1968, with twenty-one workers under ground. Twenty workers died due to carbon monoxide poisoning, and one due to blunt head force trauma. In 1979 a gas explosion killed five miners. In 1984 the mine was determined to be in danger of collapsing and abandoned. In 1985 a leak was detected and by the end of the year the mine was intentionally flooded.

=== Oil and gas ===
There were a total of 277 wells drilled in the Belle Isle oil & gas field by Sun Exploration-Production company, Texas Petroleum Investment Company, and Texaco.

== Geography ==
Belle Isle is the southern most of the "Five Islands" that also includes Cote Blanche Island (White Castle), Avery Island, Jefferson Island, and Weeks Island.

Belle Isle borders New Pass, Atchafalaya River along the western side, Goat Island to the northwest and Grass Island to the north, separated by the east to west Big Wax Bayou. Bell Isle Point butts against the Atchafalaya River, south of the Big Wax Bayou. Poverty Bayou runs south from Big Wax Bayou past the western side of the salt dome. A canal and dock runs north from the canal to gulf. The Atchafalaya delta has grown considerable since 1984. The southern portion of Belle Isle, mostly marsh land that bordered the Gulf of Mexico, is now mostly concealed by the east side of the growing delta.

== Other disasters and accidents ==
- Two were killed in a 2012 Belle Isle helicopter crash.
- Four people were injured after gas well blowout in Louisiana bayou while attempting to plug a well.
