= Avoca Island =

Island in St. Mary Parish, Louisiana, United States

- Location within Louisiana

Geography
- Location: St. Mary Parish, Louisiana, United States
- Coordinates: 29°39′23″N 91°08′45″W
- Adjacent to: Gulf Intracoastal Waterway
- Area: 16,000 acres (6,500 ha)

Administration
- United States
- State: Louisiana
- Parish: St. Mary

Demographics
- Population: 1 (2008)

Avoca Island is an island in St. Mary Parish, Louisiana, United States, near Morgan City. The island is located in the coastal marsh and bayou region south of Morgan City, along the Gulf Intracoastal Waterway.

The island has been used for cattle grazing, duck hunting, oil and gas activity, and other industrial and recreational purposes. A 2008 report in The Times of Houma/Thibodaux described Avoca as a 16,000-acre (6,500 ha) private island off Morgan City's coast.

== Geography ==
Avoca Island is classified by the Geographic Names Information System as an island in St. Mary Parish. Its primary coordinates are near the ZIP Code area for Morgan City. The island lies in the lower Atchafalaya Basin area, where bayous, canals, marshes and industrial waterways connect Morgan City with the Gulf of Mexico.

Access to the island has historically depended on a cable ferry. In 2008, St. Mary Parish officials considered whether to continue operating the ferry because of its cost. The ferry carried vehicles between Morgan City and Avoca Island, operated seven days a week and was pulled along underwater cables.

== History ==
Avoca Island has been associated with cattle grazing since the 19th century. Vanishing Paradise: Duck Hunting in the Louisiana Marsh states that Jim Bowie, known for the Bowie knife and his death at the Battle of the Alamo, grazed cattle on Avoca Island in the early 19th century.

In 1916, the Land Trust Company, headed by a New Orleans bond and investment broker, was formed to carry out a reclamation and colonization project about 8 miles (13 km) south of Morgan City in an area that included what is now Avoca Island. The project was abandoned because the marsh and swampland were too difficult for settlement.

By the early 20th century, the Morgan City region was tied to timber, fishing, trapping, transportation and later oil and gas activity. Avoca Island became part of that changing economic landscape as industrial development and petroleum activity expanded around Morgan City and the surrounding wetlands.

== Land use ==
Avoca Island has been used for cattle operations, oil and gas operations, hunting camps and industrial activity. In 2008, Avoca Land Manager Jim Bodin told the St. Mary Parish Council that although he was the island's only resident, three cattle operations and oil and gas operations used the ferry. He also said about 60 people used hunting camps on the island.

The same report said private hunting clubs and oil and gas interests used the island. It also reported that Avoca Land Inc., a New Orleans-based company, owned the island and that U.S. Securities and Exchange Commission documents described the company as a passive royalty company deriving most of its income from oil and gas leases, seismic permits and investments. The article said SEC records indicated that Avoca Land Inc. had owned the island since 1931.

== Avoca Duck Club ==
Avoca Island is home to the Avoca Duck Club, a private hunting club founded in 1937. The club is among the Louisiana duck hunting clubs described in Vanishing Paradise, a book on duck hunting, coastal wetlands and hunting culture in the Louisiana marsh.

== Ferry service ==
The Avoca Island ferry has been a point of public debate because of its operating cost and the private ownership of the island. In 2008, The Times of Houma/Thibodaux reported that St. Mary Parish had spent $215,000 to operate the ferry in 2007 and $228,000 during 2008, with $270,000 budgeted for the following year. Parish officials discussed whether to suspend the service, study alternatives or pursue a bridge.

The ferry served the island's caretaker, cattle operations, oil and gas interests, hunting camp users and other commercial users. Representatives of companies and property interests on the island argued that ferry access was needed for cattle care, oil and gas work, utility access and barge-related business.
