= Queen Bess Island Wildlife Refuge =

Wildlife refuge

- IUCN category V (protected landscape/seascape)
- Location within Louisiana
- Location: Jefferson Parish, Louisiana, United States
- Coordinates: 29°21′40″N 89°55′42″W
- Area: 37 acres (15 ha)
- Established: 2019
- Governing body: Louisiana Department of Wildlife and Fisheries

Queen Bess Island Wildlife Refuge is located on Queen Bess Island in the southern portion of Barataria Bay, Jefferson Parish, Louisiana, USA. The entire island was designatedas a refuge in 2019 and a restoration project completed in February 2020.

== Location ==
The wildlife refuge is located on Queen Bess Island, 3 miles (4.8 km) northeast of Grand Isle State Park, on Grand Isle.

== Fauna ==
The refuge is a nesting area for brown pelicans, American white pelicans, great egrets, laughing gulls, Sandwich terns, least terns, American oystercatchers, reddish egrets, roseate spoonbills, snowy egrets, tricolored herons and diamondback terrapins (Malaclemys terrapin).

== History ==
Brown pelicans stopped nesting on Queen Bess Island and extirpated from all of Louisiana by 1961 because of DDT. In 1968, a reintroduction program was started and young birds were brought from Florida and released. Queen Bess Island was one of three rookery sites chosen. The island had been severely damaged by repeated storms and only five of the 36 acres were able to support nesting.

In 2019, the Louisiana Wildlife and Fisheries Commission approved a resolution designating the island a state refuge. Through the Deepwater Horizon restoration project, funded by settlement funds, island restoration was completed in February 2020 in time for the nesting season. The refuge is the fourth largest brown pelican colony in the state. The island was only slightly damaged by Tropical Storm Cristobal.
