= Chandeleur Islands =

Island chain in the Gulf of Mexico

Coordinates: 29°50′09″N 88°50′04″W

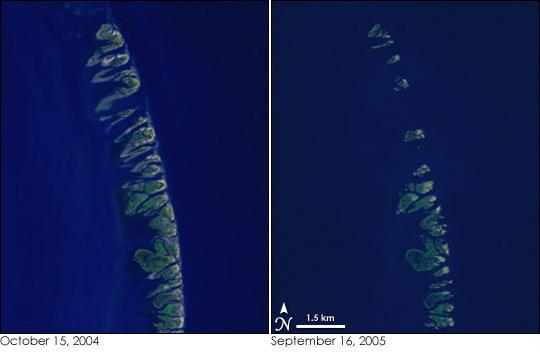
The left image is from 2004 and the right is after Hurricane Katrina, showing the reduction of the islands.

The Chandeleur Islands (French: Îles Chandeleur) are a chain of uninhabited barrier islands approximately 50 miles (80 km) long, located in the Gulf of Mexico, marking the outer boundary of the Chandeleur Sound. They form the easternmost point of the state of Louisiana, United States and are a part of the Breton National Wildlife Refuge. They are an important migrating point for many birds on their way south, and are a prime marsh and forest wildlife area.

== History ==
The islands were formed over 2,000 years ago as the rim of the St. Bernard Lobe of the Mississippi River delta.

The islands were named when the explorer Pierre Le Moyne d'Iberville was sailing in search of the mouth of the Mississippi River along the Gulf Coast. He christened the islands on the eve of Fête de la Chandeleur—also known as Candlemas, a Christian feast day—on February 1, 1700.

The Breton National Wildlife Refuge was established in 1904 and includes all of the Chandeleur Islands in the Gulf of Mexico. The refuge is the second-oldest in the National Wildlife Refuge System.

Prior to destruction by a hurricane in 1915 there was a fishing settlement on the islands, and even earlier there had been farming on the islands. The Chandeleur Island Light, built in 1895, stood as a landmark and recognizable location for mariners at sea and pilots flying over the Gulf of Mexico. The islands were constantly eroded and changed by wave action, and most dramatically after the storm surges following hurricanes.

The islands have been shrinking and migrating landward since the late 19th century. A survey in the 1980s estimated that they would be in existence for about three more centuries. Before 1996, the seaward front of the islands lost about 20–30 feet of land each year, mostly replaced at the rear. From 1996 to 2004, the loss rate grew to about 300 feet (91 m) per year. In 1998, Hurricane Georges destroyed the islands and left the lighthouse in the middle of the ocean, and the barrier islands had only just recovered when Hurricane Katrina struck on August 29, 2005.

Chandeleur Islands Timelapse from 1984-2016

However, the combined effect of Hurricane Dennis and Hurricane Katrina in 2005 reduced the island to shoals or sub-surface formations, and toppled the Chandeleur Island Light. Powerful storms can produce changes that would otherwise have taken many years. A study released in 2006 by geologists from the University of New Orleans shows that the usual sand and sediment patterns that rebuilt the islands after big storms have not been restored since Katrina reworked the area. There is also evidence of unprecedented landslides on the seafloor on the side toward the Gulf of Mexico, potentially allowing stronger waves with greater erosional impact to reach the islands.

In 2014, numerical models developed by other marine geologists indicated the islands could be mostly submerged within decades due to sea level rise, isolation from Mississippi River delta sediment, mud foundations, sediment transport issues, and damaging storms. However, a decade after this paper was published, the islands remain largely unchanged.

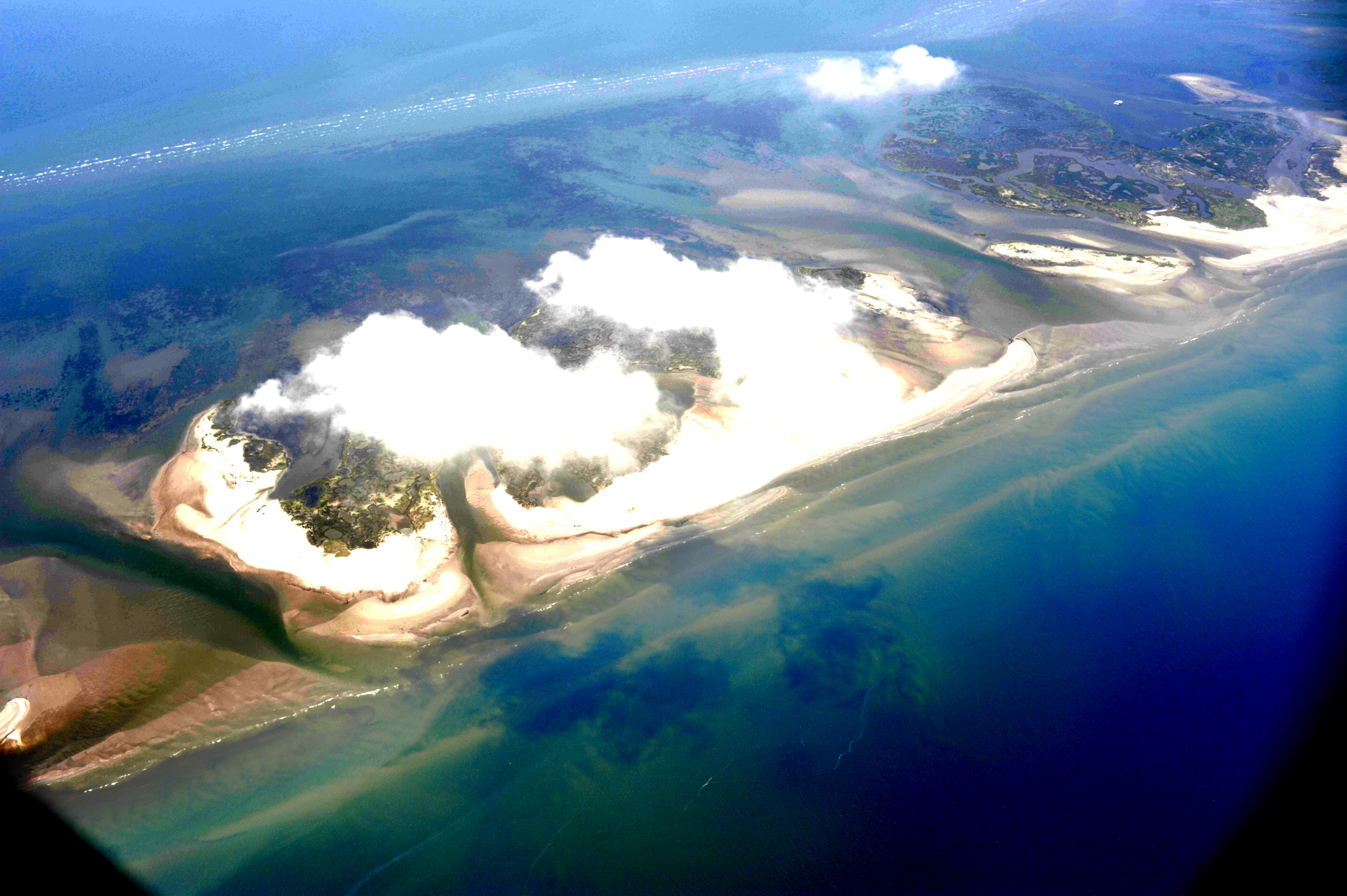
Deepwater Horizon oil spill slicks surround the Chandeleur Islands in this aerial photo.
