= New Iberia, Louisiana =

New Iberia La Nouvelle-Ibérie (French) Nueva Iberia (Spanish) Nouvèl Ibéri (Louisiana Creole)
- City
- City of New Iberia
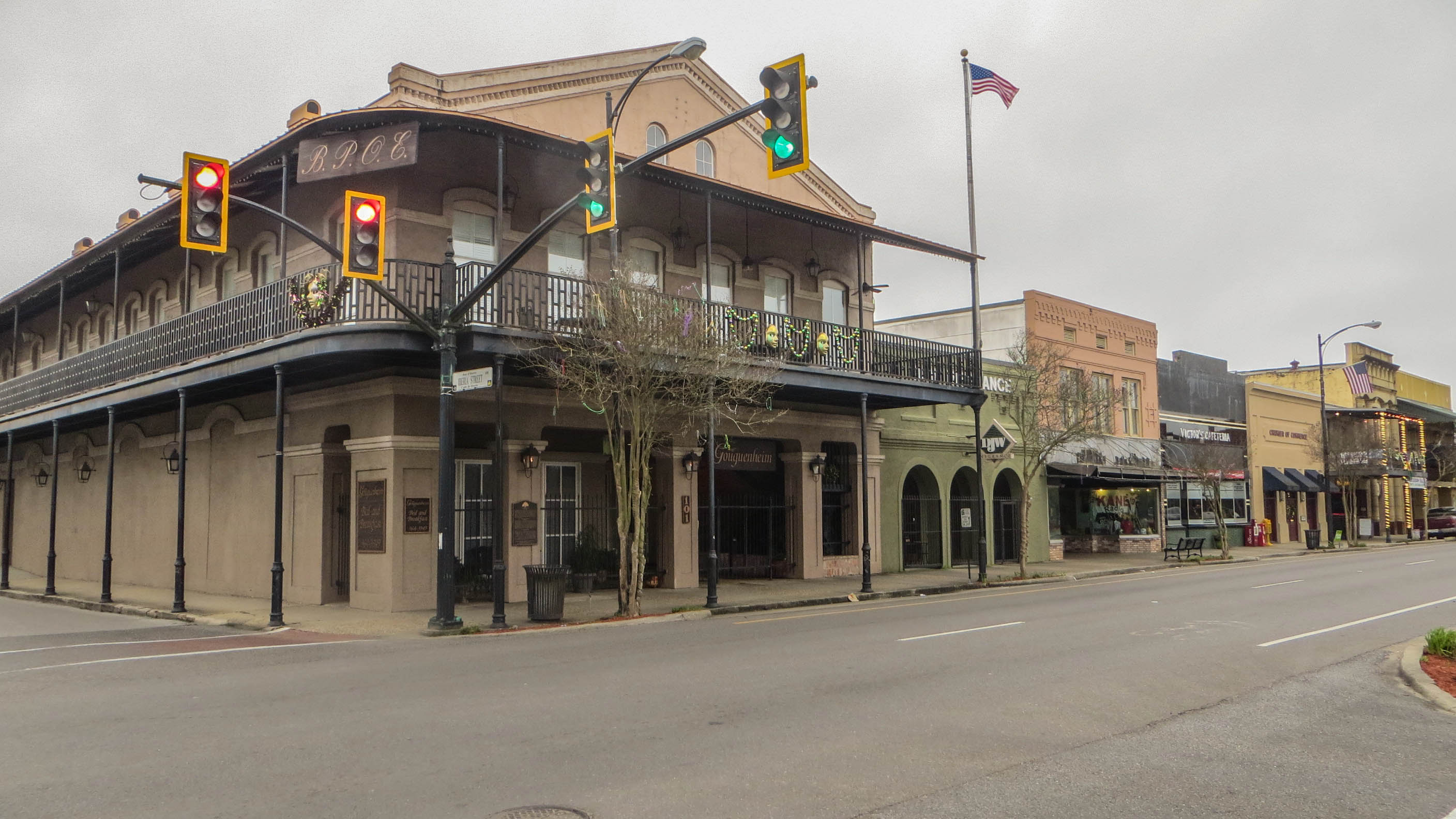
- Downtown New Iberia

- Location within Louisiana Location within the United States
- Coordinates: 30°0′21″N 91°49′6″W
- Country: United States
- State: Louisiana
- Parish: Iberia
- Founded: 1779
- Laid out: 1835
- Incorporated: 1839
- Founder: Don Francisco Bouligny
- Named for: Iberia

Area
  - Total: 11.25 sq mi (29.15 km^{2})
  - Land: 11.14 sq mi (28.85 km^{2})
  - Water: 0.11 sq mi (0.29 km^{2})
- Elevation: 16 ft (4.9 m)

Population (2020)
  - Total: 28,555
  - Density: 2,563.2/sq mi (989.64/km^{2})
- Time zone: UTC-6 (CST)
  - Summer (DST): UTC-5 (CDT)
- ZIP codes: 70560, 70562-70563
- FIPS code: 22-54035
- GNIS feature ID: 2404363
- Website: www.cityofnewiberia.com

New Iberia (French: La Nouvelle-Ibérie; (Note: French pronunciation: [la nuvɛlibeʁi]) Spanish: Nueva Iberia; (Note: Spanish pronunciation: [ˈnweβa iˈβeɾja]) Louisiana Creole: Nouvèl Ibéri) is the largest city in and the parish seat of Iberia Parish in the U.S. state of Louisiana. The city of New Iberia is located about 21 mi (34 km) southeast of Lafayette and forms part of the Lafayette metropolitan statistical area in the region of Acadiana. The 2020 United States census reported a population of 28,555. New Iberia is served by Amtrak's Sunset Limited, operating between Los Angeles and New Orleans. The city has a major four-lane highway, U.S. 90 (future Interstate 49), and has its own general-aviation airfield, Acadiana Regional Airport. Scheduled passenger and cargo airline service is available via the nearby Lafayette Regional Airport located adjacent to U.S. 90 in Lafayette.

== History ==
New Iberia dates its founding to the spring of 1779, when a group of some 500 colonists (Malagueños) from Spain, led by Lieutenant Colonel Don Francisco Bouligny, came up Bayou Teche and settled around what became known as Spanish Lake.

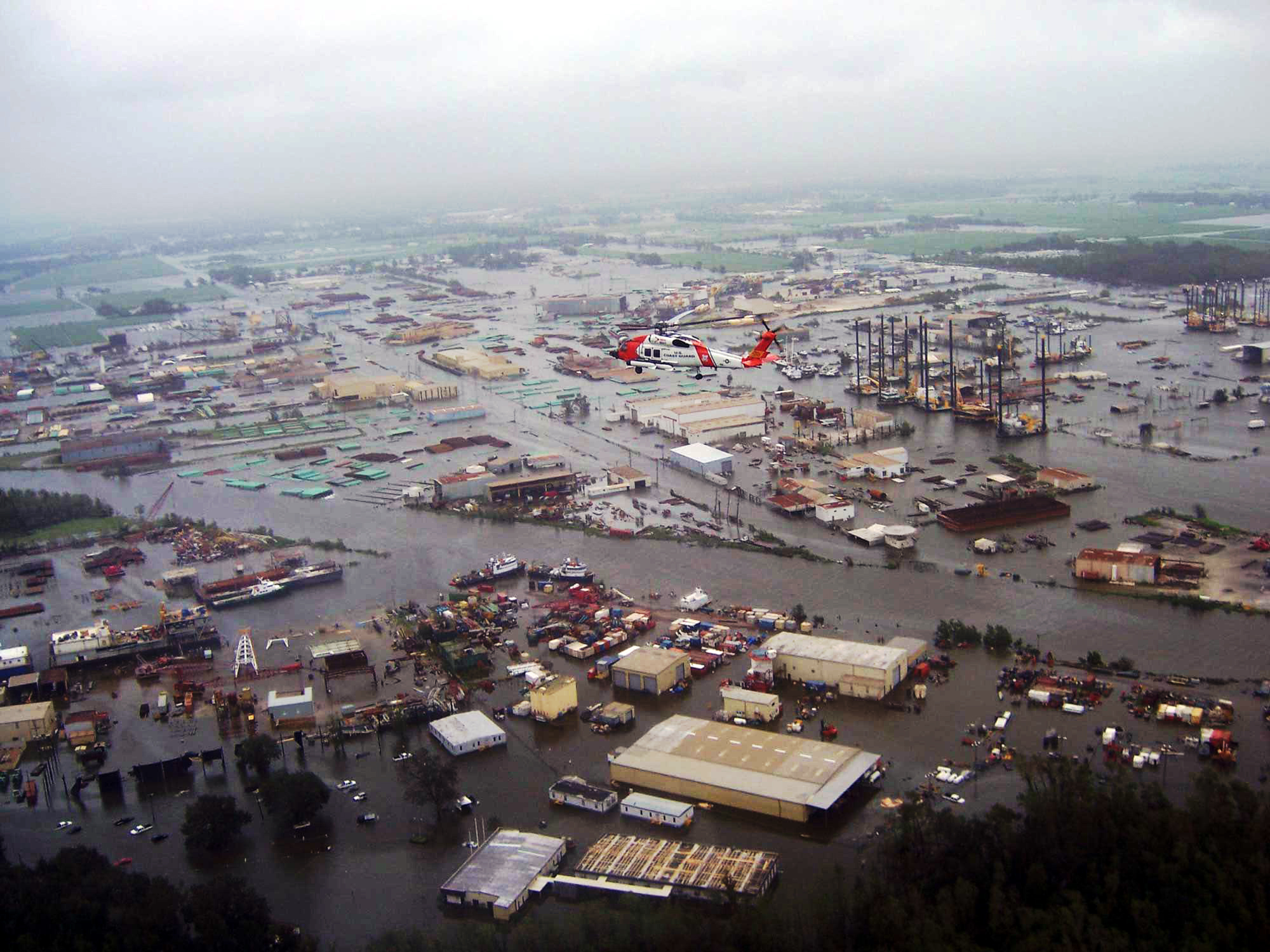
Flooding in New Iberia due to Hurricane Ike, September 2008

The Spanish settlers called the town Nueva Iberia in honor of the Iberian Peninsula; French-speakers referred to the town as Nouvelle Ibérie, while the English settlers arriving after the Louisiana Purchase called it "New Town". In 1814, the U.S. government opened a post office in the town, officially recognizing the name as New Iberia, but postmarks from 1802 show the town being called "Nova Iberia" (Latin for "new"). The town was incorporated in 1839 as the "Town of Iberia", but the state legislature amended the town's charter in 1847, recognizing New Iberia as the town's name.

In 1868, Iberia Parish was established, and New Iberia became the seat of parish government. At first, only rented space served for the courthouse. By 1884, a new courthouse was completed on a landscaped lot in downtown New Iberia, at the present-day site of Bouligny Plaza. In 1889, the Wakefields, an African-American family from New Iberia, fled to New Orleans after their son was lynched by a white mob; days after the lynching, the family patriarch and former state senator Samuel Wakefield committed suicide on Howard Street. That courthouse served Iberia Parish until 1940. That year, the current courthouse was built along Iberia Street, two blocks from the New Iberia downtown commercial district.

In September 2008, New Iberia was struck by Hurricane Ike. The lakes overflowed and filled the city, flooding it under several feet of dirty, brown water. On December 14, 2022, the southeastern part of the city was heavily damaged by a high-end EF2 tornado, injuring 16 people.

== Geography ==
New Iberia is located in southern Louisiana, in the Acadiana region. The city of New Iberia is a part of the Lafayette metropolitan area. According to the United States Census Bureau, the city has a total area of 10.6 square miles (27.4 km^{2}), all land. In 2000, the population density was 3,088.8 inhabitants per square mile (1,192.6/km^{2}). The 12,880 housing units had an average density of 1,219.5 per square mile (470.9/km^{2}). New Iberia lies roughly 16 to 20 feet above mean sea level.

Among the lakes near the city is Lake Peigneur, which was formerly a 10-foot (3.0 m) deep freshwater lake until a 1980 disaster involving oil drilling and a salt mine. The lake is now a 1,300-foot (400 m) deep saltwater lake, having been refilled by the Gulf of Mexico via the Delcambre Canal. Also, Lake Tasse is better known as Spanish Lake. This region has many natural features of interest, such as Avery Island, famous for its Tabasco sauce factory, deposits of rock salt, and Jungle Gardens.

=== Climate ===
New Iberia experiences a subtropical climate with above-average rainfall. As of 2021, annual average high temperature is 79.1 °F (26.2 °C) and the annual low is 59.4 °F (15.2 °C).

Climate data for New Iberia, Louisiana (Acadiana Regional Airport), 1991–2020 normals, extremes 1998–present
Month	Jan	Feb	Mar	Apr	May	Jun	Jul	Aug	Sep	Oct	Nov	Dec	Year
Record high °F (°C)	81 (27)	85 (29)	87 (31)	92 (33)	98 (37)	103 (39)	104 (40)	106 (41)	101 (38)	96 (36)	88 (31)	83 (28)	106 (41)
Mean maximum °F (°C)	77.3 (25.2)	79.7 (26.5)	83.5 (28.6)	87.5 (30.8)	92.0 (33.3)	96.7 (35.9)	97.4 (36.3)	97.7 (36.5)	95.4 (35.2)	91.3 (32.9)	83.7 (28.7)	80.1 (26.7)	99.2 (37.3)
Mean daily maximum °F (°C)	62.7 (17.1)	66.5 (19.2)	72.9 (22.7)	79.2 (26.2)	85.6 (29.8)	90.2 (32.3)	91.5 (33.1)	92.4 (33.6)	89.0 (31.7)	81.8 (27.7)	72.0 (22.2)	65.1 (18.4)	79.1 (26.2)
Daily mean °F (°C)	52.9 (11.6)	56.7 (13.7)	62.7 (17.1)	68.9 (20.5)	76.1 (24.5)	81.4 (27.4)	82.9 (28.3)	83.2 (28.4)	79.6 (26.4)	70.7 (21.5)	60.8 (16.0)	55.0 (12.8)	69.2 (20.7)
Mean daily minimum °F (°C)	43.1 (6.2)	46.9 (8.3)	52.5 (11.4)	58.6 (14.8)	66.7 (19.3)	72.5 (22.5)	74.3 (23.5)	74.0 (23.3)	70.1 (21.2)	59.6 (15.3)	49.6 (9.8)	44.9 (7.2)	59.4 (15.2)
Mean minimum °F (°C)	26.9 (−2.8)	32.8 (0.4)	34.5 (1.4)	43.9 (6.6)	54.5 (12.5)	66.8 (19.3)	70.5 (21.4)	69.9 (21.1)	60.0 (15.6)	42.9 (6.1)	32.5 (0.3)	29.9 (−1.2)	25.3 (−3.7)
Record low °F (°C)	2 (−17)	18 (−8)	25 (−4)	38 (3)	45 (7)	62 (17)	67 (19)	62 (17)	50 (10)	35 (2)	27 (−3)	20 (−7)	2 (−17)
Average precipitation inches (mm)	5.36 (136)	3.54 (90)	2.91 (74)	4.82 (122)	4.39 (112)	6.46 (164)	6.71 (170)	6.37 (162)	5.05 (128)	5.09 (129)	4.50 (114)	4.49 (114)	59.69 (1,515)
Average precipitation days (≥ 0.01 in)	10.5	9.4	9.3	8.3	8.0	13.1	15.4	14.4	10.9	9.5	9.4	10.5	128.7
Source 1: NOAA
Source 2: National Weather Service (mean maxima/minima 2006–2020)

== Demographics ==
Historical population
Census	Pop.	Note	%±
1850	306		—
1870	1,472		—
1880	2,709		84.0%
1890	3,447		27.2%
1900	6,815		97.7%
1910	7,499		10.0%
1920	6,278		−16.3%
1930	8,003		27.5%
1940	13,747		71.8%
1950	16,467		19.8%
1960	29,062		76.5%
1970	30,147		3.7%
1980	32,766		8.7%
1990	31,828		−2.9%
2000	32,623		2.5%
2010	30,617		−6.1%
2020	28,555		−6.7%
2025 (est.)	26,533	▼	−7.1%
U.S. Decennial Census

New Iberia racial composition as of 2020
Race	Number	Percentage
White (non-Hispanic)	12,697	44.47%
Black or African American (non-Hispanic)	12,575	44.04%
Native American	74	0.26%
Asian	800	2.8%
Pacific Islander	1	0.0%
Other/mixed	963	3.37%
Hispanic or Latino	1,445	5.06%

As of the 2020 United States census, 28,555 people, 11,030 households, and 7,338 families were residing in the city. The 2019 American Community Survey estimated 29,456 people resided in the city limits. At the 2010 U.S. census, the population of New Iberia was 30,617. At the census of 2000, 32,623 people, 11,756 households, and 8,335 families resided in the city.

Of the population in 2019, New Iberians lived in 13,455 housing unit with 11,030 households. New Iberia's population had a sex ratio of 96.2 males per 100 females. The city had a median age of 36.2 and 7,671 were under 18, 2,609 were under 5, and 21,785 were 18 or older. An estimated 4,268 households were married couples living together, 784 were cohabiting households, 2,273 were male households with no female present, and 3,705 were female households with no male present. The average household size was 2.63, and the average family size was 3.24.

In 2000 of the 11,756 households, 36.6% had children under 18 living with them, 45.1% were married couples living together, 20.5% had a female householder with no husband present, and 29.1% were not families. About 25.2% of all households were made up of individuals, and 10.8% had someone living alone who was 65 or older. The average household size was 2.70, and the average family size was 3.24. In the city, the age distribution was 29.8% under 18, 9.7% from 18 to 24, 26.8% from 25 to 44, 20.4% from 45 to 64, and 13.3% who were 65 or older. The median age was 34 years. For every 100 females, there were 87.8 males. For every 100 females 18 and over, there were 83.6 males.

The 2019 census estimates determined New Iberia a median income of $38,221 and mean income of $54,126. At the 2000 census, the median income in the city for a household was $26,079 and for a family was $30,828. Males had a median income of $30,289 versus $16,980 for females. The per capita income for the city was $13,084. About 24.9% of families and 29.5% of the population were below the poverty line, including 40.8% of those under 18 and 20.8% of those 65 or over.

=== Race and ethnicity ===
New Iberia had a racial and ethnic makeup of 51.6% non-Hispanic Whites, 40.7% Blacks or African Americans, 0.1% American Indians and Alaska Natives, 1.4% Asian, 2.1% some other race, and 2.1% multiracial Americans. Hispanics or Latino Americans of any race made up 3.8% of the total population in 2019. After the 2020 census, its racial and ethnic makeup was 44.47% non-Hispanic White, 44.04% Black or African American, 0.26% American Indian and Alaska Native, 2.8% Asian, 3.37% from two or more races, and 5.06% Hispanic or Latino American of any race. At the 2000 census, the racial makeup of the city was 56.99% White, 38.42% African American, 0.21% Native American, 2.64% Asian, 0.02% Pacific Islander, 0.51% from other races, and 1.20% from two or more races; 1.49% of the population were Hispanic or Latino American of any race.

=== Religion ===
In common with most of Louisiana, most New Iberians profess a religion. New Iberia is dominated by Christianity, and the single largest Christian denomination in the city is the Roman Catholic Church, owing in part to the Spanish and French heritage of its residents. Catholics in New Iberia and the surrounding area are served by the Roman Catholic Diocese of Lafayette in Louisiana. Of the religious population, 0.1% each practice Judaism or an eastern religion.

== Economy ==
The city of New Iberia was the founding headquarters for Bruce Foods before their relocation to Lafayette; it was also the birthplace of Trappey's Hot Sauce. Currently, the economy is stimulated by small businesses, agriculture, New Iberia station, Louisiana Hot Sauce, and Acadiana Regional Airport.

== Arts and culture ==
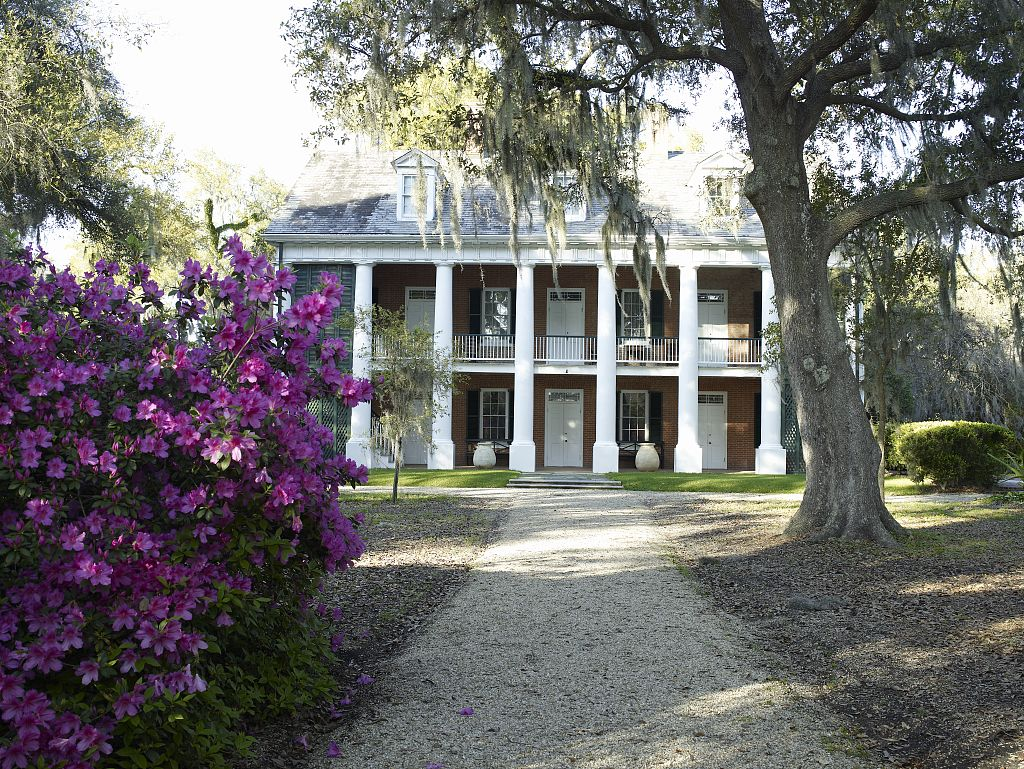
Shadows-on-the-Teche historic house in New Iberia in 2007

=== Places of interest ===
- Shadows-on-the-Teche historic former residence and plantation, now owned by the National Trust for Historic Preservation.
- The Bayou Teche Museum has exhibits on the history, culture, artists and industries of the Bayou Teche region. Location of artist George Rodrigue's last studio.
- Avery Island, home of Tabasco sauce and claims to be the oldest salt mine in North America. In operation since 1862.
- Jungle Gardens, botanical garden and bird sanctuary located in Avery Island.
- Jefferson Island is a former salt mine, botanical garden, rookery, nursery, as well as the historic Victorian Joseph Jefferson House.
- Conrad Rice Mill is on the National Register of Historic Places, oldest rice mill in operation since 1912, offering public tours.
- The city used to hold a statue of the Roman emperor, Hadrian. It was located on the corner of Weeks and St. Peter Streets, until approx. 2008 when it was sold.

=== Festivals ===
New Iberia hosts the Louisiana Sugar Cane Festival in September. The Sugar Cane Festival celebrates the commencement of the sugar cane harvest, locally referred to as grinding. Sugar cane is a principal crop grown by New Iberia farmers. The city also hosts El Festival Español de Nueva Iberia, which honors the area's Spanish heritage. Other notable festivals include the World Championship Gumbo Cook-Off, on the second full weekend in October; and the Books Along the Teche Literary Festival, in April, which celebrates James Lee Burke and South Louisiana literature.

=== Popular culture ===
New Iberia is home to fictional detective Dave Robicheaux, and it was once home to his creator, author James Lee Burke.

The Air-Conditioned Nightmare (1945) travelogue book mentions Henry Miller's stay in New Iberia. In the Electric Mist, a movie based on one of Burke's novels, was filmed in New Iberia in 2009 and starred Tommy Lee Jones.

== Education ==
=== Public schools ===
Iberia Parish School System serves the city and parish area.

==== High schools ====
- Catholic High School
- New Iberia Senior High School
- Westgate High School
- Highland Baptist Christian School

==== Middle schools ====
- Anderson Middle School
- Belle Place Middle School
- Iberia Middle School

==== Elementary schools ====
- Belle Place Elementary
- Caneview Elementary
- Center Street Elementary
- Coteau Elementary
- Daspit Elementary
- Jefferson Island Road Elementary
- Johnston-Hopkins Elementary
- Magnolia Elementary
- North Lewis Elementary
- North Street Elementary
- Park Elementary
- Pesson Elementary
- Sugarland Elementary

=== Private schools ===
- Acadiana Christian School is a private nondenominational Protestant K-12 School in New Iberia.
- Catholic High School (of the Roman Catholic Diocese of Lafayette in Louisiana) is a private Catholic grades 4-12 school in New Iberia.
- Highland Baptist Christian School is a private Baptist K-12 school in New Iberia.

=== Colleges and universities ===
Iberia Parish is in the service area of Fletcher Technical Community College and of South Louisiana Community College.

== Notable people ==
This is a list of notable people from New Iberia, Louisiana. It includes people who were born/raised in, lived in, or spent portions of their lives in New Iberia, or for whom New Iberia is a significant part of their identity. This list is in order by career and in alphabetical order by last name.

=== Actors ===
- Joseph Jefferson, artist and actor who portrayed Rip Van Winkle on the stage.
- Yvonne Levy Kushner, French-Jewish American actress, born in New Iberia.
- Peter Renaday, voice actor
- Christian J. Simon, child actor and voice actor, born in New Iberia

=== Authors and journalists ===
- James Lee Burke, novelist, mystery writer.
- Glenn R. Conrad, author, professor, and historian of south Louisiana culture, a native of New Iberia.
- Pableaux Johnson, New Orleans–based writer, photographer, and cook
- Louis Lautier, the first African-American journalist admitted in 1955 to the White House Correspondents' Association,

=== Artists and designers ===
- Jamie Baldridge, artist, photographer, arts educator, writer. Born and raised in New Iberia
- Rosa Lee Brooks, artist, blues singer; born in New Iberia and raised in Los Angeles, California
- William Eckart, set designer for film, stage and television, born in New Iberia
- Alyce Frank, southwestern landscapes painter born in New Iberia
- William Weeks Hall, painter and photographer
- George Rodrigue, artist and creator of the Blue Dog series of paintings
- Owen Southwell, architect, and native of New Iberia

=== Business ===
- William Dore, businessman, founder of Global Industries, Ltd., born and raised in New Iberia.
- Paul Fleming, restaurateur, born in New Iberia.
- Bryan Lourd, Partner, managing director and co-chairperson of CAA

=== Politics and civil service ===
- Taylor Barras, state representative and Speaker of the Louisiana House of Representatives in 2016
- Kathleen Blanco, former Governor of Louisiana from 2004 to 2008
- Edwin S. Broussard, U.S. senator from 1921 to 1933
- Robert F. Broussard, U.S. representative from 1897 to 1915 and U.S. senator from 1915 to 1918
- Patrick T. Caffery, attorney, member of the Louisiana House of Representatives and U.S. Representative
- W. Eugene Davis, U.S. Fifth Circuit Court of Appeals Judge from 1983 until present
- John Duhe, U.S. Fifth Circuit Court of Appeals Judge from 1988 to 2011
- Ted Haik, state representative from Iberia, St. Mary, and Vermilion parishes (1976–96)
- Billy Hewes, Mississippi politician
- Jeff Landry, Governor of Louisiana (2024-), lived in New Iberia
- Wilbert J. Le Melle, American diplomat, author and academician. Born in New Iberia.
- Blake Miguez, state senator and former state representative

=== Music ===
- Bunk Johnson, Dixieland jazz musician and trumpet player
- Soko Richardson, rhythm and blues drummer

=== Sports ===
- Kermit Alexander, defensive back (San Francisco 49ers, 1963–1969)
- Alton Alexis, wide receiver (Cincinnati Bengals, 1980) (CFL Calgary Stampeders, 1981–1982)
- Kayshon Boutte, wide receiver (New England Patriots, 2023)
- Jon Emminger, professional wrestler working for WWE as Lucky Cannon
- Howie Ferguson, NFL player (Green Bay Packers, 1953–1958)
- Damon Harrison, NFL player, former New York Jets player, currently with New York Giants
- Johnny Hector, running back (New York Jets, 1983–1992)
- Willie Hector, NFL player
- Kerry Joseph, CFL quarterback
- Morgann LeLeux, 2021 Olympic Women's Pole Vault
- Jared Mitchell, outfielder for the Chicago White Sox
- Corey Raymond, cornerback for the NY Giants and coach.
- Mark Roman, NFL defensive back, Cincinnati Bengals, Green Bay Packers, and San Francisco 49ers
- Diontae Spencer, CFL wide receiver and return specialist, born in New Iberia.
- Tyrunn Walker, NFL defensive lineman, former New Orleans Saints player.

=== Science ===
- Norman F. Carnahan, chemical engineer
- Viola Mary Johnson Coleman, African-American female physician

== Sister cities ==
- Woluwe-Saint-Pierre, Brussels, Belgium
- Saint-Jean-d'Angély, Nouvelle-Aquitaine, France
- Alhaurín de la Torre, Andalusia, Spain
- Fuengirola, Andalusia, Spain

== See also ==
- National Register of Historic Places listings in Iberia Parish, Louisiana
