= Terhune House =

Terhune House may refer to:

- Terhune–Hopper House (Ho-Ho-Kus, New Jersey), listed on the NRHP in Bergen County
- Terhune–Ranlett House, Ho-Ho-Kus, New Jersey, listed on the NRHP in Bergen County
- Terhune House (Paramus, New Jersey), listed on the NRHP in Bergen County
- Terhune–Gardner–Lindenmeyr House, Paramus, New Jersey, listed on the NRHP in Bergen County
- Terhune–Hopper House (Upper Saddle River, New Jersey), listed on the NRHP in Bergen County
- Terhune House (Wyckoff, New Jersey), listed on the NRHP in Bergen County
