= Owen Southwell =

American architect

- Born: Owen James Trainor Southwell; September 20, 1892; New Iberia, Louisiana, U.S.
- Died: April 7, 1961 (aged 68)
- Other name: Owen J. T. Southwell
- Education: Carnegie Mellon University
- Occupation: Architect
- Buildings: St. Peter's Church

Owen James Trainor Southwell (1892–1961) was an American architect who practiced in the early 1900s in Atlanta, Georgia; Beaumont, Texas; and New Iberia, Louisiana. His architecture style was a mixture of Southern Greek revival, other revival styles, and antebellum.

== Biography ==
Southwell was born September 20, 1892, in New Iberia, Louisiana, to parents Catherine Trainor and William D. Southwell. Southwell's father lived in New York between 1885 and 1888 while studying architecture, returning to New Iberia to open an architecture practice in 1888. Southwell attended high school in Beaumont, Texas. Southwell attended Tulane University for two years before transferring to Carnegie Institute of Technology (now known as Carnegie Mellon University), where he graduated with a bachelor's degree in architecture in 1915. At Carnegie Tech he studied with architect Henry Hornbostel. Between 1914 and 1916, Southwell was hired as an instructor of architecture at University of Illinois at Urbana-Champaign.

During World War I, Southwell served in the Naval Reserve. He was married to Yvonne Arnandez (1895–1993).

He lived in Atlanta from 1919 to 1931, moving there to manage Henry Hornbostel's local architecture office. During the early years in Atlanta, Southwell worked on designing early buildings for Emory University. By 1923, Southwell opened his own private architecture practice in Atlanta. In 1931, Southwell moved back to New Iberia because of the Great Depression, and moving his private architecture practice with him.

Southwell died in April 1961, at the age of 68, and is buried in Saint Peter's Cemetery in New Iberia.

== Notable buildings ==
- 1888–1953 – Old St. Peter's Church in New Iberia, Louisiana (now demolished)
- 1927 – Sardis United Methodist Church, Atlanta, Georgia
- 1928 – Caed Mile Failte, the John Henry Phelan mansion and 15.4-acre estate in Beaumont, Texas
- c.1936 – Buddha House at the Jungle Gardens in Avery Island, Louisiana
- 1937 – Essanee Theater in New Iberia, Louisiana
- 1953 – St. Peter's Church in New Iberia, Louisiana (same location as the earlier church)
- 1951 – Sugar Festival Building in New Iberia, Louisiana
