= Bob Acres, Louisiana =

Unincorporated community in Louisiana, U.S.

Coordinates: 29°56′55″N 91°57′55″W

Bob Acres is a small unincorporated community in rural Iberia Parish, Louisiana, United States. It was established as a train station by American actor Joseph Jefferson, who owned nearby Orange Island (now Jefferson Island, Louisiana), an inland salt dome that only appeared to be an island from a distance. Jefferson named Bob Acres after the character Bob Acres in The Rivals, one of the plays in which the actor appeared.

== See also ==
- Joseph Jefferson House
