= Jungle Gardens =

Botanical garden and bird sanctuary on Avery Island, Louisiana

Coordinates: 29°54′40″N 91°54′40″W

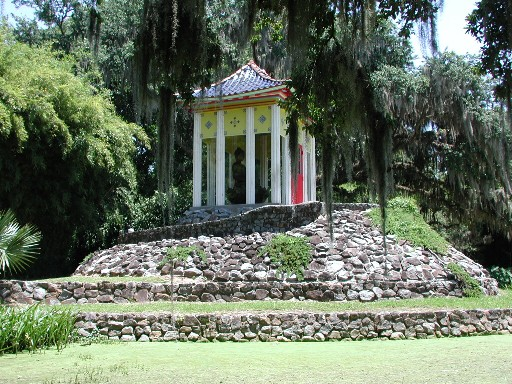
A Buddha temple in Avery Island's Jungle Gardens.

Jungle Gardens is a 170-acre (0.69 km^{2}) botanical garden and bird sanctuary located on Avery Island, Louisiana (near the town of New Iberia). Jungle Gardens is open every day of the year, except major holidays. An admission fee is charged.

== About ==
The gardens were created by Edward Avery McIlhenny, second son of Edmund McIlhenny, the inventor of Tabasco sauce.

One of Jungle Gardens' primary attractions is a bird sanctuary called Bird City. It provides roosts for snowy egrets and other wildfowl species.

In 1895 McIlhenny raised eight egrets in captivity on the island, and released them in the fall for migration. They returned the next spring with other egrets, and have continued to do so over generations. Today thousands of egrets inhabit the island from early spring to late summer. Numerous American alligators, Louisiana black bears, and white-tailed deer also inhabit the island, in addition to coypu, North American river otters, muskrats, snakes, and other wild animals.

The gardens are planted with azaleas, Japanese camellias, hydrangeas, Louisiana irises, palms, papyrus sedges, bamboo, and wisteria. Four miles of gravel roads are lined with live oak trees and Spanish moss. There are also many walking paths.

=== Buddha temple ===
A glass temple set within a Chinese garden, houses a Chinese Buddha from circa 1100 AD given to McIlhenny in 1936 by two friends. According to the story, in the 1920s a Chinese warlord from a feuding territory sent the Buddha statue to New York City and it sat in a warehouse storage until its shipment to Louisiana. McIlhenny built an Asian-influenced garden setting for the statue on one of the seven "Hills of Knowledge" including a pond, arched bridge and glass-enclosed shrine. Owen J. T. Southwell was the architect that designed the Buddha shrine structure.

== See also ==
- List of botanical gardens in the United States
