= Van Blarcom House (Wyckoff, New Jersey) =

Historic house in New Jersey, United States

- U.S. National Register of Historic Places
- New Jersey Register of Historic Places
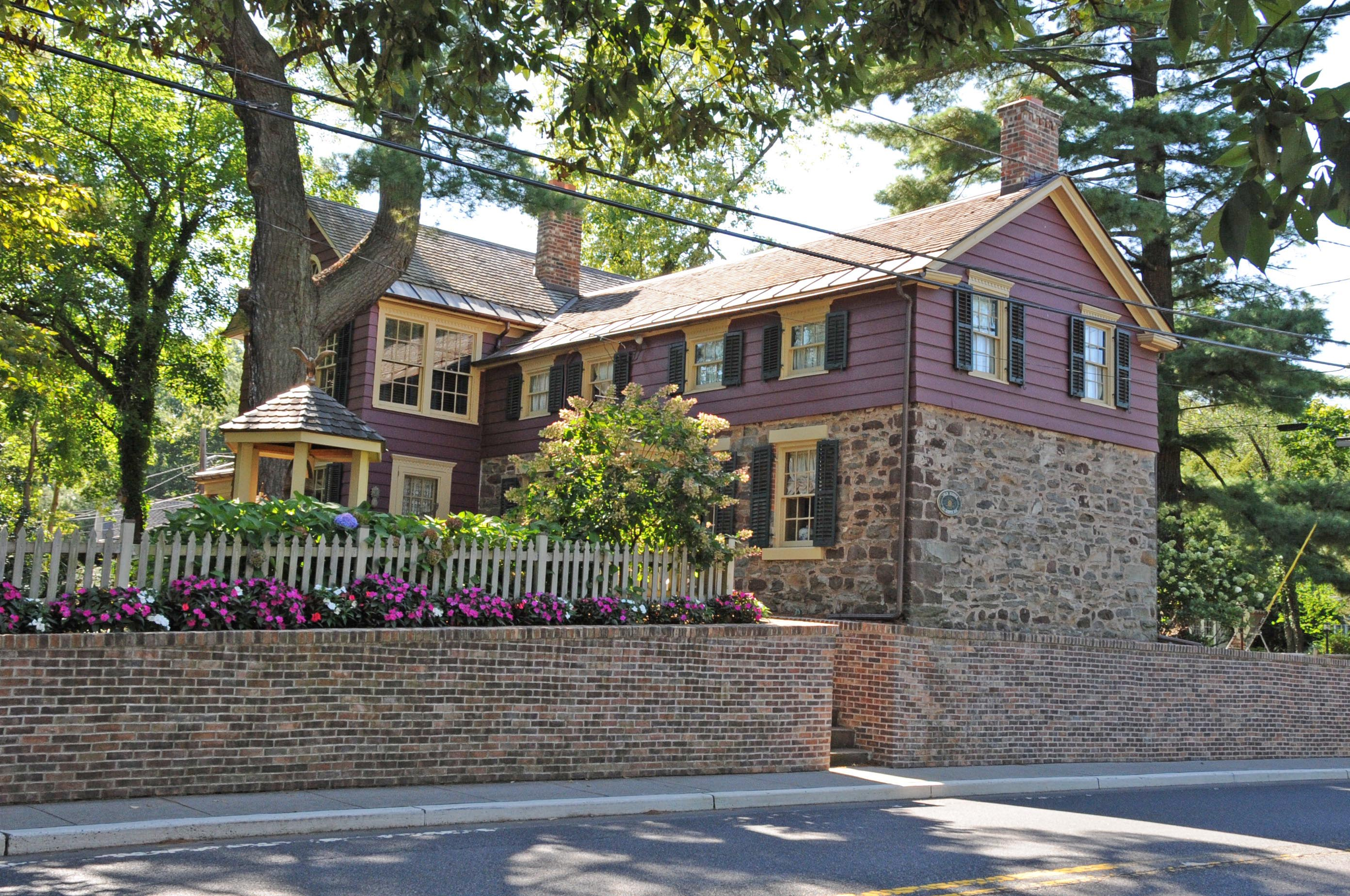

- Location within Bergen County, New Jersey Location within New Jersey Location within the United States
- Location: 131 Godwin Avenue, Wyckoff, New Jersey
- Coordinates: 41°0′7″N 74°9′29″W
- MPS: Stone Houses of Bergen County TR
- NRHP reference No.: 83001556
- NJRHP No.: 737

Significant dates
- Added to NRHP: January 10, 1983
- Designated NJRHP: October 3, 1980

The Van Blarcom House is a historic stone house located at 131 Godwin Avenue in the township of Wyckoff in Bergen County, New Jersey, United States. The house was once owned by Peter Van Blarcom and was added to the National Register of Historic Places on January 10, 1983, for its significance in architecture and exploration/settlement. It was listed as part of the Early Stone Houses of Bergen County Multiple Property Submission (MPS). The two and one-half story Old Stone house is considered a sister house to the nearby Terhune House. The house is on land that was purchased in 1745 by Johannis Van Zile.

== See also ==
- National Register of Historic Places listings in Wyckoff, New Jersey
- National Register of Historic Places listings in Bergen County, New Jersey
