= Joseph Jefferson =

American actor and author (1829–1905)

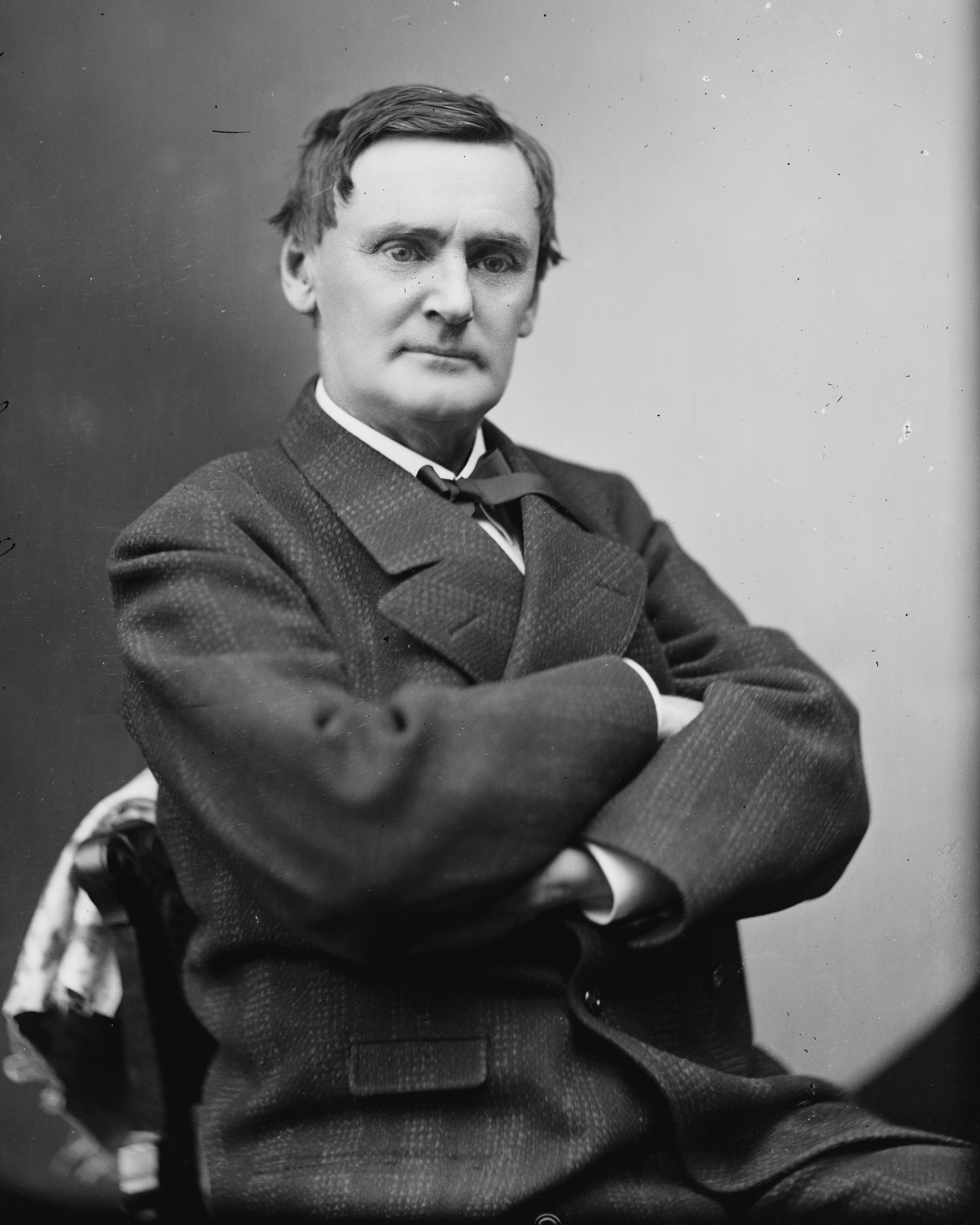
- Jefferson, 1870–1880
- Born: Joseph Jefferson III; February 20, 1829; Philadelphia, Pennsylvania, U.S.
- Died: April 23, 1905 (aged 76); Palm Beach, Florida, U.S.
- Burial place: Sandwich, Massachusetts, U.S.
- Occupation: Actor
- Spouses: Margaret Clements Lockyer; Sarah Warren

Joseph Jefferson III (February 20, 1829 – April 23, 1905), often known as Joe Jefferson, was an American actor. He was the third actor of this name in a family of actors and managers, and one of the most famous 19th century American comedians. Beginning as a young child, he continued as a performer for most of his 76 years. Jefferson was particularly well known for his adaptation and portrayal of Rip Van Winkle on the stage, reprising the role in several silent film adaptations. After 1865, he created no other major role and toured with this play for decades.

== Life and career ==
Jefferson was born in Philadelphia, Pennsylvania. His father, Joseph Jefferson Jr., was a scenic designer and actor and his mother an actress. He appeared onstage early in life, often being used when a play called for "a babe in arms". His first recorded appearance was at the Washington Theatre in Washington, D.C., where he appeared in a benefit performance for the minstrel Thomas D. Rice.

Jefferson was married twice: at the age of 21 in 1850, to actress Margaret Clements Lockyer (1832–1861), who died young after bearing their four children. After Jefferson returned to the United States after the end of the Civil War, he married again in 1867 to Sarah Warren. She was the niece of British-American actor William Warren.

=== Early career ===
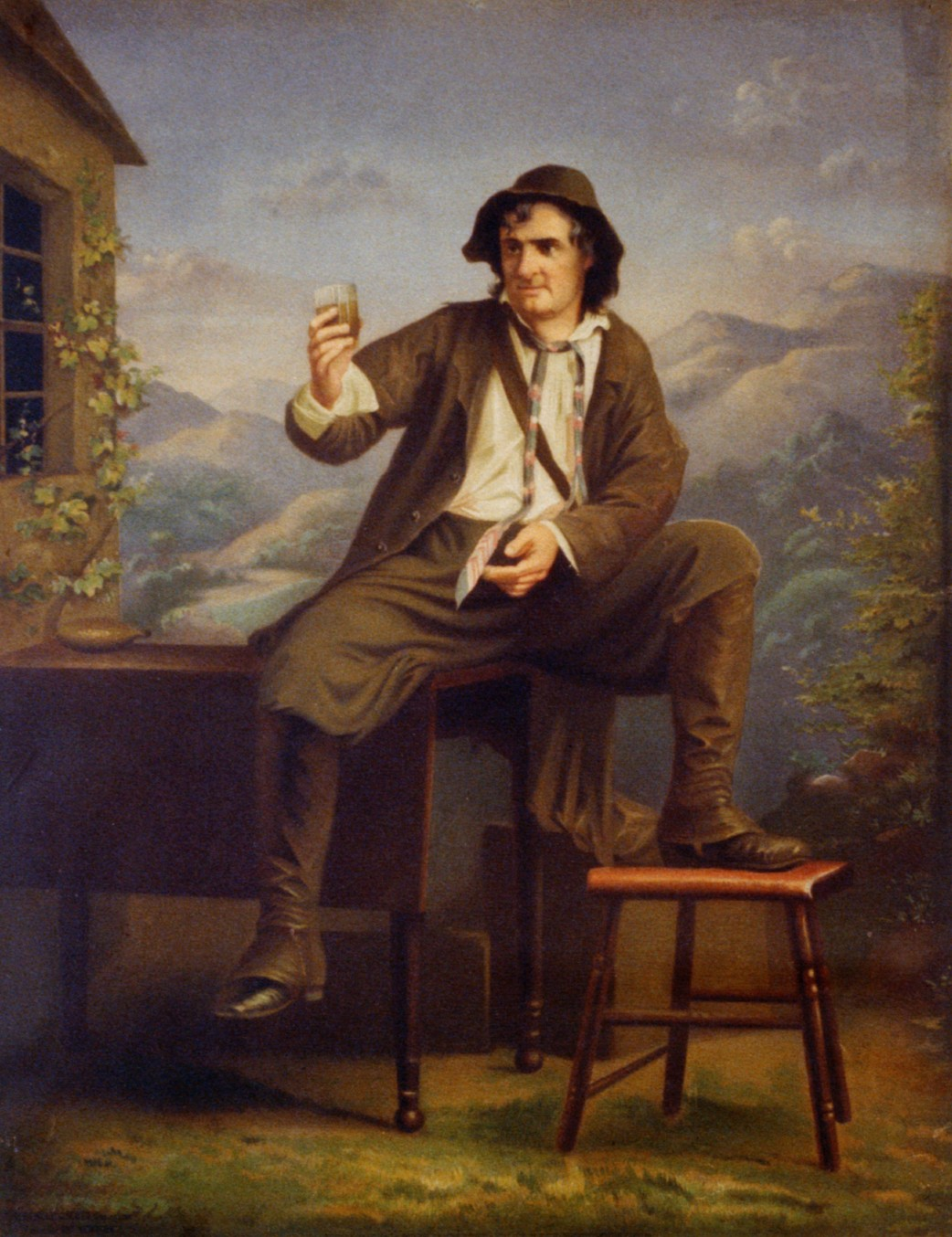
Jefferson as the young Rip Van Winkle

In 1833, at the age of four years, Jefferson was carried on stage at the Washington theatre in a bag by an actor named Thomas D. Rice. He put Jefferson alongside him in black face and dress with Rice performing his well-known character "Jim Crow" and little Joseph as Little Joe. In 1837, at age eight, Joseph performed at the Franklin Theatre in New York City with his parents as a pirate. After the end of the 1837–38 season, his parents moved with Joseph, his brother Charles Burke, and his sister, Cornelia, to Chicago. There they performed in the young city's first resident company, the Chicago Theater, at the rough-hewn Sauganash Hotel. Joseph sang comic songs, played bit parts, and performed the role of the Duke of York.

His father died when he was 13, and young Jefferson continued acting and helping to support the family. Both Jefferson and Burke performed continuously, and the entire family toured in what was then considered the American West and South. Traveling theatre to theatre, Jefferson performed and worked everywhere in between Boston to Charleston as far as Chicago. The family led the lives of "strolling players", essentially itinerant actors.

At one point they followed the American army from 1846 to 1848 during the Mexican–American War. Jefferson learned to perform in a variety of space, for instance in the dining rooms of country hotels, without any stage or scenery. He put together makeshift footlights by mounting tallow candles on a strip board nailed to the floor. He was one of the seven founding members of the Actors' Order of Friendship, a benevolent society founded in Philadelphia in 1849. He also served as the Order's first Secretary. It was not until after he returned to New York in 1849 that he began earning critical success and financial rewards.

After this experience, partly as actor, partly as manager, he won his first pronounced success in 1858 as Asa Trenchard in Tom Taylor's Our American Cousin at Laura Keene's Theatre in New York. This play was the turning-point of his career, as it would be for actor E. A. Sothern. Jefferson revealed a new spirit in comedy, at a time when actors were long used to a more artificial convention. He also portrayed pathos in the part.

Other early parts included Newman Noggs in Nicholas Nickleby, Caleb Plummer in Dot (an adaption of The Cricket on the Hearth), Dr. Pangloss in George Colman the Younger's The Heir at Law, Salem Scudder in The Octoroon, and Bob Acres in The Rivals. The actors created this part beyond what Sheridan appears to sketch.

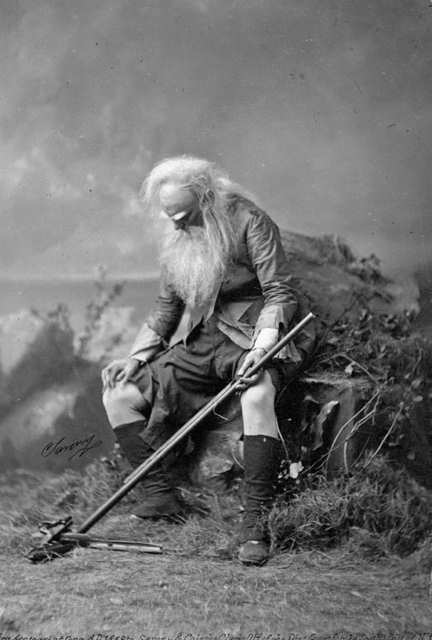
Jefferson as the old Rip Van Winkle, 1896

In 1859, Jefferson made a dramatic adaptation of Washington Irving's story of "Rip Van Winkle", drawing from older plays. He acted it with success in Washington, D.C., with Sophie Gimber Kuhn playing the role of Lowenna.

=== Australia and London ===
In 1861, due to his failing health and the death of his wife, he moved to San Francisco and then sailed to Australia. He arrived at Sydney in the beginning of November 1861, and played a successful season. He performed in and produced Rip Van Winkle, Our American Cousin, The Octoroon, and other plays. He opened in Melbourne on March 31, 1862, and had a most successful season extending over about six months. He continued to act there and in Tasmania. In his spare time in Australia he was a painter, specialising in landscapes.

Jefferson started writing while he was abroad in Australia, and on his way back to America in 1865 he heard news of the end of the war and Abraham Lincoln's assassination by John Wilkes Booth. This news was particularly weight bearing due to Jefferson's personal connection to both parties. Jefferson and Booth were acquaintances and Booth's brother was one of Jefferson's closest friends and Lincoln was one of the Jeffersons family benefactors almost a decade earlier. Jefferson, who was generally known for being just as fun loving and alive as he was on stage as one of the most brilliant comedic actors of the nineteenth century, did not show any visible reaction to the news. However, his son Charley recounted that the news "jolted his father and sent him into uncharacteristic despondency." This jolting news sent Jefferson's sails to England instead of America, where he would begin to throw himself into his work. With the help of play doctor Dion Boucicault, Rip Van Winkle took to the stage that very year, opening at the Adelphi Theatre in London September 4, 1865. In London, the play was less of a success compared to Jefferson's acting job. A London theatre historian several decades later recounted, "No truer, more pathetic, or purely artistic piece of acting, within its limits, has ever been seen upon the English stage than Jefferson's rendering of Washington Irving's vagabond hero." Dion Boucicault, who revised Rip Van Winkle, turned it into "a pronounced success and [it] ran for one hundred and seventy nights." With opening night on September 5, 1865 at the Adelphi Theatre in London, Jefferson portrayed what would become one of the most celebrated characters of the 19th-century stage.

=== Later years ===
Jefferson returned to America in August 1866. He continued acting in Rip Van Winkle for 40 years, creating no new character except for minor ones. He was known for this single character, and admired for his success in London and Australia.

As John Maguire wrote in 1909, "It was then that America greeted the return of the wanderer, proud of the victory of an American actor in an American play in foreign lands. This fame added to the glory of his country, both at home and abroad…" Returning to America, Jefferson made it his stock play, making annual tours of the states with it, and occasionally reviving The Heir at Law in which he played Dr. Pangloss, The Cricket on the Hearth (Caleb Plummer), and The Rivals (Bob Acres). He was elected to The Lambs Theatre Club as an Honorary Lifetime member in 1890, and was one of the first to establish the traveling troupes who superseded the old system of local stock companies.

Jefferson also starred in a number of films as the Van Winkle character, starting in the 1896 Awakening of Rip. This is held in the U.S. National Film Registry. Jefferson's son Thomas followed in his father's footsteps and played the character in a number of early 20th-century silent films. Joseph Jefferson made several recordings, all of material from Rip Van Winkle.

Jefferson essentially created no new character after 1865, except for minor parts. He was known as a one-part actor. The public never wearied of his one masterpiece. Francis Wilson wrote in 1906, "He was Rip and Rip was he." Jefferson was rewarded by the theater community with being elected lifetime president of The Players Club.

In 1869, Jefferson bought a place called Orange Island in New Iberia, Louisiana. There he built a large home. The site is on a peninsula on Lake Peigneur; the peninsula became known as Jefferson Island in his honor.

Jefferson died from pneumonia on April 23, 1905, at his home in Palm Beach, Florida.

== Legacy ==
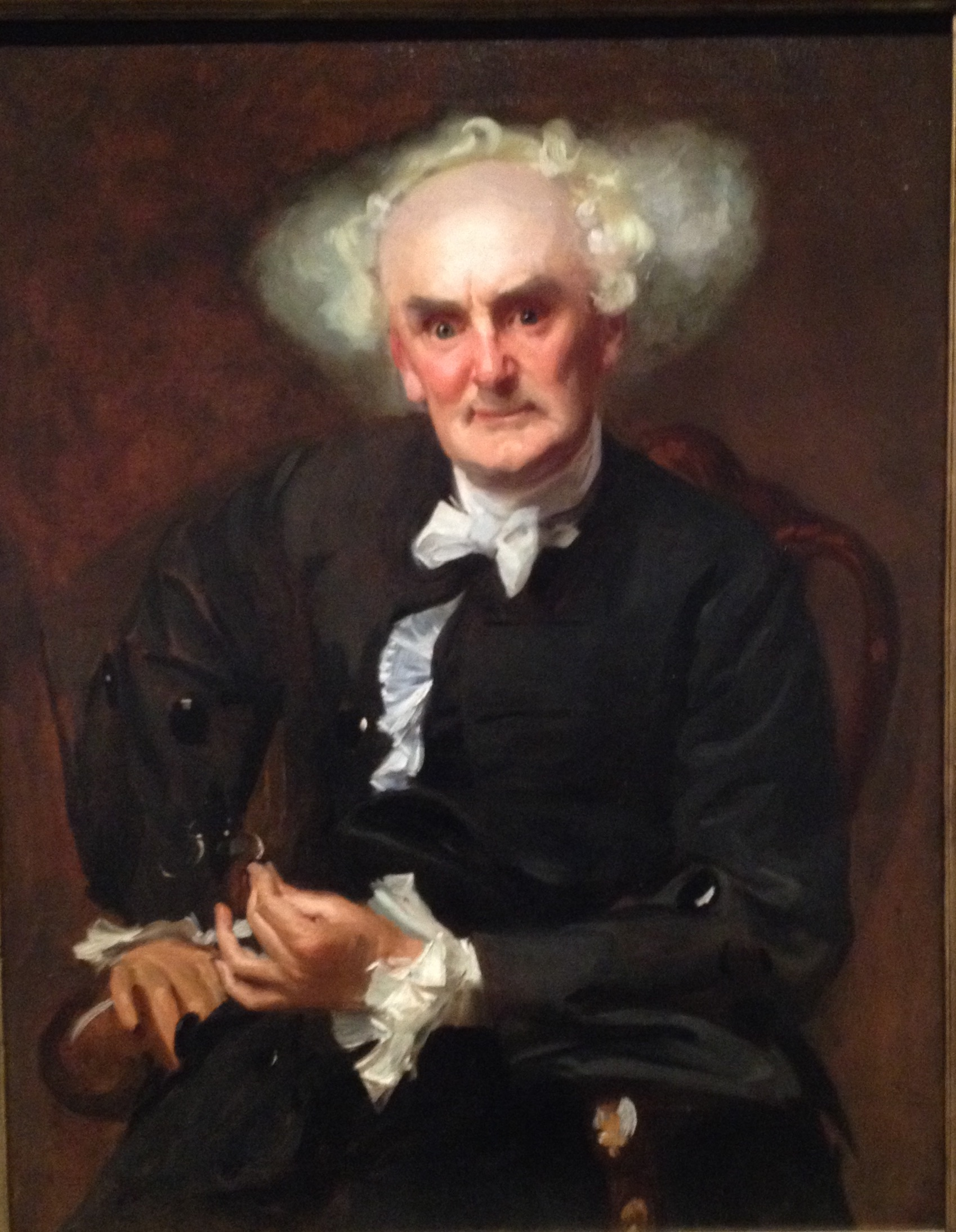
Joseph Jefferson as Dr. Peter Pangloss by John Singer Sargent

Jefferson's name continues to live on through the Joseph Jefferson Awards Committee in Chicago which offers awards in recognition of excellence of Chicago's Equity and non-Equity theaters and their productions. Jefferson Island in Mashpee, Massachusetts, which was once known as Stayonit Island, is named for him.

The Joe Jefferson Players, a theatre playhouse founded in Mobile, Alabama in 1947, took their name from Jefferson.

His former home on Jefferson Island, the Victorian-era Joseph Jefferson Mansion (built 1870) is now listed in the National Register of Historic Places (NRHP) and is operated via private ownership but is open to the public. Surrounding the home are the Rip Van Winkle Gardens, 20 acres of gardens which were rebuilt in the 1950s through the 1980s and contain a 550 year old oak tree that Grover Cleveland once slept under. His former home in Ho-Ho-Kus, New Jersey, also known as the Joe Jefferson House, is listed on the NRHP. His former property in Saddle River, New Jersey was turned into a fishing club named after him. The Joe Jefferson Clubhouse is listed on the NRHP.

Jefferson's son, Thomas (1856–1932), was a noted actor. He occasionally played the Rip Van Winkle character, including in some silent feature films.

Writer Joseph Jefferson Farjeon, son of his daughter Margaret Jefferson (1853–1935), was named after him.

The 1919 silent film Deliverance, a biography of Helen Keller and Annie Sullivan, includes a scene where the two women visit Jefferson in his dressing room before a performance as Rip Van Winkle. Jefferson's son Thomas portrayed his late father.

In archy and mehitabel, a tomcat tells of his grandfather, a "theatre cat" who played Joseph Jefferson's beard when his prop beard fell off during a performance. This story was used in the musical archy and mehitabel, and in the adaptations of that musical into Broadway, television, and animated film.

Jefferson's birthplace at Sixth and Spruce Streets in Philadelphia is on the Pennsylvania Register of Historic Places, and a memorial plaque has been placed upon the house.

== Publications about Joseph Jefferson ==
- William Winter, The Jeffersons (Boston, 1881)
- Carroll, Twelve Americans: Their Lives and Times (New York, 1883)
- Matthews and Hutton, Actors and Actresses of Great Britain and the United States (New York, 1886)
- Joseph Jefferson, The Autobiography of Joseph Jefferson (New York, 1890)
- N. H. Dole, Joseph Jefferson at Home (Boston, 1898)
- Francis Wilson, Joseph Jefferson (New York, 1906)
- M. J. Moses, Famous Actor-Families in America (New York, 1906)
- Francis Wilson, Reminiscences of a Fellow Player (New York, 1906)
- William Winter, Other Days (New York, 1908)
- E. P. Jefferson, Intimate Recollections of Joseph Jefferson, (New York, 1909)
- Arthur Bloom, Joseph Jefferson: Dean of the American Theatre (Savannah, 2000)
- Benjamin McArthur, "The Man Who Was Rip Van Winkle: Joseph Jefferson and Nineteenth-Century American Theatre" (Yale University Press, 2007)
- Jean Lee Latham, "On Stage, Mr. Jefferson!" (Harper, 1958)
