= Bird City (wildfowl refuge) =

Private bird sanctuary in Louisiana, US

Coordinates: 29°54′22″N 91°54′39″W

Bird City, Avery Island, Louisiana, c. 2005

Bird City is a private wildfowl refuge or bird sanctuary located on Avery Island in coastal Iberia Parish, Louisiana.

It was founded by Tabasco sauce heir and conservationist Edward Avery McIlhenny, whose family owned Avery Island. McIlhenny established the refuge around 1895 on his own personal tract of the 2,200-acre (8.9 km^{2}) island, an approximately 175-acre (0.71 km^{2}) estate known eventually as Jungle Gardens because of its lush tropical flora.

By the late 19th century, plume hunters had nearly wiped out the snowy egret population of the United States in pursuit of the bird's delicate feathers, which were commonly used by milliners for the adornment of ladies' hats.

Alarmed by this trend, McIlhenny searched the Gulf Coast and located several surviving egrets, which he took back to his estate on Avery Island. There he turned the birds loose in a type of aviary he called a "flying cage", where the birds soon adapted to their new surroundings. In the fall McIlhenny set the birds loose to migrate south for the winter.

As he hoped, the birds returned to Avery Island in the spring, bringing with them even more snowy egrets. This pattern continued until, by 1911, the refuge served as the summer nesting ground for an estimated 100,000 egrets.

Because of its early founding and example to others, Theodore Roosevelt, father of American conservationism, once referred to Bird City as "the most noteworthy reserve in the country".

Today, snowy egrets continue to return to Bird City each spring to nest until resuming their migration in the fall.
