= Sophie Gimber Kuhn =

Sophie Gimber Kuhn (8 November 1838 – 1867) was an English actress from Temple Bar, London who came to the United States on a visit with her parents. She performed at the Winter Garden Theatre in September 1860. Her first role was Nelly in All Hallow Eve.

In a production which opened on 24 December 1860, Kuhn played Lowenna in Rip Van Winkle by Washington Irving. The adaptation at the Winter Garden was produced by Joseph Jefferson, who played the part of Rip Van Winkle. In 1863, along with Kate Denin and Lucille Western, Kuhn performed in a stage adaptation of East Lynne at the old Academy of Music in Manhattan.
