= Joe Jefferson Clubhouse =

- U.S. National Register of Historic Places
- New Jersey Register of Historic Places
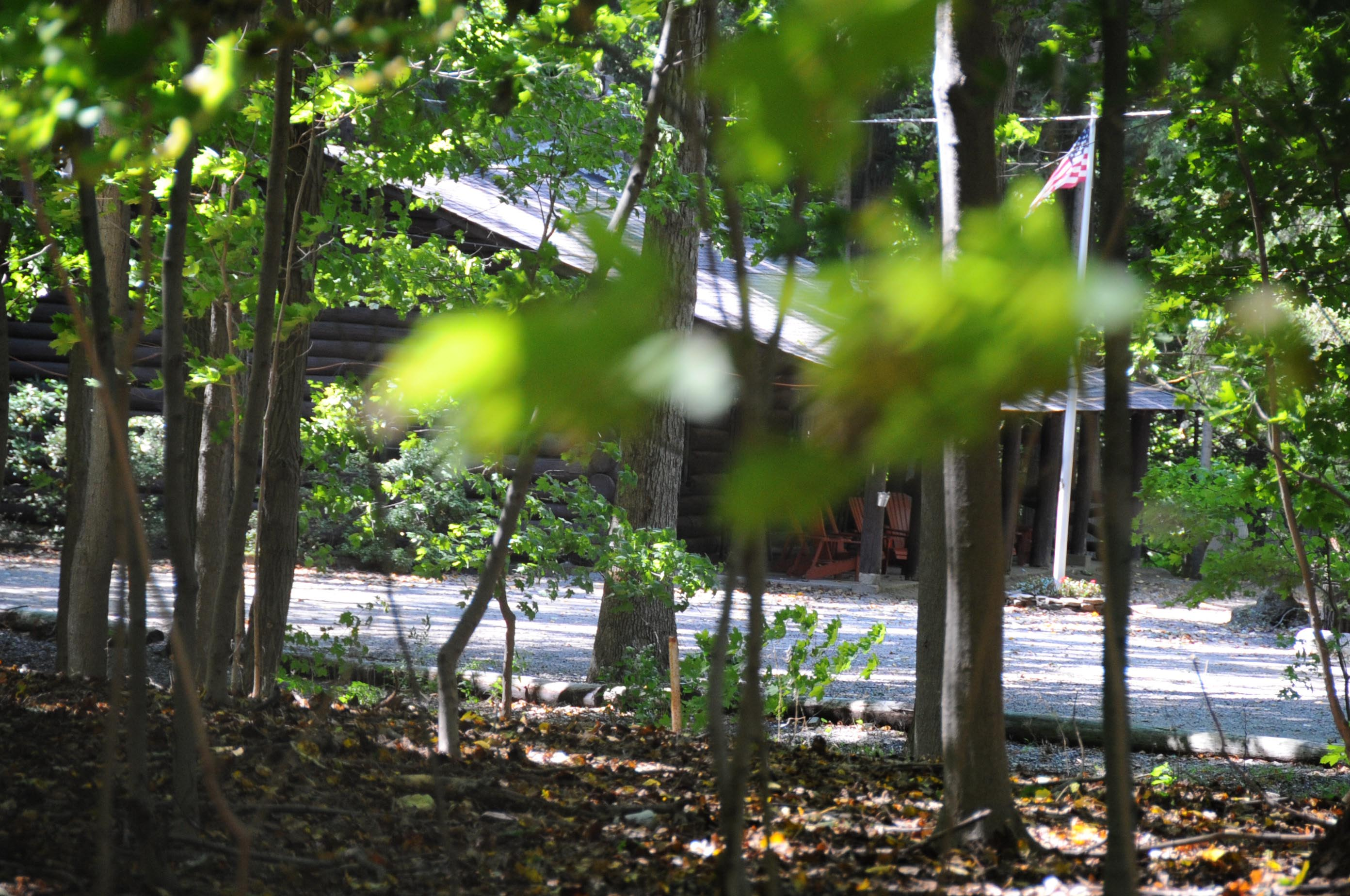

- Location within Bergen County, New Jersey Location within New Jersey Location within the United States
- Location: 29 East Saddle River Road, Saddle River, New Jersey
- Coordinates: 41°0′40″N 74°5′45″W
- Area: 9.5 acres (3.8 ha)
- Built: 1925
- Architectural style: Bungalow/Craftsman, Picturesque bungalow
- MPS: Saddle River MRA
- NRHP reference No.: 86001605
- NJRHP No.: 685

Significant dates
- Added to NRHP: August 29, 1986
- Designated NJRHP: June 13, 1986

The Joe Jefferson Clubhouse is a rustic clubhouse located at 29 East Saddle River Road in the borough of Saddle River in Bergen County, New Jersey, United States. The log building was built in 1925 and was added to the National Register of Historic Places on August 29, 1986, for its significance in architecture and entertainment. It was listed as part of the Saddle River Multiple Property Submission (MPS).

== History and description ==
The property, known as "The Ponds", was purchased by the actor Joe Jefferson in 1874. After his death, five men purchased the property and formed a fishing club named after Jefferson. The clubhouse was built in 1925 from local chestnut logs and retains its original rustic furniture.

== See also ==
- National Register of Historic Places listings in Bergen County, New Jersey
