= Delcambre Canal =

Canal in Louisiana, United States of America

Coordinates: 29.9220°N 91.9769°W

The Delcambre Canal, also known as Bayou Carlin, runs from Lake Peigneur in Louisiana to Vermilion Bay near Weeks Island. It serves to connect the shrimping center of Delcambre to the Gulf of Mexico. It also has a spur connection to Avery Island and crosses the Gulf Intracoastal Waterway. The canal was first dredged in 1906.

In 1980 an oil drilling rig in Lake Peigneur pierced a deep salt mine, causing the lake to drain into the mine. No people died, but the Delcambre Canal flowed backwards feeding gulf waters into the lake until the mine was filled and the lake refilled.
