= Avery Island (Louisiana) =

Avery Island Île Petite Anse
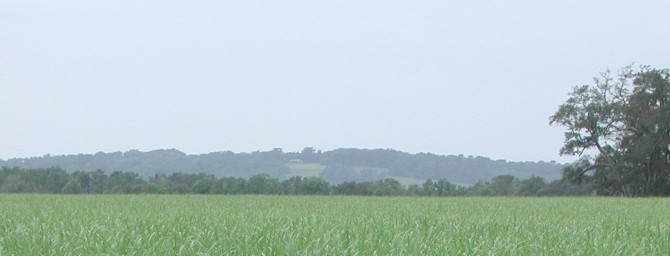
- Avery Island as seen from a distance across a sugarcane field
- Interactive map of Avery Island
- Coordinates: 29°53′51″N 91°54′27″W
- State: Louisiana
- Parish: Iberia
- Established: 1818
- Founder: John Craig Marsh
- Named for: Daniel Dudley Avery
- Time zone: UTC-6 (CST)
  - Summer (DST): UTC-5 (CDT)
- ZIP code: 70513

Avery Island (historically French: Île Petite Anse) is a salt dome best known as the source of Tabasco sauce. Located in Iberia Parish, Louisiana, United States, it is about three miles (4.8 km) inland from Vermilion Bay, which opens onto the Gulf of Mexico. A small human population lives on the island. The island is listed on the National Register of Historic Places.

== History ==
Native Americans discovered that the island's verdant flora covered a precious natural resource: a massive salt dome. They boiled the island's briny spring water to extract salt, which they traded to other tribes as far away as central Texas, Arkansas, and Ohio.

The island had been named Petite Anse Island by 1818, when it was purchased by John Craig Marsh of New Jersey, according to records maintained before 1999 in the Southern Historical Collection at the University of North Carolina at Chapel Hill. Marsh operated a sugar plantation on the island's fertile soil. In 1837, his daughter Sarah Craig Marsh married Daniel Dudley Avery, a jurist from Baton Rouge. In 1849, Avery became co-owner of his in-law's sugar plantation, and in 1855 he became sole owner.

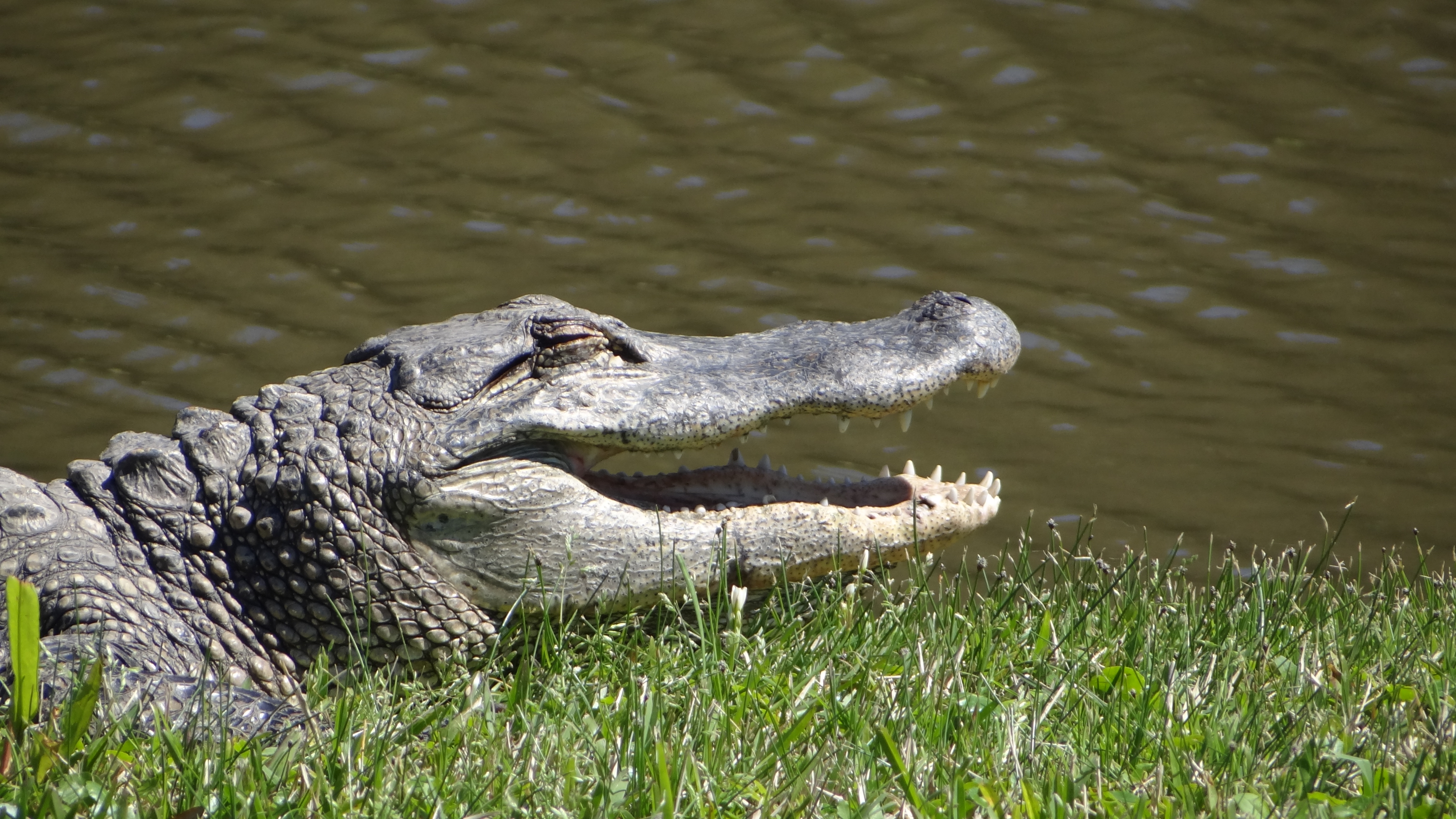
Avery Island wildlife

Edmund McIlhenny joined the Avery family before the Civil War, marrying Daniel and Sarah's daughter Mary Eliza Avery. In 1868, McIlhenny founded McIlhenny Company, and began manufacturing Tabasco brand pepper sauce. In 1870, he received letters patent for his sauce-processing formula. That same basic process is still used today.

In 1938, his son, Edward Avery McIlhenny established a nutria farm on Avery Island, Louisiana, near the factory where the company that bears his family name makes Tabasco sauce. According to company history, McIlhenny bought his stock of nutrias from a farm near New Orleans, so he was not the first to introduce the creature, a native of southern Brazil, Argentina, and Chile, to North America. What is certain, though, is that McIlhenny, for reasons unknown, released an unknown but probably large number of nutrias into the wild from the confines of Avery Island, and from there they fanned out and proliferated.

Avery Island was hit hard in September 2005 by Hurricane Rita. According to The New York Times, the family spent $5 million on constructing a 17-foot (5.2 m)-high levee, pumps, and back-up generators to ensure that future hurricanes will not disrupt Tabasco sauce production.

=== Bird sanctuary ===
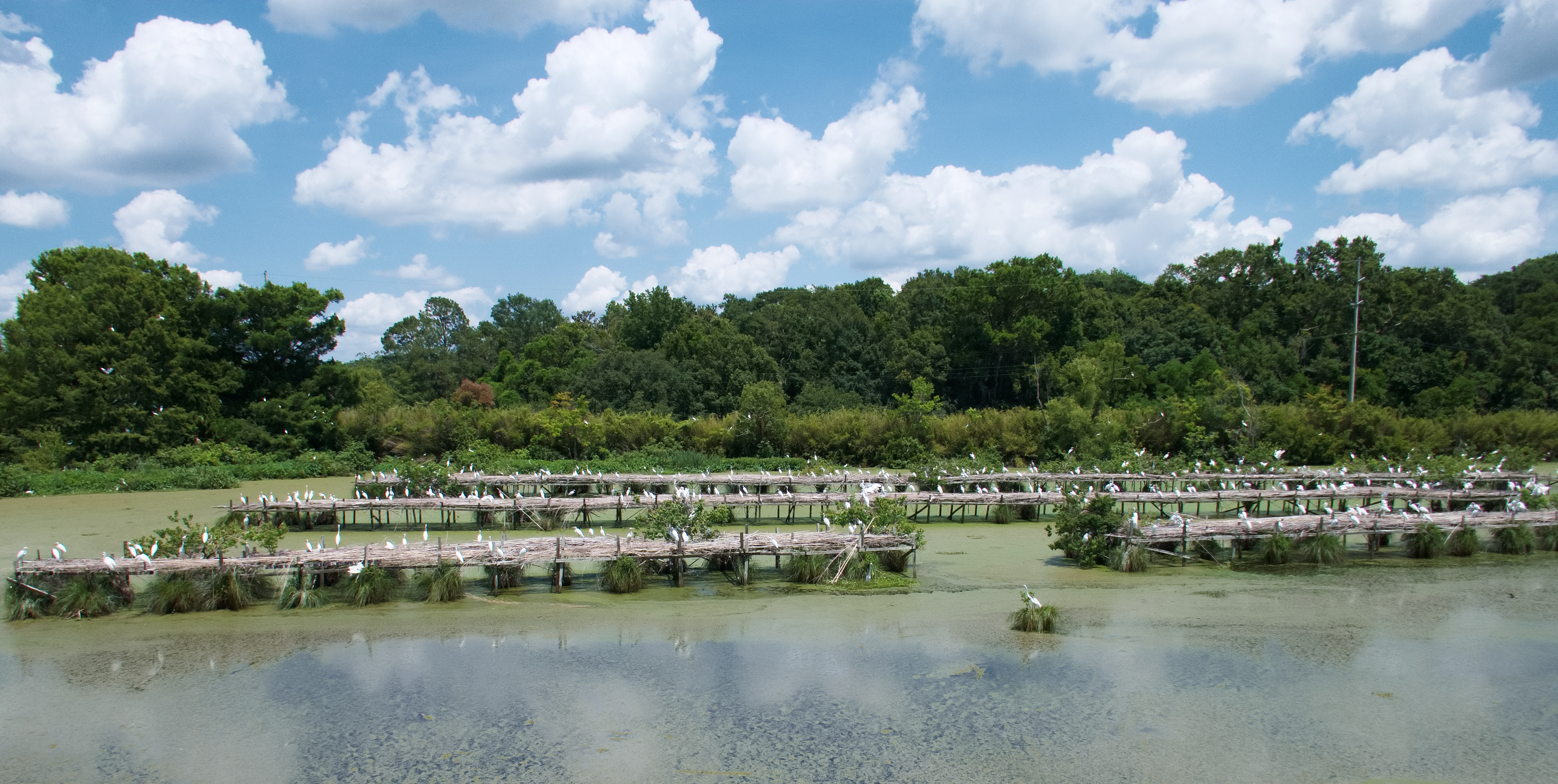
A rookery of egrets on Avery Island

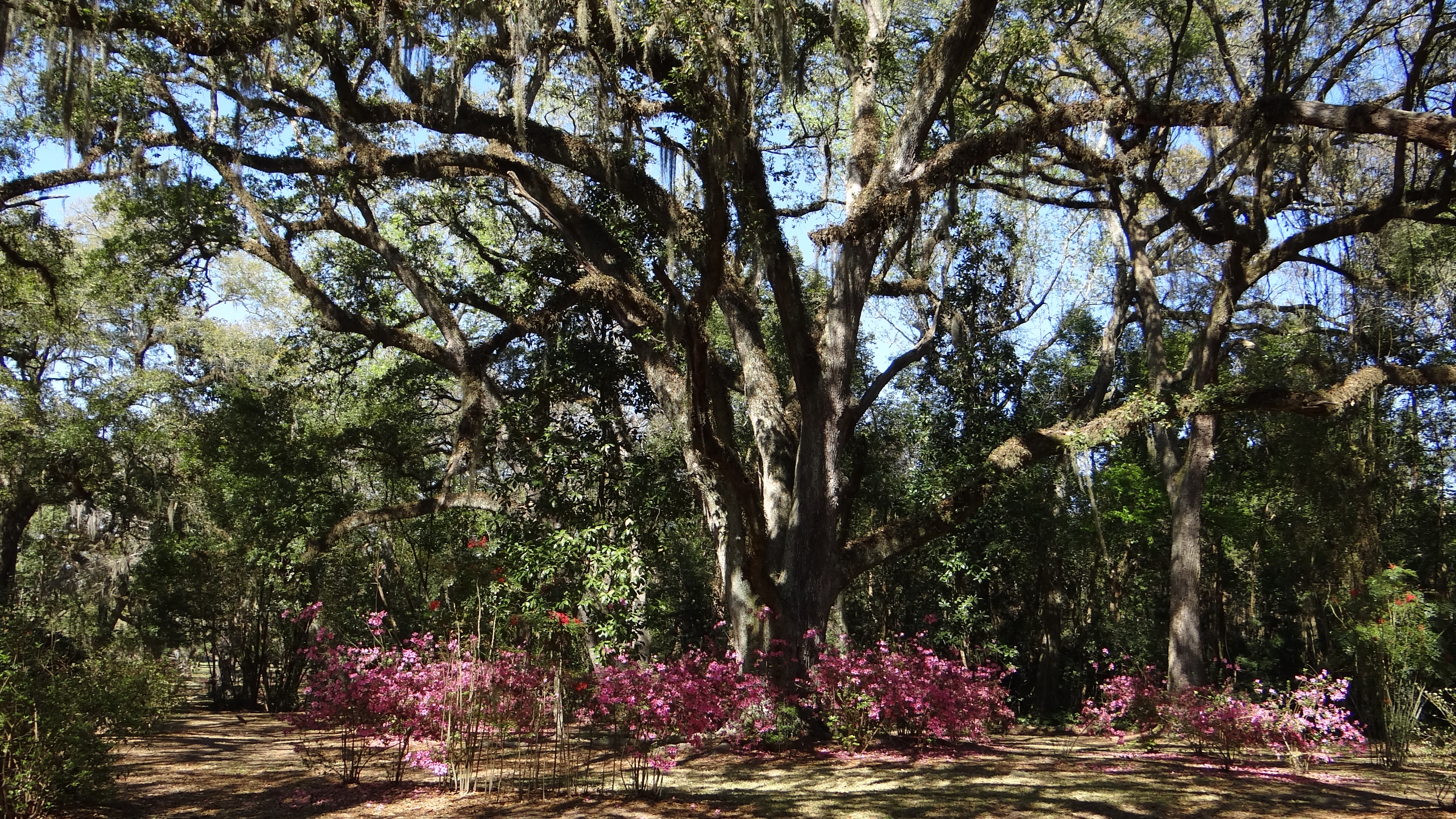
Azaleas at Avery Island

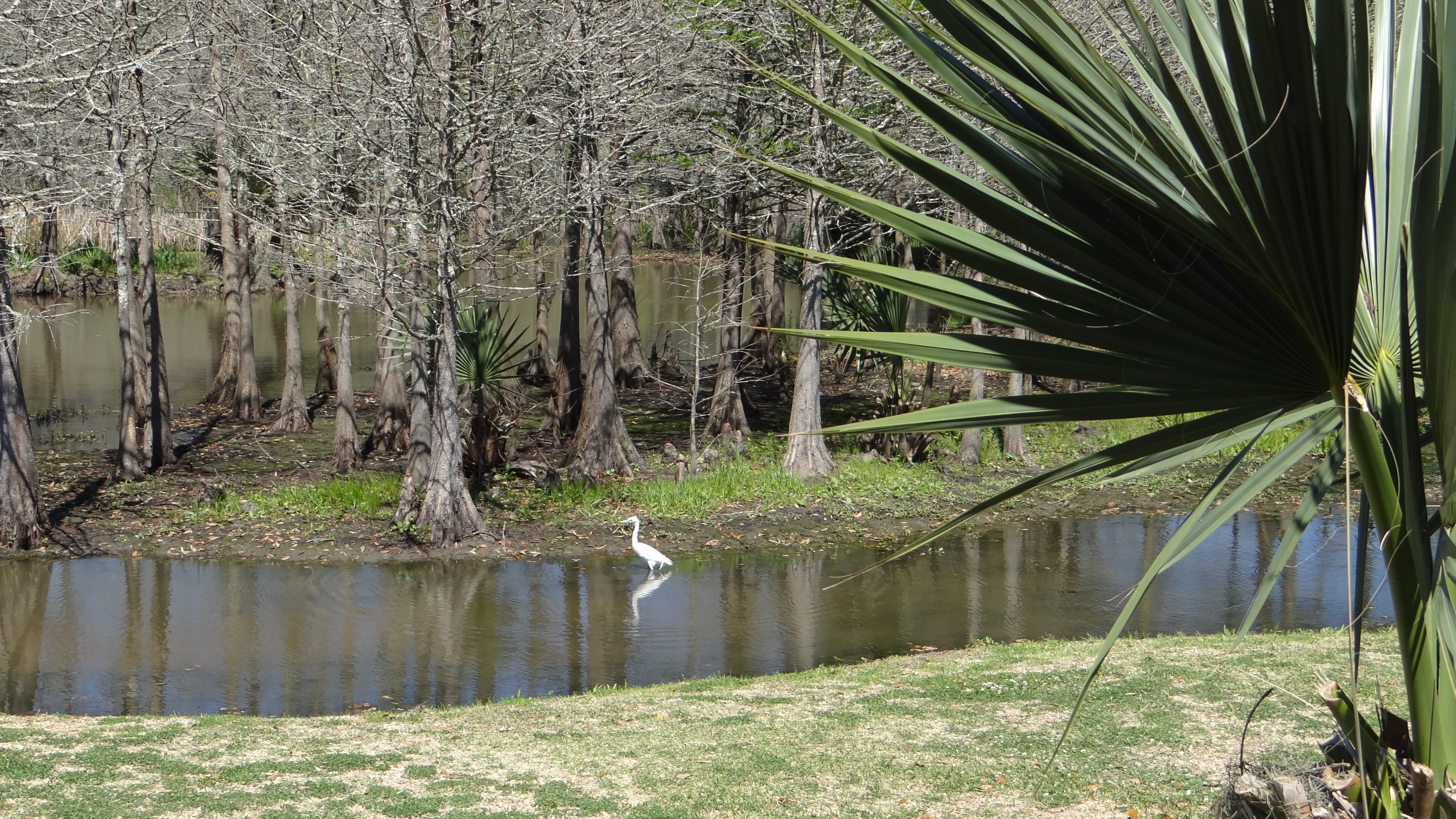
An egret in swamp at Avery Island

Under the Avery/McIlhenny family's management, Avery Island has remained somewhat protected, inhabited by many animal species, although the many plants are non-native. Edward Avery McIlhenny, or "Mr. Ned" as he was affectionately known, founded this bird colony—later called Bird City—around 1895 after plume hunters had slaughtered egrets by the thousands to provide feathers for ladies' hats. Edward gathered eight young egrets, raised them in captivity on the island, and released them in the fall to migrate across the Gulf of Mexico. The following spring the birds returned to the island with others of their species, a migration that continues today.

McIlhenny's illustrated and written documentation of plant and animal life on Avery Island was donated to the Louisiana State University library.

=== Non-native plants ===
Edward McIlhenny introduced numerous varieties of azaleas, camellias, papyrus sedge, and other non-native plants to the Island's ecosystem. When oil was discovered on the Island in 1942, he ensured that production crews bypassed live oak trees and buried pipelines (or painted them green) so the petroleum extraction did not harm the aesthetics.

Today Jungle Gardens and Bird City are open to the public.

== Geography ==
Avery Island is surrounded on all sides by bayous (slow-moving, muddy rivers), salt marsh, and swampland; it sits about 130 miles (210 km) west of New Orleans. The island was a sugar plantation formerly known as Petite Anse Island. (Petite Anse means "Little Cove" in Cajun French.) Access to the island is via a toll road (technically a very low toll bridge), though a toll is no longer charged for visitors, including tourists.

At its highest point, the island is 163 feet (50 m) above mean sea level. It covers about 2,200 acres (8.9 km^{2}) and is about 2.5 miles (4.0 km) across at its widest point.

=== Geology ===
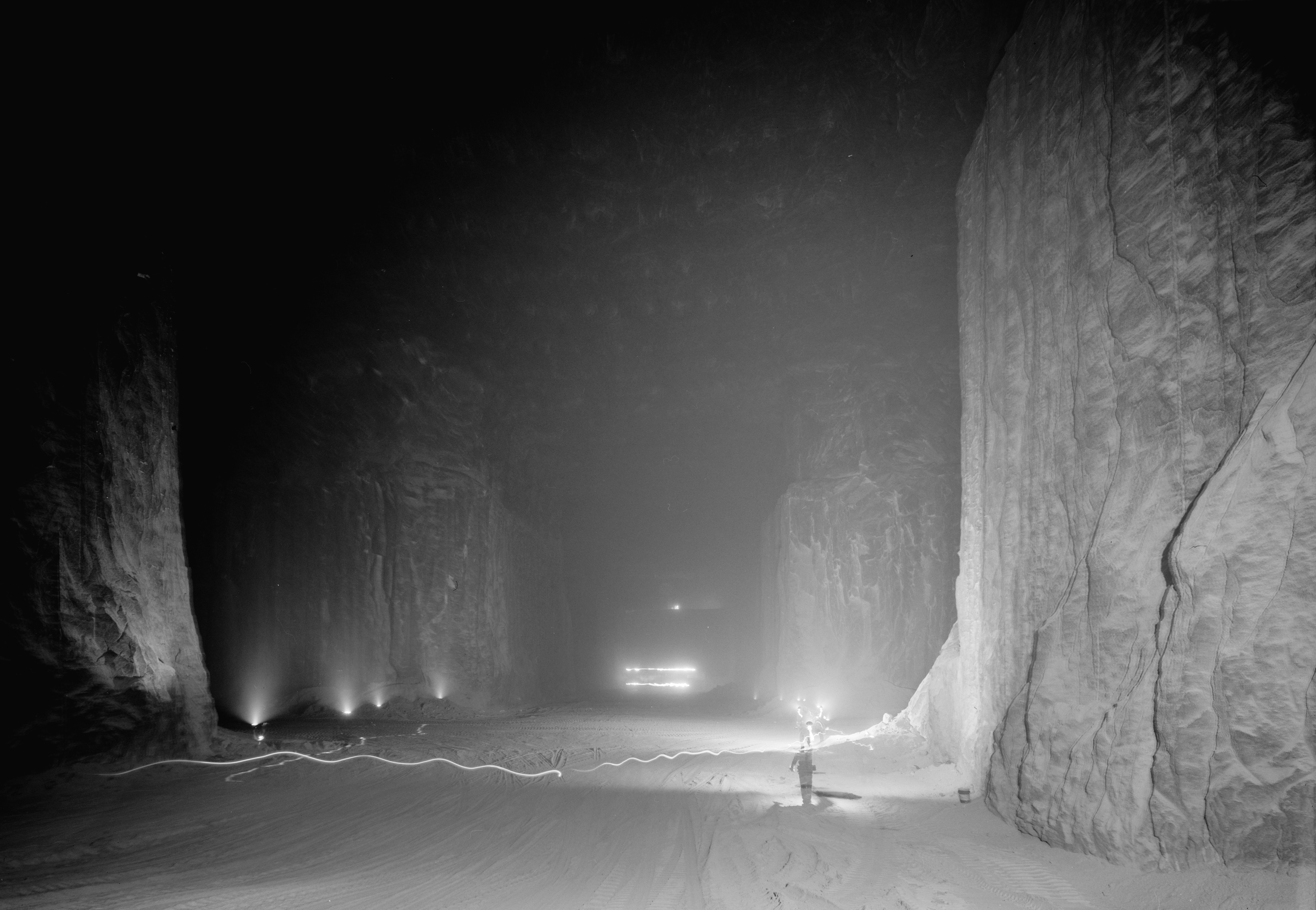
Salt mining on Avery Island

Avery Island is actually a huge dome of rock salt, three miles (4.8 km) long and two and a half miles (4.0 km) wide. It was created by the upwelling of ancient evaporite (salt) deposits that exist beneath the Mississippi River Delta region. These upwellings are known as "salt domes". Avery Island is one of five salt dome islands that rise above the flat Louisiana Gulf coast. The Five Islands from northwest to southeast are Jefferson Island, Avery Island, Weeks Island, Cote Blanche Island and Belle Isle.

== Government and infrastructure ==
The United States Postal Service operates the Avery Island Post Office.

== Education ==
The Iberia Parish School System operates the public schools in the area. Students attend schools in New Iberia. Students are zoned to Center Street Elementary School, Iberia Middle School, and New Iberia Senior High School.

Avery Island Elementary School (K-6) formerly served the community. After the 2007–2008 school year, students from Avery Island Elementary were moved to Center Street Elementary School. At the time, 118 children attended Avery Island Elementary. While Avery Island Elementary operated, it fed into the same middle and high schools that Center Street feeds into: Iberia MS and New Iberia HS.

Iberia Parish is in the service area of Fletcher Technical Community College and of South Louisiana Community College.

== In popular culture ==
- Avery Island is the namesake of indie rock band Neutral Milk Hotel's debut LP On Avery Island.
- Avery Island is the real-world geological inspiration for the spooky "Moonscar Island" featured in the 1998 animated film Scooby-Doo on Zombie Island.
- Avery Island was a filming location for the 1948 film Louisiana Story.
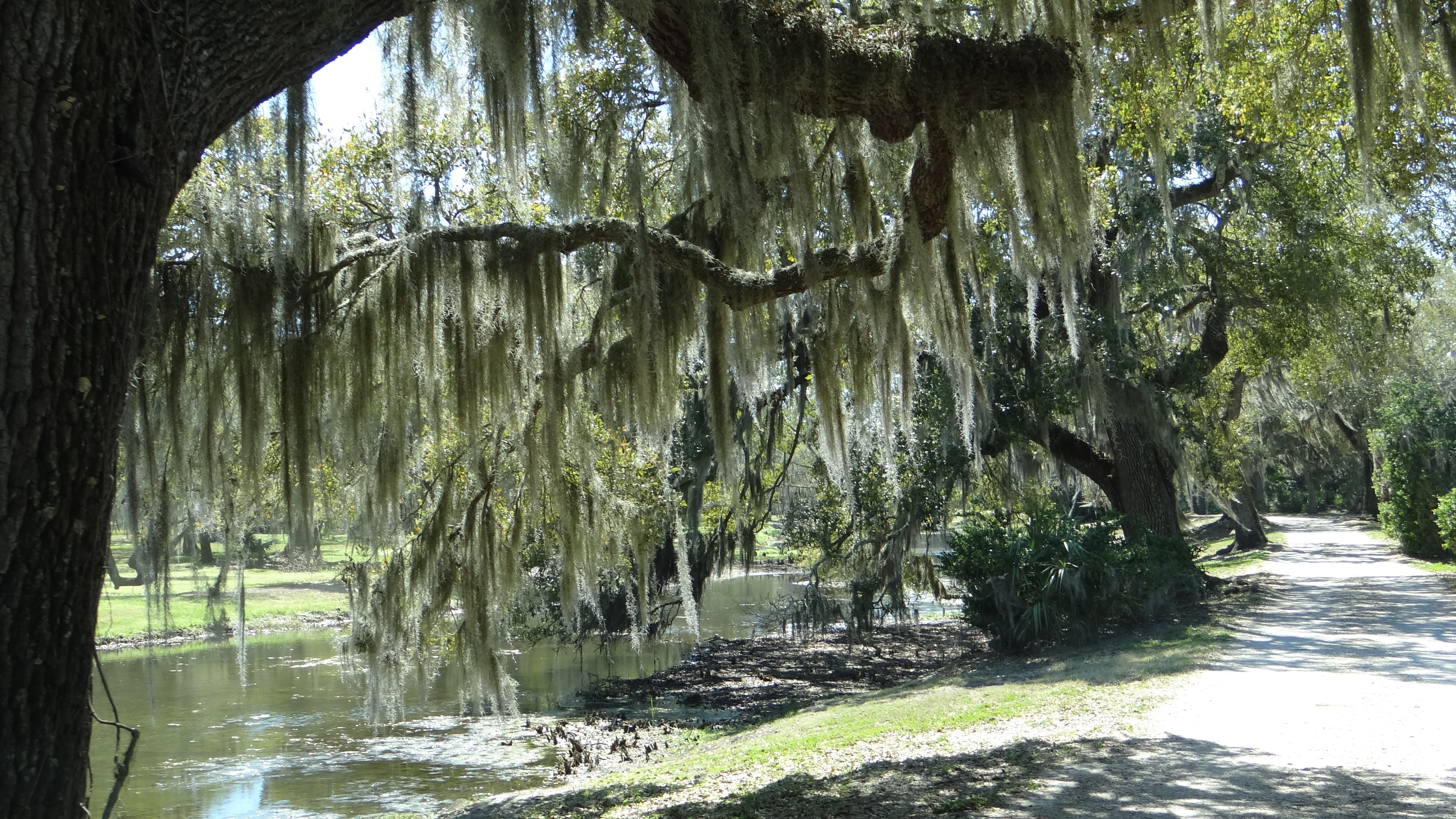
Southern live oaks draped with Spanish moss

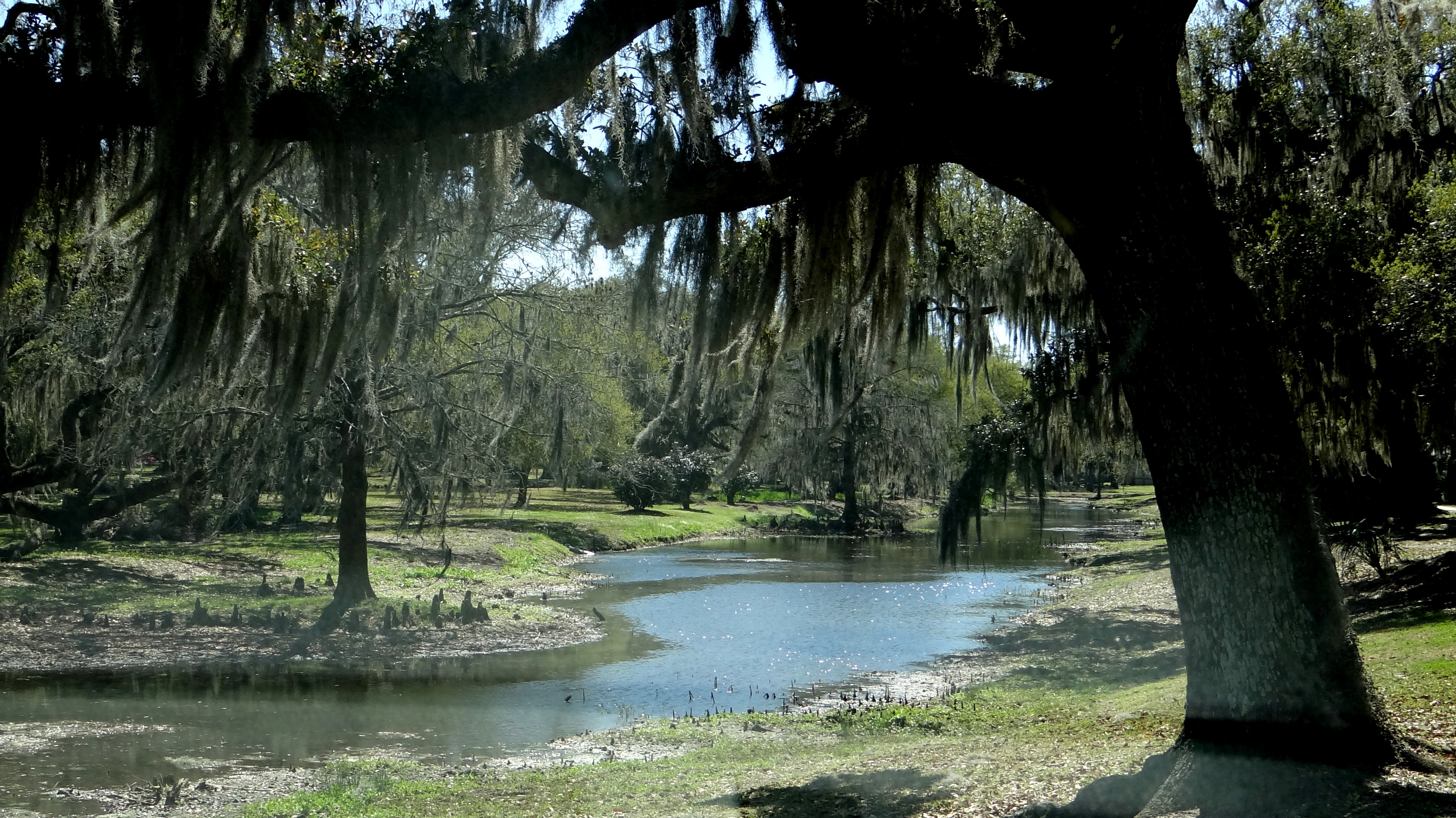
A bayou with oaks, Avery Island

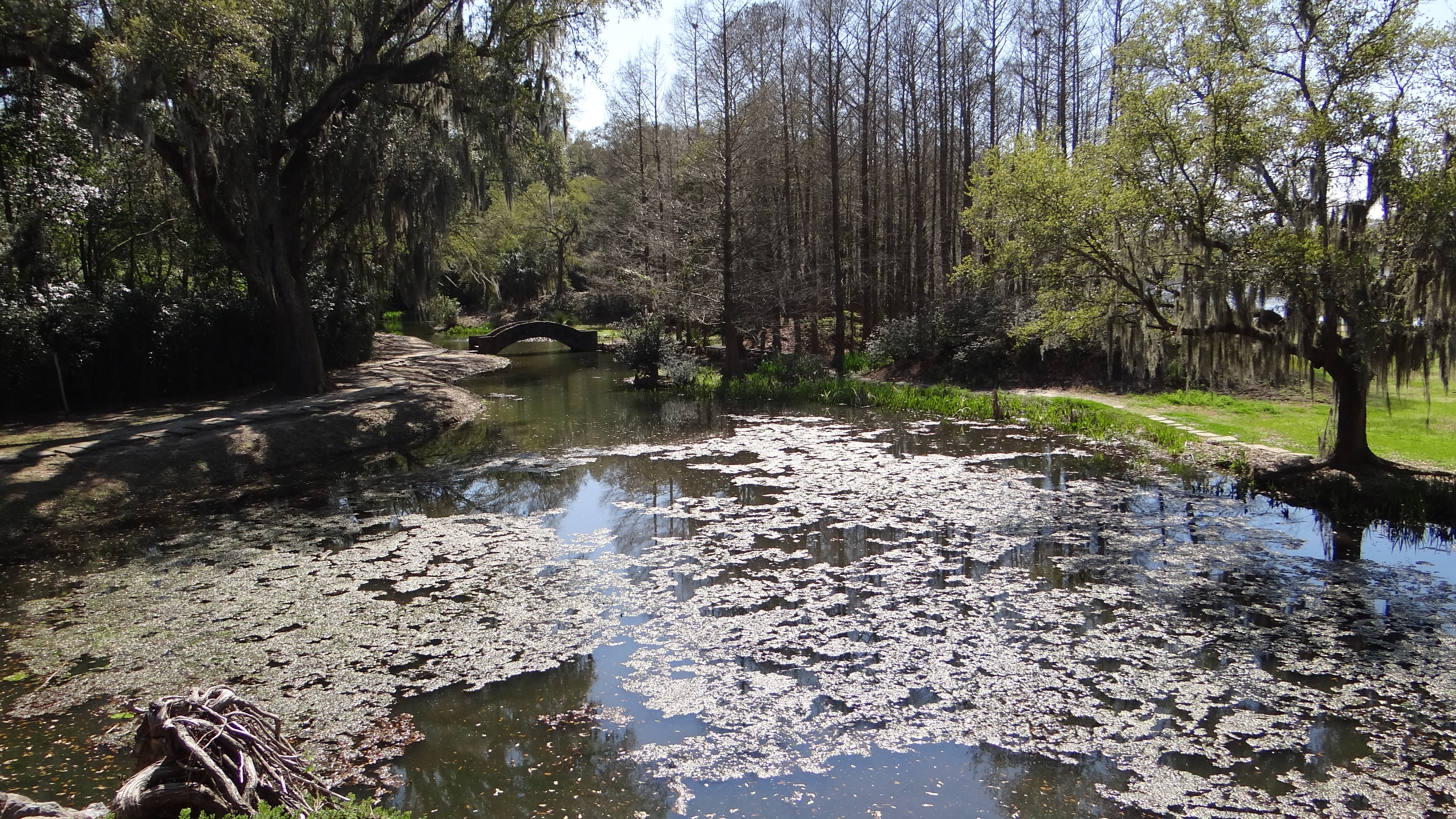
A lake with foot bridge, Avery Island

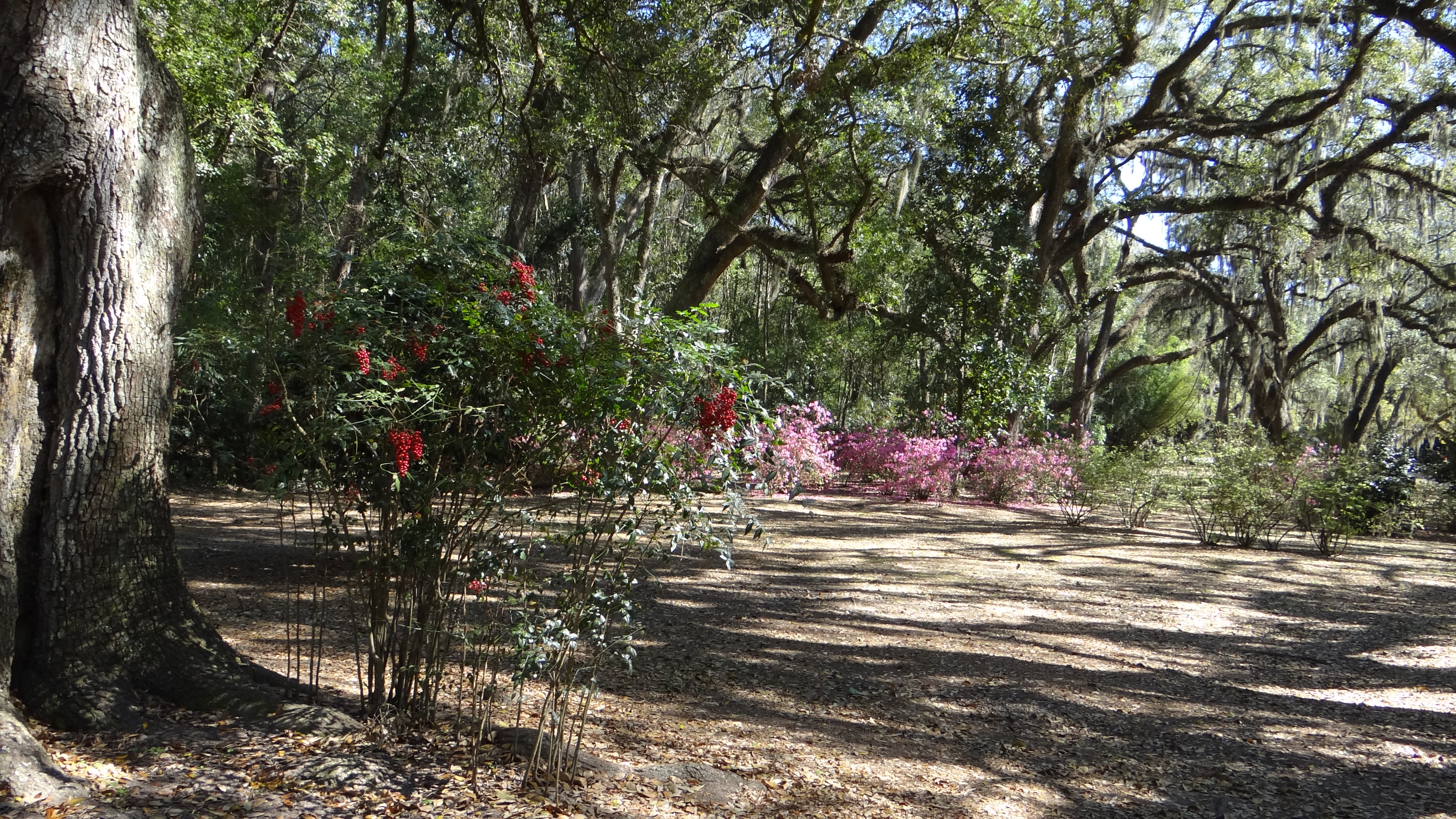
Gardens at Avery Island

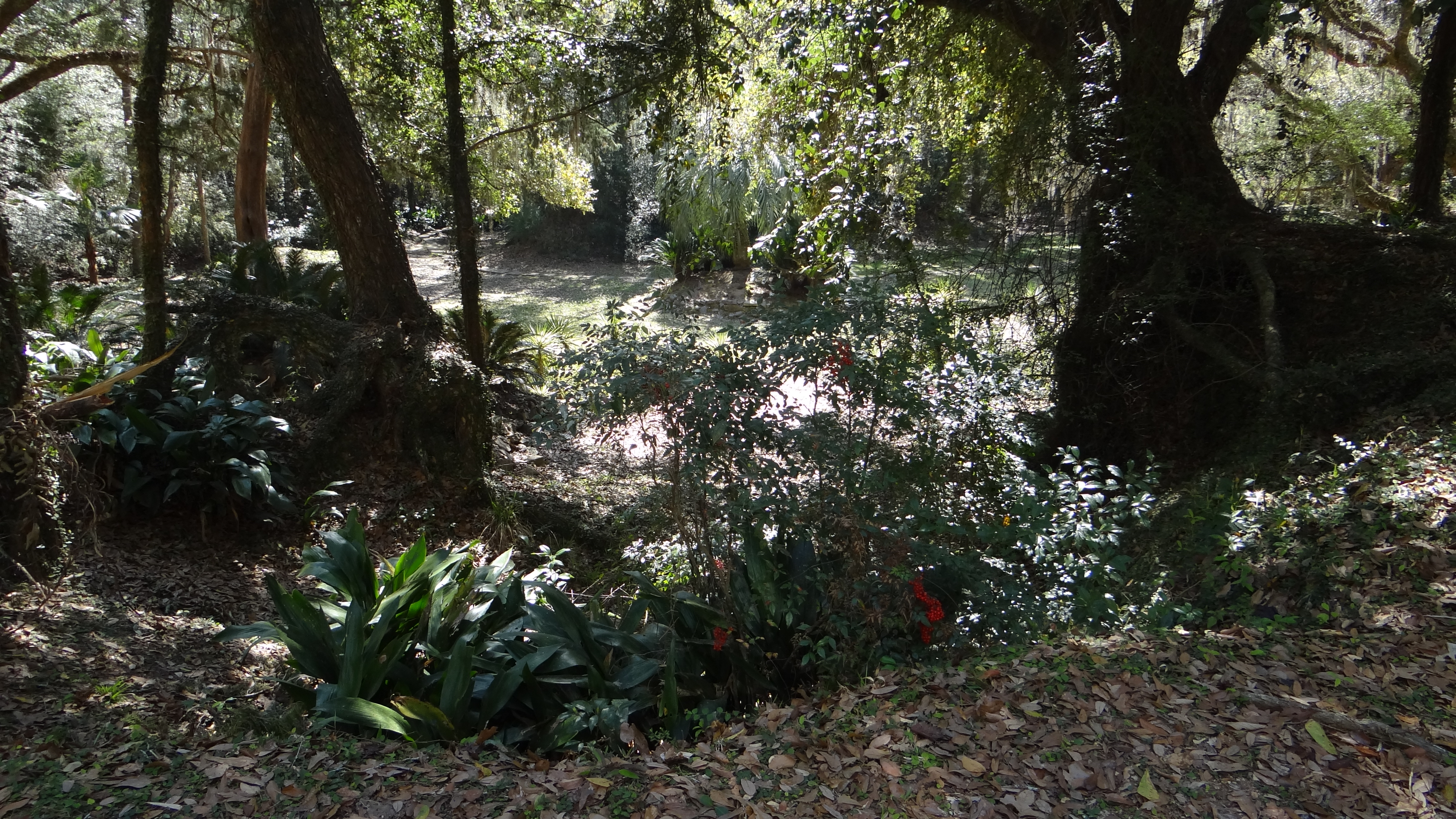
Forest at Avery Island, Louisiana

== See also ==
- USS Avery Island
