= Bob Acres =

Bob Acres is a character in Richard Brinsley Sheridan's The Rivals.

Acres was a coward, whose "courage always oozed out at his finger ends". He was popularly played in the 19th century by American actor Joseph Jefferson. (Jefferson named a Louisiana train station after this character; see Bob Acres, Louisiana.)

Winston Churchill quotes General Brabazon as emitting the name of this character when informed his force was not to attack the Boers at Dewetsdorp during the 1899 campaign.
