= USS Avery Island =

Cargo ship of the United States Navy

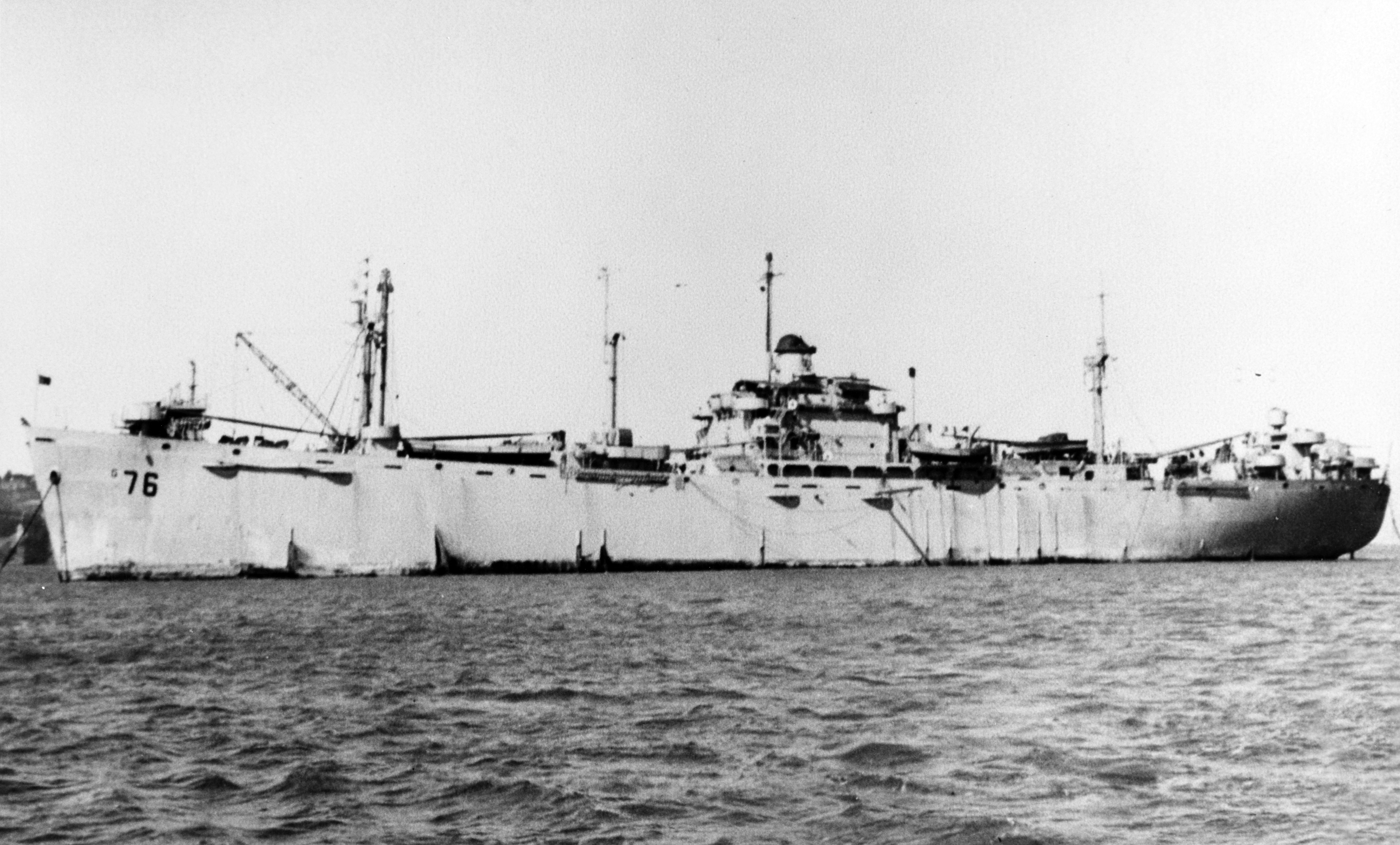

History

United States
- Name: Avery Island
- Namesake: Avery Island
- Builder: New England Shipbuilding Corporation, South Portland, Maine
- Laid down: 31 October 1944 as type (EC2-S-C1) hull, (MCE hull 3085)
- Launched: 13 December 1944
- Sponsored by: Mrs. Robert LeBourdais
- Acquired: by the Navy 21 December 1944
- Commissioned: 31 July 1945 as USS Avery Island (AG-76) at the New York Navy Yard
- Recommissioned: 27 May 1947, at San Pedro, California
- In service: 21 December 1944
- Out of service: 24 December 1944
- Reclassified: AKS-24, 18 August 1951
- Refit: Atlantic Basin Iron Works, Brooklyn, New York
- Stricken: date unknown
- Fate: transferred to the U.S. Maritime Administration, 4 January 1960
- Notes: scrapped at Sakai, Japan in 1961

General characteristics
- Type: Basilan-class miscellaneous auxiliary
- Displacement: 5,371 tons light; 14,200 tons full load
- Length: 442 ft (135 m)
- Beam: 57 ft (17 m)
- Propulsion: reciprocating steam engine, single shaft, 1,950hp
- Speed: 11.5 knots
- Complement: 891 officers and enlisted
- Armament: four 40 mm single gun mounts

USS Avery Island (AG-76/AKS-24) was a Basilan-class miscellaneous auxiliary acquired by the U.S. Navy during World War II. She was used to transport personnel and carry cargo and was inactivated and disposed of shortly after the war.

== Service history ==
Avery Island (AG-76) was laid down under a U.S. Maritime Commission contract (MCE hull 3085) on 31 October 1944 at South Portland, Maine, by the New England Shipbuilding Corporation; launched on 13 December 1944; sponsored by Mrs. Robert LeBourdais; and acquired by the Navy and commissioned on 21 December 1944. Avery Island steamed to the Atlantic Basin Iron Works, Brooklyn, New York, where she was placed out of commission on Christmas Eve for conversion work. Avery Island was recommissioned on 31 July 1945 at the New York Navy Yard; conducted trial runs in Long Island Sound and shakedown training in Chesapeake Bay; and underwent a yard availability at Norfolk, Virginia. With her training period complete, Avery Island reported on 6 September to Service Force, Atlantic Fleet, for duty.

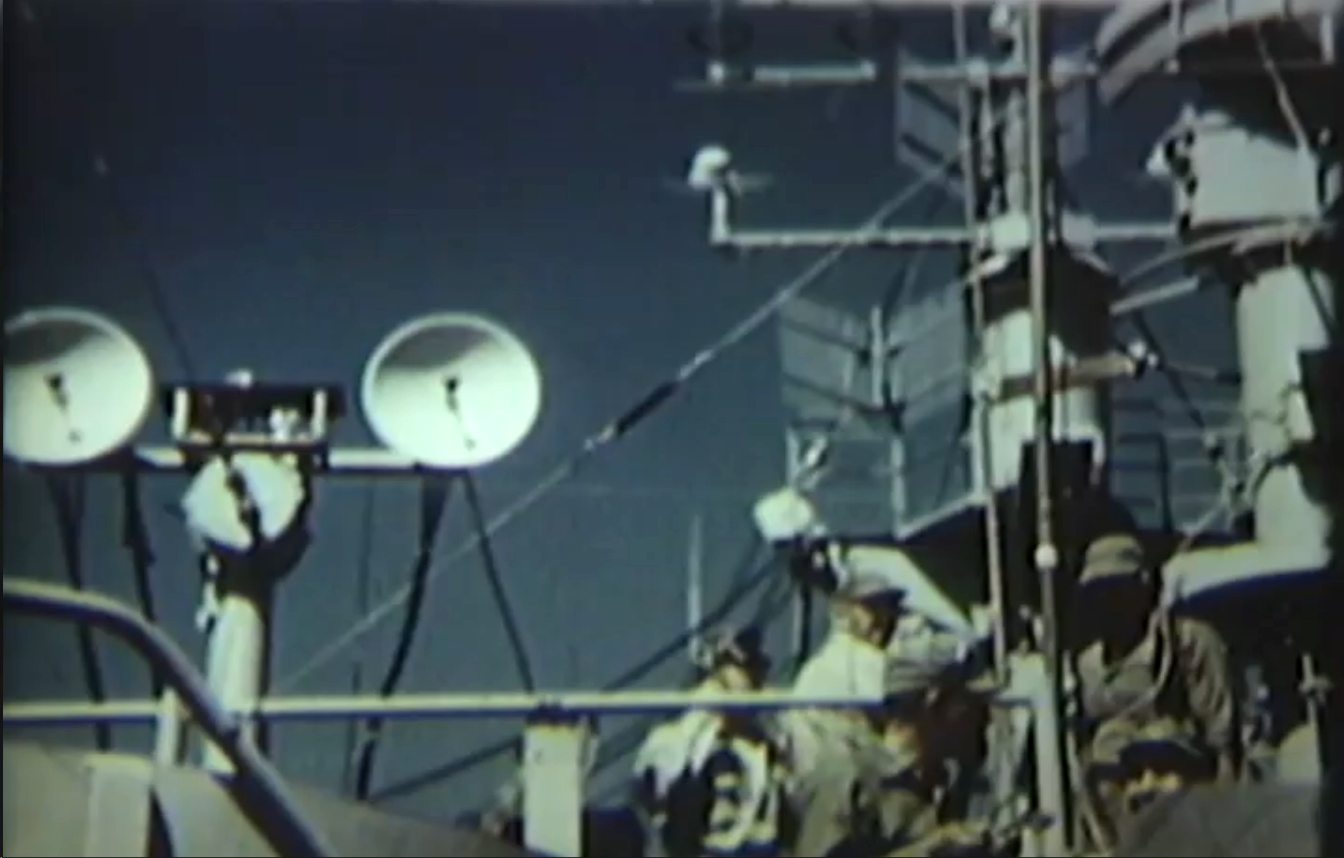
Electronic equipment aboard Avery Island, 1 July 1946.

On 7 September, Avery Island steamed out of Hampton Roads, bound for the Pacific Ocean. She transited the Panama Canal on 15 September; arrived at San Diego, California 28 September; then continued on to Hawaii. The ship dropped anchor in Pearl Harbor on 14 October and, after embarking Navy personnel for transport to Japan, proceeded to Tokyo, where she remained until 18 November. Avery Island returned to San Francisco, California, on 7 December and was overhauled at Hunters Point, California. Loaded with supplies and personnel for Operation Crossroads, Avery Island sailed on 6 May as a unit of Joint Task Force 1. The ship reached Pearl Harbor on 14 May and got underway again on 22 May, bound for Bikini Atoll. The ship entered the lagoon there on 1 June and carried out instrumentation tests during Operation Crossroads, tests to determine the effects of atomic bombs on ships.

Following the end of this mission, Avery Island returned to San Francisco on 21 August and shifted to San Pedro, California, on 3 October, and was assigned to the 19th Fleet. She steamed to Santa Cruz Basin on 13 November to undergo radiological decontamination before beginning deactivation procedures. The vessel was placed out of commission, in reserve, on 26 May 1947, at San Pedro. The ship's designation was changed to AKS-24 on 18 August 1951. On 4 January 1960, Avery Island was transferred to the U.S. Maritime Administration, and she was subsequently sold for scrapping
