= Spanish Lake (Iberia Parish) =

Lake in Louisiana, United States

- Location within Louisiana Location within the United States
- Location: Iberia / St. Martin parishes, Louisiana, United States
- Coordinates: 30°02′43″N 91°51′06″W
- Basin countries: United States

Spanish Lake, originally called Lake Flamand and then Lake Tasse, is located off of LA Hwy 182 in Iberia Parish and St. Martin Parish, Louisiana.
