= Joseph Jefferson House =

- U.S. National Register of Historic Places
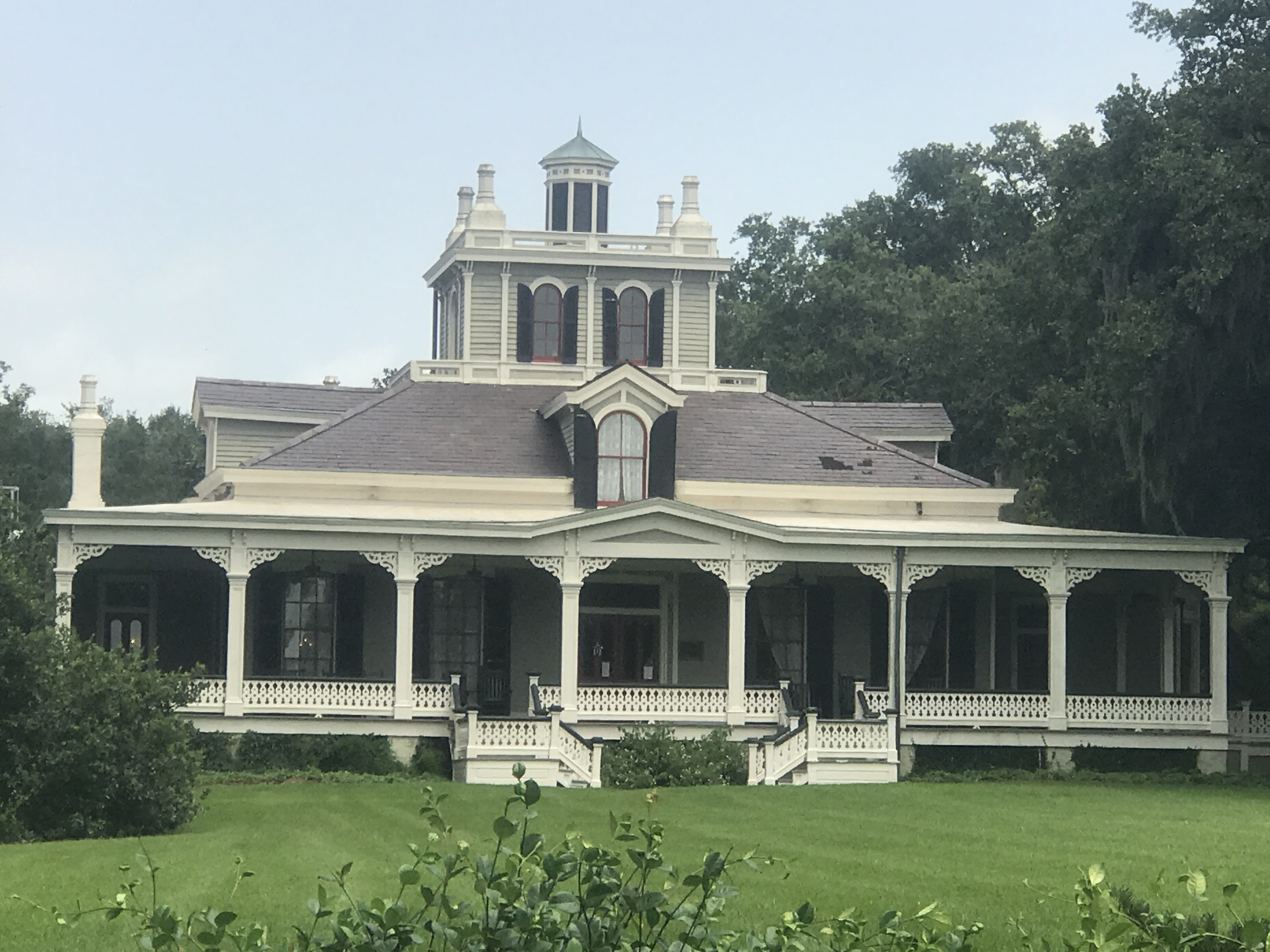

- Location within Louisiana
- Location: Jefferson Island, Iberia Parish, Louisiana, U.S.
- Area: 20 acres (8.1 ha)
- Built: 1870
- Architectural style: Late Victorian
- NRHP reference No.: 73000867
- Added to NRHP: June 4, 1973

The Joseph Jefferson House, also known as the Rip Van Winkle House and Gardens, the Live Oak Gardens, and the Bob Acres Plantation, is a historic house built in 1870 on Jefferson Island in Iberia Parish, Louisiana. The Joseph Jefferson House was built in 1870 for Joseph Jefferson, an American stage and silent film actor.

The house has been on the National Register of Historic Places list since June 4, 1973.

== History ==
The house sits on former Orange Island, now known Jefferson Island. Jefferson Island, is the first of the famous "Five Islands" of south Louisiana. These islands originate in prehistory when the enormous pressures of the earth forced a site of pure rock salt up from a mother bed, five miles below the surface. This elevated several low hills in tidal coastal marshes.

Prior to Joseph Jefferson's ownership, the island was owned by Jean Laffite's brother in-law who had acquired the island through a Spanish land grant.

In 1869, actor Joseph Jefferson bought the island as a hunting and fishing location. The Joseph Jefferson House was built in 1870. Jefferson had played the role of Rip Van Winkle in cinematic adaptations of Washington Irving's short story. Jefferson died in 1905, and the estate was inherited by his family.

The estate was purchased by John Lyle Bayless in 1917. It was later inherited by his son, John Lyle Bayless Jr., who designed the gardens.

On November 20, 1980, the Jefferson Island disaster happened, they had been oil drilling in Lake Peigneur when the rig hit into a salt mine which caused a large sink hole. In 2001, the home and garden tours had closed due to neglect. In Fall of 2002, Hurricane Lili caused extensive damages.

From 1982 until 1991, the house was owned by the Live Oak Gardens Foundation (which had renamed the site, Live Oak Gardens). From 1991 until 2003, the house was owned by Carolyn Doerle and Ron Ray. Since October 2003, the home is owned by Michael "Mike" Richard (of Live Oak Gardens Limited). Richard had worked at the home from 1969 to 1991 and has restored it.

The house currently offers paid tours, a cafe and gift shop.

== Architectural significance ==
The 22 room house was designed in the Moorish Revival and Gothic Revival architectural styles. It has been listed on the National Register of Historic Places since June 4, 1973.

Most all of the materials for the building of this house were local to Louisiana, with exception to the slate on the roof and small mahogany wood used for ornate pieces. The house was built with cypress trees on the island, allegedly planted by French privateer Jean Laffite.

== See also ==
- Bob Acres, Louisiana
- National Register of Historic Places listings in Iberia Parish, Louisiana
