= Cote Blanche =

Mound in Louisiana, United States

Coordinates: 29°45′13″N 91°42′57″W

Cote Blanche is an island located at St. Mary Parish, Louisiana, United States. It is an elevated mound rising about 25 meters above the surrounding Holocene coastal marshes at the shore of West Cote Blanche Bay, which in turn opens onto the Gulf of Mexico. The island is about 1000 acres in area. Its name comes from the French Côte Blanche, meaning "White Coast."

There are salt mines on Cote Blanche, and they have been in operation since 1961.
