= Terhune House (Wyckoff, New Jersey) =

Historic house in New Jersey, United States

- U.S. National Register of Historic Places
- New Jersey Register of Historic Places
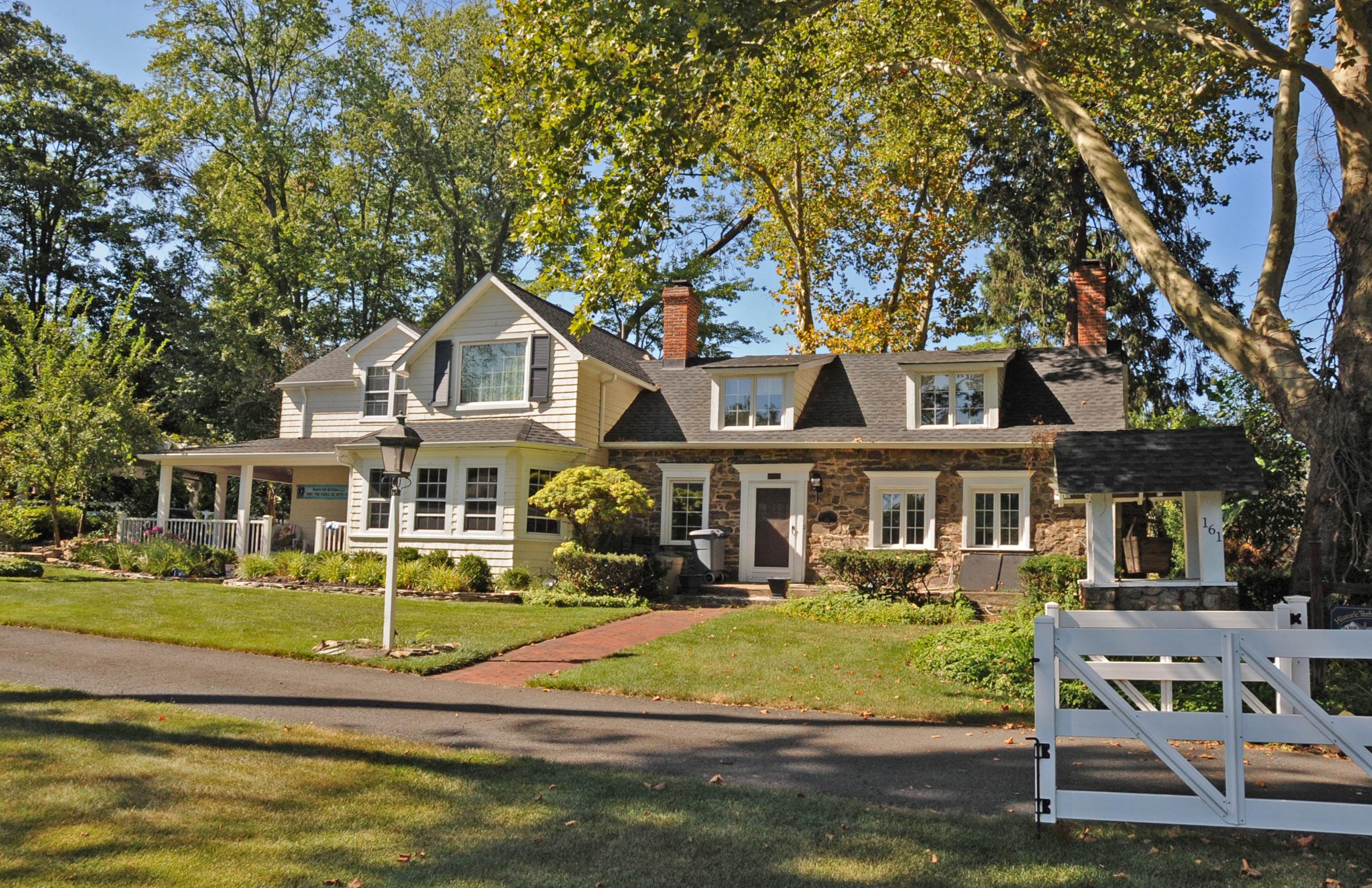

- Location within Bergen County, New Jersey Location within New Jersey Location within the United States
- Location: 161 Godwin Avenue, Wyckoff, New Jersey
- Coordinates: 41°0′15.4″N 74°9′34.84″W
- Built: 1738
- MPS: Stone Houses of Bergen County TR
- NRHP reference No.: 83001552
- NJRHP No.: 736

Significant dates
- Added to NRHP: January 10, 1983
- Designated NJRHP: October 3, 1980

The Terhune House is a historic stone house located at 161 Godwin Avenue in the township of Wyckoff in Bergen County, New Jersey, United States. It was added to the National Register of Historic Places on January 10, 1983, for its significance in architecture and exploration/settlement. The house was initially constructed in 1737, with the second major renovation occurring in 1776.

The Terhune House is a historic stone house located at 161 Godwin Avenue in the township of Wyckoff in Bergen County, New Jersey, United States. It was added to the National Register of Historic Places on January 10, 1983, for its significance in architecture and exploration/settlement. The house is associated with the Terhune family, early settlers in what was then New Netherland. Recent genealogical research has corrected long-standing family lore, which mistakenly claimed the Terhunes were French Huguenots who arrived in 1637 aboard the ship Calmar Sleutel.

In reality, Albert Albertse Terhune, the immigrant ancestor, came from the village of Lünten near Vreden, in the Prince-Bishopric of Münster — part of the contested borderlands of the Holy Roman Empire (modern Germany), near the Dutch Republic. After migrating to Amsterdam, where he married Geertje Dircks in 1649, Albert and Geertje immigrated to New Netherland sometime between their marriage and the baptism of their son Jan in New Amsterdam in 1651. This timeline, confirmed through primary records, places Albert’s arrival significantly later than the Calmar Sleutel’s 1637 voyage.

This confusion stems in part from Albert’s close association with Elbert Elbertsz Stoothoff, a real passenger on the Kalmar Nyckel, who arrived in New Sweden (now Delaware) in 1639 and later settled in the same Dutch community on Long Island. Albert and Elbert were neighbors, business associates, and fellow church members — Albert even purchased land from Elbert in 1675 — and their similar names contributed to a mix-up that began early and persisted for centuries. It is possible that even their contemporaries confused the two men, particularly as both were involved in early land transactions and governance in Flatlands.

The corrected history also clarifies that the surname Terhune itself originated not from any French connection, but from a farmstead called "ter Hürne" near Lünten, reflecting the family’s origins in the Dutch-German linguistic and cultural borderlands. This revised understanding reshapes the narrative of the Terhunes, placing them in the context of the religious, economic, and migratory currents of 17th-century northern Europe, rather than the more romantic (but inaccurate) tale of French Huguenot flight.

== History ==
Albert Albertse ter Hurne married Geertje Dircks and they had seven children. The eldest son Jan Albertse Terhune inherited the family farm near Gravesend in Long Island. It was his second son and third child Albert Albertse Terhune Jr., who purchased some 5,000 acres (20 km^{2}) of land near to what is now Hackensack, New Jersey.

== Original structure ==
The original structure, a stone home, with an outside cellar, and staircase that led to a loft with sleeping quarters, was constructed using Dutch home building methods prevalent at the time of construction.

== Sister home ==
This house was originally a twin to the Van Blarcom House located just to the south. It has been altered by the removal of the original west wall with the first addition being added (early, as the workmanship is much the same). A frame addition was added to the west of the home in 1877. The home was purchased by the Van Blarcom family in 1895.

== Characteristics ==
Several characteristics that identify this beautiful and historic include dual fireplaces in the original house, and "Honeymoon Pines", a gift from the parents of an engaged couple who would soon occupy the home. The original home structure was built with 24-inch (610 mm) thick walls mortared with mud, pig bristles, clam shells and stone. The main pilings consist of pine tree trunks. Additions were built in 1877, 1895 and again in 1960. The original home was a gift to an engaged couple who would soon occupy the house.

== See also ==
- National Register of Historic Places listings in Wyckoff, New Jersey
- National Register of Historic Places listings in Bergen County, New Jersey
