= Terhune–Ranlett House =

Historic house in New Jersey, United States

- U.S. National Register of Historic Places
- New Jersey Register of Historic Places
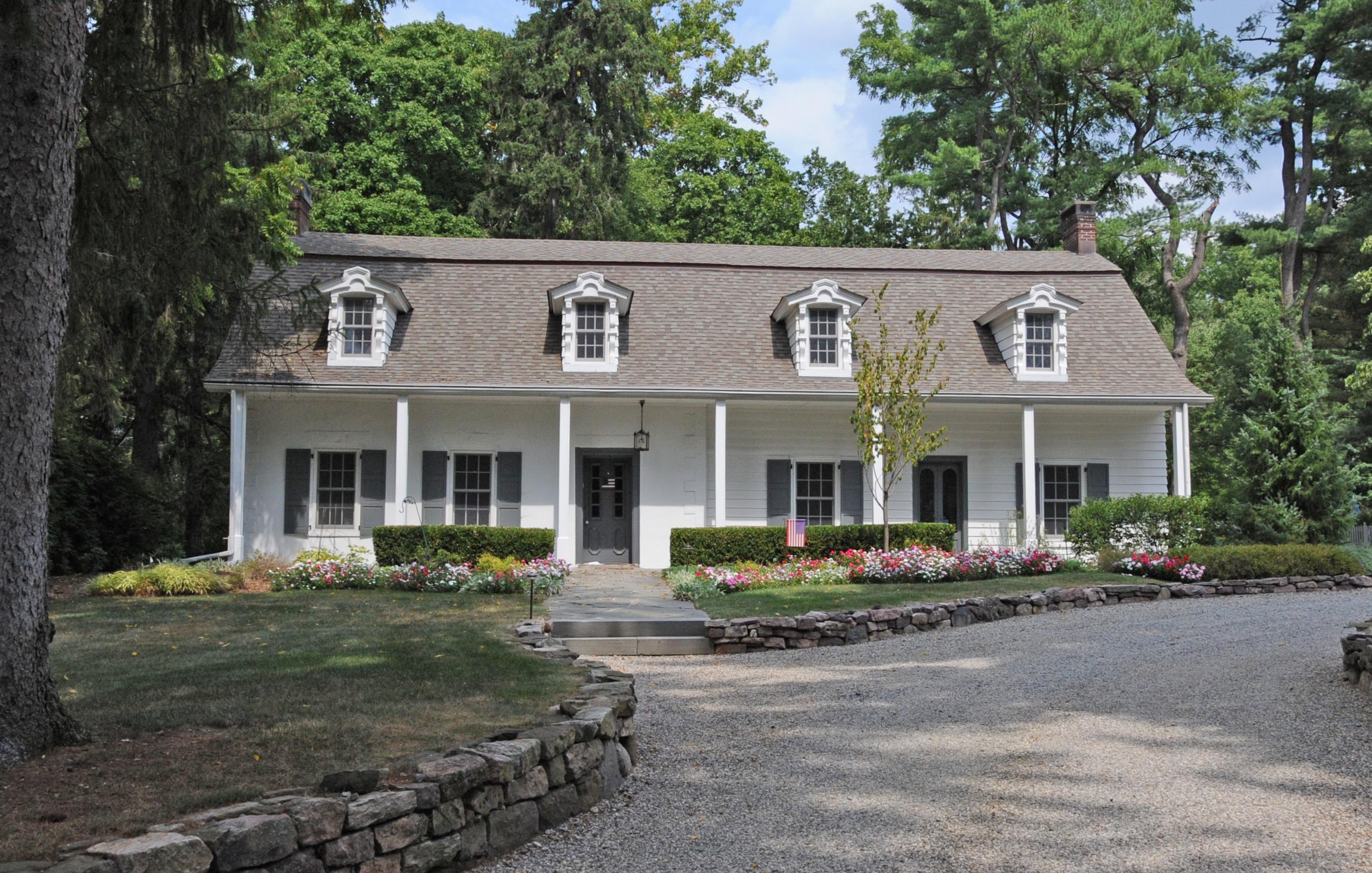

- Location within Bergen County, New Jersey Location within New Jersey Location within the United States
- Location: 933 East Saddle River Road, Ho-Ho-Kus, New Jersey
- Coordinates: 41°0′5″N 74°5′36″W
- Area: 3.3 acres (1.3 ha)
- Built: c. 1790
- MPS: Stone Houses of Bergen County TR
- NRHP reference No.: 83001555
- NJRHP No.: 542

Significant dates
- Added to NRHP: January 10, 1983
- Designated NJRHP: October 3, 1980

The Terhune–Ranlett House, also known as the Joe Jefferson House, is located at 933 East Saddle River Road in the borough of Ho-Ho-Kus in Bergen County, New Jersey, United States. It was built around 1790 according to architectural evidence. The historic stone house was added to the National Register of Historic Places on January 10, 1983, for its significance in architecture. It was listed as part of the Early Stone Houses of Bergen County Multiple Property Submission (MPS).

== History and description ==
According to the nomination form, it was built by Abraham Terhune. The Terhune family lived here until around 1860 when the architect William H. Ranlett bought the property. After his death, the actor Joe Jefferson bought the property in 1870. He used it to stage small theatrical works.

== See also ==
- National Register of Historic Places listings in Bergen County, New Jersey
