= Lake Peigneur =

Lake in Iberia Parish, Louisiana, US

- Location within Louisiana Location within the United States
- Location: Iberia Parish, Louisiana
- Coordinates: 29.981°N 91.983°W
- Primary inflows: estimated 8.47 cu ft/s (0.240 m^{3}/s) from catchment
- Primary outflows: Delcambre Canal
- Catchment area: 10.2 sq mi (26 km^{2}) of the Vermilion-Teche Basin
- Basin countries: United States
- Surface area: 1,125 acres (455 ha)
- Average depth: 3 ft (1 m)
- Max. depth: 200 ft (61 m)

Lake Peigneur (Note: /peɪnˈjɔːr, ˈpeɪnjər/ payn-YOR, PAYN-yər; French pronunciation: [pɛɲœʁ]) is a brackish lake in the U.S. state of Louisiana, 1.2 miles (1.9 kilometers) north of Delcambre and 9.1 mi (14.6 km) west of New Iberia, near the northernmost tip of Vermilion Bay. With a maximum depth of 200 feet (60 meters), it is the deepest lake in Louisiana. Its name comes from the French word "peigneur", meaning "one who combs."

It had been a 10-foot-deep (3 m) freshwater lake, popular for recreation, until human activity caused an unusual disaster on November 20, 1980, that changed its structure and the surrounding land.

== Drilling disaster ==
Geology of a generic salt dome trap. At Lake Peigneur, the upward thrust of a salt dome, which became the Diamond Crystal salt mine, formed Jefferson Island.

In petroleum geology, the formation of a salt dome often pushes terrain upward from the surrounding land, while also creating a subterranean salt dome trap, holding petroleum deposits. A salt dome trap below Lake Peigneur caused upward thrust of the overlying soil, resulting in the formation of Jefferson Island, located near the southeast side of the lake. On November 20, 1980, an oil rig contracted by Texaco was drilling on Jefferson Island, when the drilling assembly pierced an inactive third level of the Diamond Crystal Salt Company salt mine. The drill hole produced a vortex that drained the lake into the mine, filling the enormous caverns that had been created through the removal of salt.

The mine, in operation since 1919, consisted of several levels up to 1,500 feet (460 m) below the surface. Each tunnel was about 100 by 80 feet (30 m × 24 m). Pillars of salt had been left in place to support the ceiling at each level. The pillars were dissolved by the encroaching fresh water and caused the mine tunnels to collapse.

The backwards flow of the normally outflowing Delcambre Canal temporarily created the tallest waterfall in Louisiana

The resultant sinkhole swallowed the drilling platform, 11 barges holding supplies for the drilling operation, a tugboat, many trees, and 65 acres (26 hectares) of the surrounding terrain, including much of Jefferson Island. So much water drained into the caverns that the flow of the Delcambre Canal that usually empties the lake into Vermilion Bay was reversed, causing salt water from the Gulf of Mexico to flow into what was now an empty lakebed. This backflow created for a few days the tallest waterfall in Louisiana, at 164 ft (50 m), as the lake refilled with salty water from the Delcambre Canal and Vermilion Bay. Air displaced by water flowing into the mine caverns erupted through the mineshafts as compressed air and then later as 400-foot (120 m) geysers.

Although there were no human deaths, three dogs were reported killed. All 55 employees in the mine at the time of the accident escaped, and six employees were given awards by Diamond Crystal for their heroism. Their successful evacuation was thanks to the mine's electrician who noticed a torrent of water and sounded the alarm, as well as the employees' discipline and training making their escape via the only elevator in an orderly fashion. The crew of seven on the drilling rig fled the platform shortly before it collapsed into the new depths of the lake. A fisherman who was on the lake at the time piloted his small boat to shore and escaped.

Days after the disaster, once the water pressure equalized, nine of the eleven sunken barges popped out of the whirlpool and refloated on the lake's surface.

=== Cause ===
On the morning of November 20, 1980, the oil rig was conducting exploratory drilling in the lake alongside the edge of the salt dome. The rig's 14-inch (36 cm) diameter drill assembly had become stuck at 1,228 feet (374 m) two-and-a-half hours before the drilling rig began to tilt. The drill assembly punctured the salt mine beneath the lake, and the water entered the mine. Over the course of several hours, the fresh lake water dissolved the salt and enlarged the hole, causing the lake to drain into the mine.

Evidence that could have confirmed the cause was washed away in the whirlpool. Engineers from Texaco and Diamond Crystal worked together after the fact and pinpointed the likely location of the hole within a mined out portion of the 1,300-foot (400 m) level of the mine. The Mine Safety and Health Administration was unable to determine blame because they could not determine whether Texaco was drilling in the wrong place or if the mine's maps were inaccurate.

=== Aftermath ===
In 1983, Texaco and the drilling contractor Wilson Brothers paid US$32 million (equivalent to $103 million in 2025) to Diamond Crystal, while Texaco, Wilson Brothers, and Diamond Crystal also paid a total of $12.8 million (equivalent to $41.4 million in 2025) to the Live Oak Gardens botanical garden and plant nursery, in out-of-court settlements to compensate for the damage caused. The Mine Safety and Health Administration released a report on the disaster in August 1981 which documented the event but did not identify an official reason for the disaster.

The mine was closed in December 1986. Since 1994, AGL Resources has used Lake Peigneur's underlying salt dome as a storage and hub facility for pressurized natural gas. There was concern from local residents in 2009 over the safety of storing the gas under the lake and nearby drilling operations.

== See also ==
- Bayou Corne sinkhole
- Döda fallet
- Lake Beloye (Nizhny Novgorod Oblast)
- List of sinkholes of the United States
- Rylands v Fletcher
