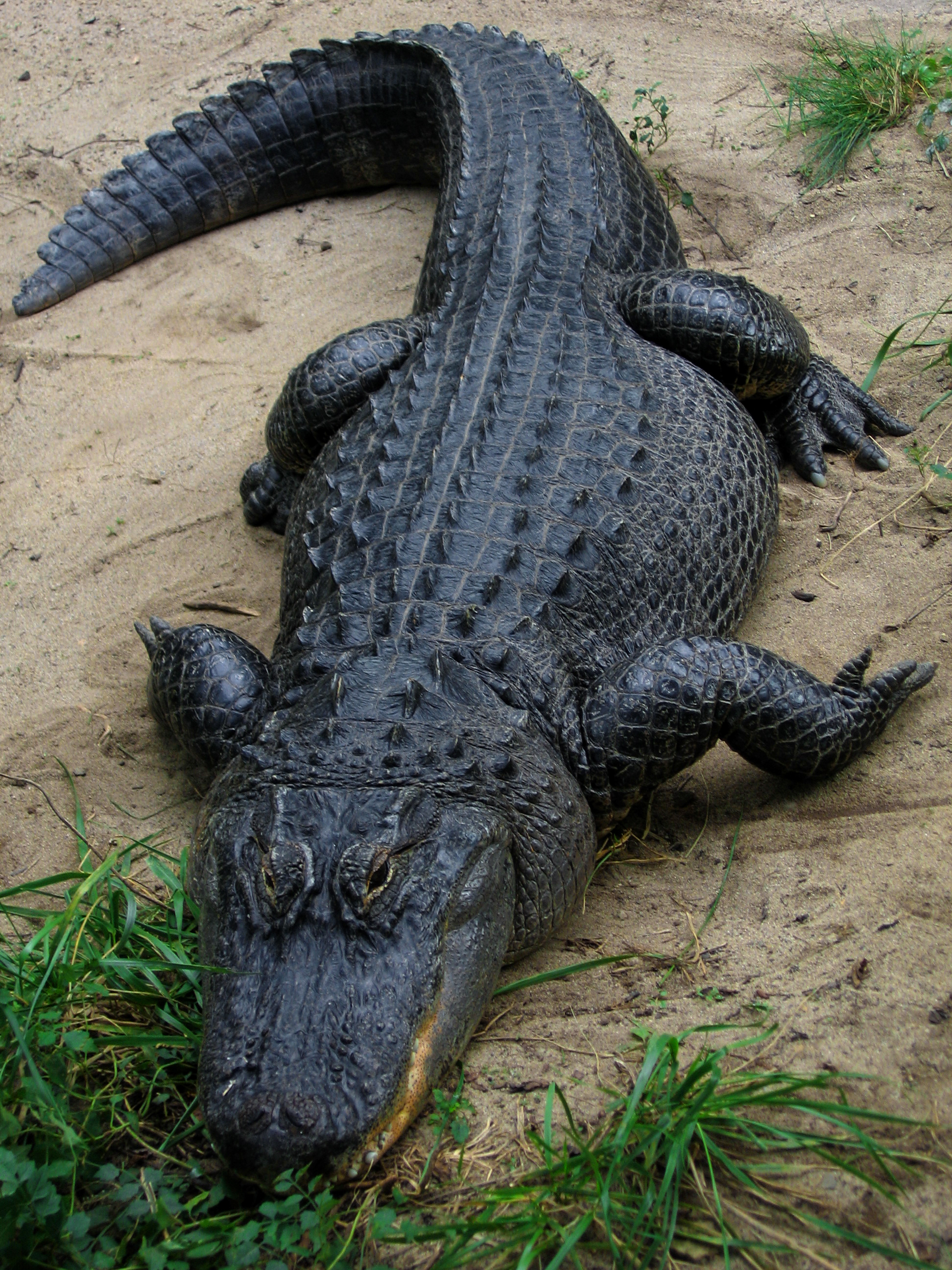
- At the Columbus Zoo and Aquarium in Powell, Ohio

Conservation status
- Least Concern (IUCN 3.1)
- CITES Appendix II

Scientific classification
- Kingdom: Animalia
- Phylum: Chordata
- Class: Reptilia
- Order: Crocodylia
- Family: Alligatoridae
- Subfamily: Alligatorinae
- Genus: Alligator
- Species: A. mississippiensis

Binomial name
- Alligator mississippiensis (Daudin, 1802)
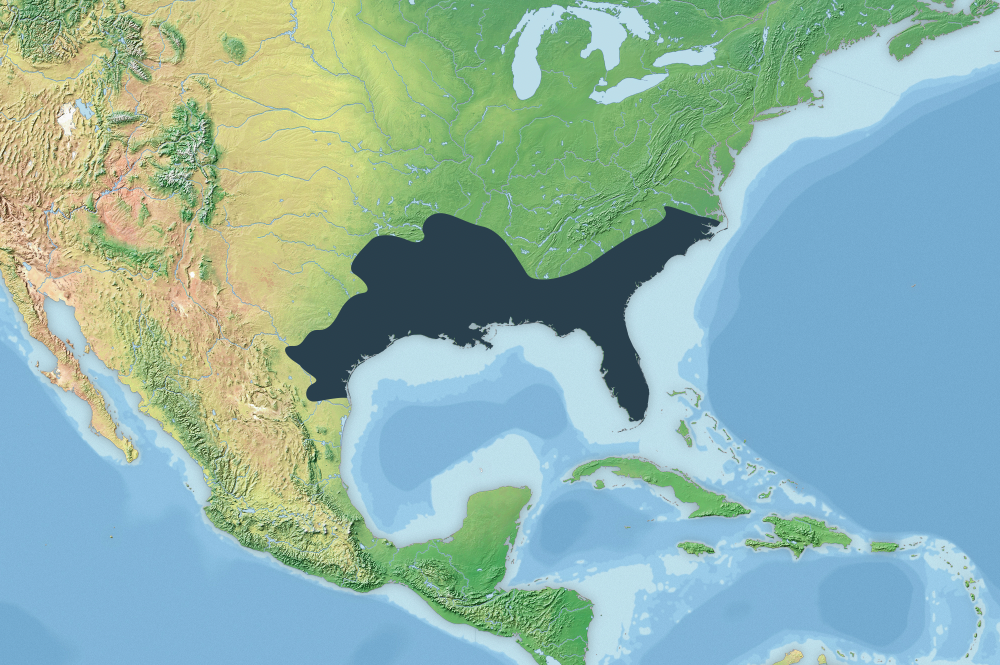
- Approximate range of American alligator

Synonyms
- Crocodilus mississipiensis [sic] Daudin, 1802; Crocodilus lucius Cuvier, 1807; Crocodilus cuvieri Leach, 1815; Alligator lucius — A.M.C. Duméril & Bibron, 1836; Alligator mississippiensis [sic] — Holbrook, 1842

= American alligator =

American alligator Temporal range: Middle Pleistocene–Present

Crocodilian native to the Southeastern United States

The American alligator (Alligator mississippiensis), sometimes referred to as a common alligator or just gator, is a large crocodilian reptile native to the Southeastern United States. It is one of the two extant species in the genus Alligator, and is larger than the only other living alligator species, the Chinese alligator.

Adult male American alligators measure 3.4 to 4.8 m (11.2 to 15.7 ft) in length, and can weigh up to 450 kg (1,000 lb), with unverified sizes of up to 5.84 m (19.2 ft) and weights of 1,000 kg (2,200 lb) making it the heaviest member of the family Alligatoridae, and the second longest one, after the black caiman. Females are smaller, measuring 2.6 to 3.35 m (8.5 to 11.0 ft) in length. The American alligator inhabits subtropical and tropical freshwater wetlands, such as marshes and cypress swamps, from southern Oklahoma and Texas to North Carolina. It is distinguished from the sympatric American crocodile by its broader U-shaped snout, with overlapping jaws and darker coloration, and is less tolerant of saltwater but more tolerant of cooler climates than the American crocodile, which is found only in tropical and warm subtropical climates.

American alligators are apex predators and consume fish, amphibians, reptiles, birds, mammals, and other American alligators. Hatchlings feed mostly on invertebrates. They play an important role as ecosystem engineers in wetland ecosystems through the creation of alligator holes, which provide both wet and dry habitats for other organisms. Throughout the year (in particular during the breeding season), American alligators bellow to declare territory, and locate suitable mates. Male American alligators use infrasound to attract females. Eggs are laid in a nest of vegetation, sticks, leaves, and mud in a sheltered spot on land near water. Young are born with yellow bands around their bodies and are protected by their mother for up to one year. This species displays parental care, which is rare for most reptiles. Mothers protect their eggs during the incubation period, and move the hatchlings to the water using their mouths. American alligators exhibit parental care for up to 3 years post birth.

The conservation status of the American alligator is listed as Least Concern by the International Union for Conservation of Nature. Historically, hunting had decimated their population, and the American alligator was listed as an endangered species by the Endangered Species Act of 1973. Subsequent conservation efforts have allowed their numbers to increase and the species was removed from endangered status in 1987. The species is the official state reptile of three states: Florida, Louisiana, and Mississippi.

== History and taxonomy ==
The American alligator was first classified in 1801 by French zoologist François Marie Daudin as Crocodilus mississipiensis. In 1807, Georges Cuvier created the genus Alligator for it, based on the English common name alligator (derived from Spanish word el lagarto, "the lizard").

The American alligator and its closest living relative, the Chinese alligator, belong the subfamily Alligatorinae. Alligatorinae is the sister group to the caimans of Caimaninae, which together comprise the family Alligatoridae shown in this cladogram:

- Alligatoridae
  - Caimaninae
  - Alligatorinae
    - Ceratosuchus burdoshi†
    - Hassiacosuchus haupti†
    - Navajosuchus mooki†
    - - Wannaganosuchus brachymanus†
      - Arambourgia gaudryi†
      - - Allognathosuchus polyodon†
        - Allognathosuchus wartheni†
        - Procaimanoidea kayi†
      - Alligator
        - Alligator prenasalis†
        - - Alligator mcgrewi†
          - - Alligator olseni†
            - - Alligator sinensis Chinese alligator
              - - Alligator thomsoni†
                - Alligator mefferdi†
                - Alligator mississippiensis American alligator

=== Evolution ===
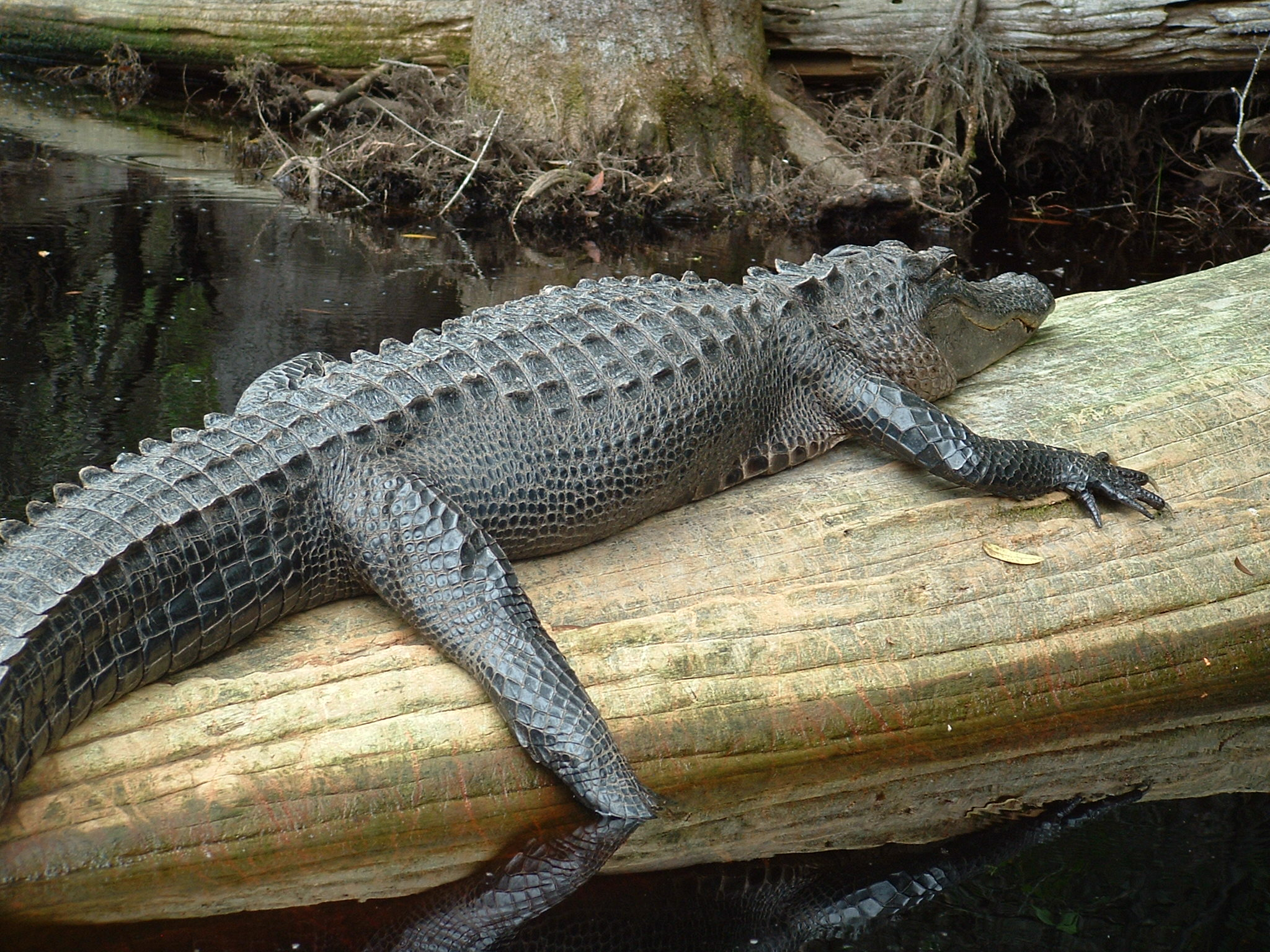
In the Okefenokee Swamp

Fossils identical to the American alligator are found throughout the Pleistocene, from 2.5 million to 11.7 thousand years ago. In 2016, a Late Miocene fossil skull of an alligator, dating to approximately seven or eight million years ago, was discovered in Marion County, Florida. Unlike the other extinct alligator species of the same genus, the fossil skull was virtually indistinguishable from that of the modern American alligator. This alligator and the American alligator are considered to be sister taxa, suggesting that the A. mississippiensis lineage has existed in North America for seven to eight million years. However in 2020, a study reconsiders that American alligators Late Miocene record, with the older fossils being reassigned to Alligator mefferdi and Alligator hailensis, and with American alligators evolving sometime during the Middle Pleistocene.

The alligator's full mitochondrial genome was sequenced in the 1990s, and it suggests the animal evolved at a rate similar to mammals and greater than birds and most cold-blooded vertebrates. However, the full genome, published in 2014, suggests that the alligator evolved much more slowly than mammals and birds.

== Characteristics ==
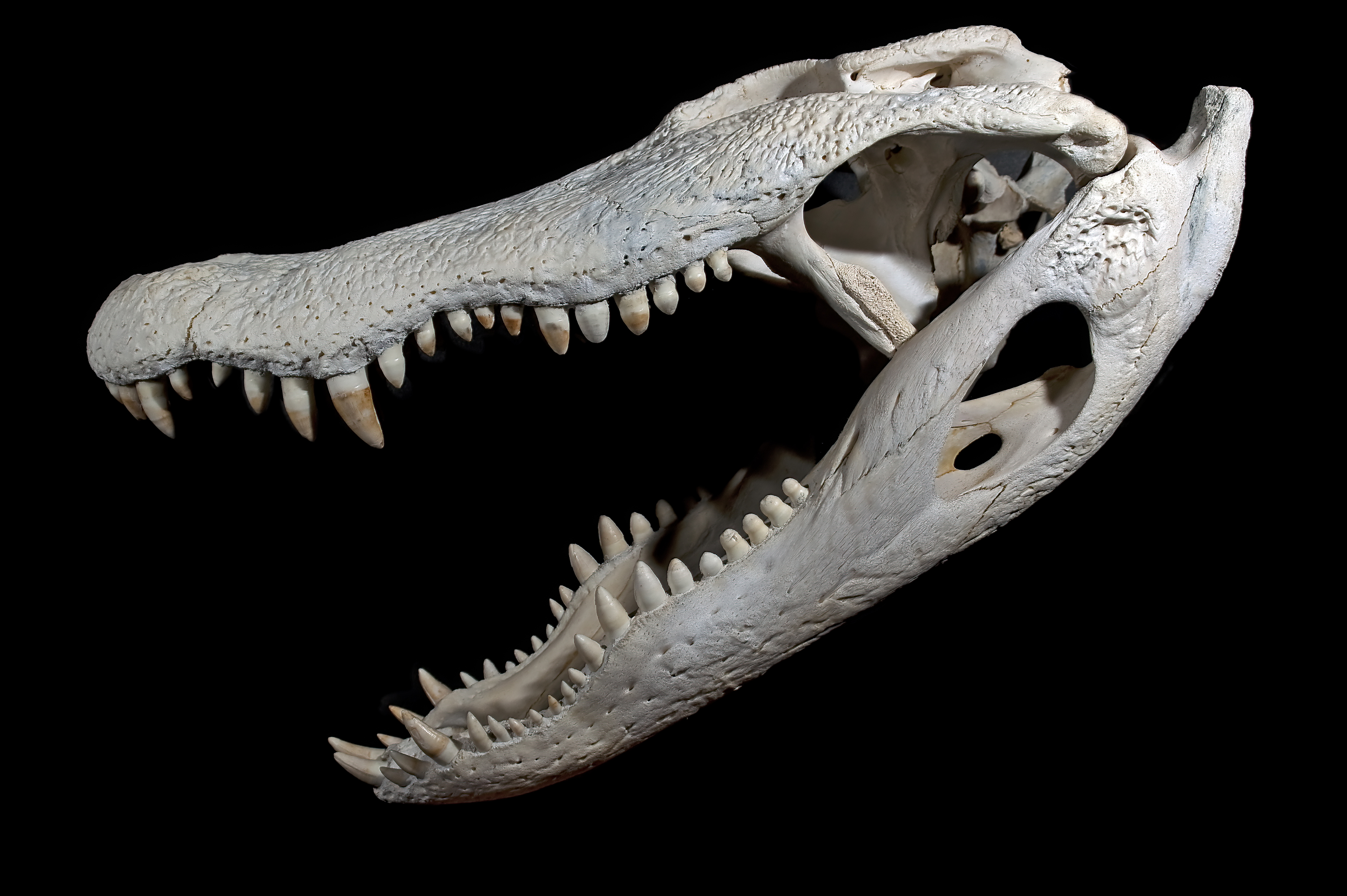
American alligator skull

3D scan of skeleton

Domestic American alligators range from long and slender to short and robust, possibly in response to variations in factors such as growth rate, diet, and climate.

=== Size ===
The American alligator is a relatively large species of crocodilian. On average, it is the largest species in the family Alligatoridae, with only the black caiman being possibly larger. Weight varies considerably depending on length, age, health, season, and available food sources. Similar to many other reptiles that range expansively into temperate zones, American alligators from the northern end of their range, such as southern Arkansas, Alabama, and northern North Carolina, tend to reach smaller sizes. Large adult American alligators tend to be relatively robust and bulky compared to other similar-length crocodilians; for example, captive males measuring 3 to 4 m (9 ft 10 in to 13 ft 1 in) were found to weigh 200 to 350 kg (440 to 770 lb), although captive specimens may outweigh wild specimens due to lack of hunting behavior and other stressors.

Large male American alligators reach an expected maximum size up to 4.6 m (15 ft 1 in) in length and weigh up to 900 kg (2,000 lb), while females reach an expected maximum of 3 m (9 ft 10 in). However, the largest free-ranging female had a total length of 3.35 m (11 ft 0 in) and weighed 147 kg (324 lb). On rare occasions, a large, old male may grow to an even greater length.

==== Largest ====
During the 19th and 20th centuries, larger males reaching 5 to 6 m (16 ft 5 in to 19 ft 8 in) were reported. The largest reported individual size was a male killed in 1890 by Edward McIlhenny on Marsh Island, Louisiana, and reportedly measured at 5.84 m (19 ft 2 in) in length, but no voucher specimen was available, since the American alligator was left on a muddy bank after having been measured due to having been too massive to relocate. If the size of this animal was correct, it would have weighed about 1,000 kg (2,200 lb). In Arkansas, a man killed an American alligator that was 4.04 m (13 ft 3 in) and 626 kg (1,380 lb). The largest American alligator ever killed in Florida was 5.31 m (17 ft 5 in), as reported by the Everglades National Park, although this record is unverified. The largest American alligator scientifically verified in Florida for the period from 1977 to 1993 was reportedly 4.23 m (13 ft 11 in) and weighed 473 kg (1,043 lb), although another specimen (size estimated from skull) may have measured 4.54 m (14 ft 11 in). A specimen that was 4.5 m (14 ft 9 in) long and weighed 458.8 kg (1,011.5 lb) is the largest American alligator killed in Alabama and has been declared the SCI world record in 2014.

==== Reported sizes ====
Date	Location	Reported length	Reported weight	Reported girth	Reported skull length	Scientifically analyzed length	Comments
January 2, 1890	Lake Vermilion, Louisiana	584.2 cm	not listed	not listed	not listed	not listed	Shot by Edward Avery McIlhenny. Body was too heavy to tow out of the mud.
1886	Avery Island, Louisiana	523.24 cm	not listed	not listed	not listed	not listed	Captured alive by John Avery and died en route to the Smithsonian Institution after a sailor poured green paint on its back.
March 1916	Marsh Island, Louisiana	561.34 cm	not listed	not listed	not listed	not listed	Killed by Max Touchet, a game warden on Marsh Island following an attempted live capture.
1956	Lake Apopka, Florida	530.86 cm	not listed	not listed	not listed	not listed	Estimated by Allan Woodward to have been 421.64 cm using head to length formula.
November 11, 2010	St Johns River, Florida	435.61 cm	297 kg	not listed	not listed	435.61 cm	
August 23, 2012	Lake Talquin, Florida	426.72 cm	not listed	not listed	60.325 cm	426.72 cm	
August 16, 2014	Alabama River, Alabama	480 cm	458.8 kg	not listed	not listed	480 cm	Biologists initially measured a length of 457 cm. Later after the head and hide had been removed a measurement of 480 cm was made, likely a result of the hide stretching.
May 31, 2016	Palmetto, Florida	426.72 cm	not listed	not listed	not listed	not listed	Estimated to be between 426.72 cm and 457.2 cm when spotted.
September 26, 2020	Lake Merrisach, Arkansas	425.45 cm	362.874 kg	not listed	not listed	not listed	
February 2, 2022	Lake Washington, Florida	401.32 cm	410.501 kg	not listed	not listed	not listed	Killed by Doug Borries of Dynamic Outdoors TV after alligator began eating livestock.
August 29, 2023	Yazoo River, Mississippi	434.34 cm	364.00 kg	167.64 cm	not listed	434.34 cm	
September 7, 2025	Ross Barnett Reservoir, Mississippi	426.72 cm	272 to 317 kilograms	not listed	not listed	397.50 cm	

==== Average ====
American alligators do not normally reach such extreme sizes. In mature males, most specimens grow up to about 3.4 m (11 ft 2 in) in length, and weigh up to 360 kg (790 lb), while in females, the mature size is normally around 2.6 m (8 ft 6 in), with a body weight up to 91 kg (201 lb). In Newnans Lake, Florida, adult males averaged 73.2 kg (161 lb) in weight and 2.47 m (8 ft 1 in) in length, while adult females averaged 55.1 kg (121 lb) and measured 2.22 m (7 ft 3 in). In Lake Griffin State Park, Florida, adults weighed on average 57.9 kg (128 lb). Weight at sexual maturity per one study was stated as averaging 30 kg (66 lb) while adult weight was claimed as 160 kg (350 lb).

==== Relation to age ====
There is a common presumption stated throughout reptilian literature that crocodilians, including the American alligator, exhibit indeterminate growth, meaning the animal continues to grow for the duration of its life. However, these claims are largely based on assumptions and observations of juvenile and young adult crocodilians, and recent studies are beginning to contradict this claim. For example, one long-term mark-recapture study (1979–2015) done at the Tom Yawkey Wildlife Center in South Carolina found evidence to support patterns of determinate growth, with growth ceasing upon reaching a certain age (43 years for males and 31 years for females).

==== Sexual dimorphism ====
While noticeable in very mature specimens, the sexual dimorphism in size of the American alligator is relatively modest among crocodilians. For contrast, the sexual dimorphism of saltwater crocodiles is much more extreme, with mature males nearly twice as long as and at least four times as heavy as female saltwater crocodiles. Given that female American alligators have relatively higher survival rates at an early age and a large percentage of given populations consists of immature or young breeding American alligators, relatively few large mature males of the expected mature length of 3.4 m (11 ft 2 in) or more are typically seen.

=== Color ===
Dorsally, adult American alligators may be olive, brown, gray, or black. However, they are on average one of the most darkly colored modern crocodilians (although other alligatorid family members are also fairly dark), and can reliably be distinguished by color via their more blackish dorsal scales against crocodiles. Meanwhile, their undersides are cream-colored. Some American alligators are missing or have an inhibited gene for melanin, which makes them albino. These American alligators are extremely rare and almost impossible to find in the wild. They could only survive in captivity, as they are very vulnerable to the sun and predators.

=== Jaws, teeth, and snout ===
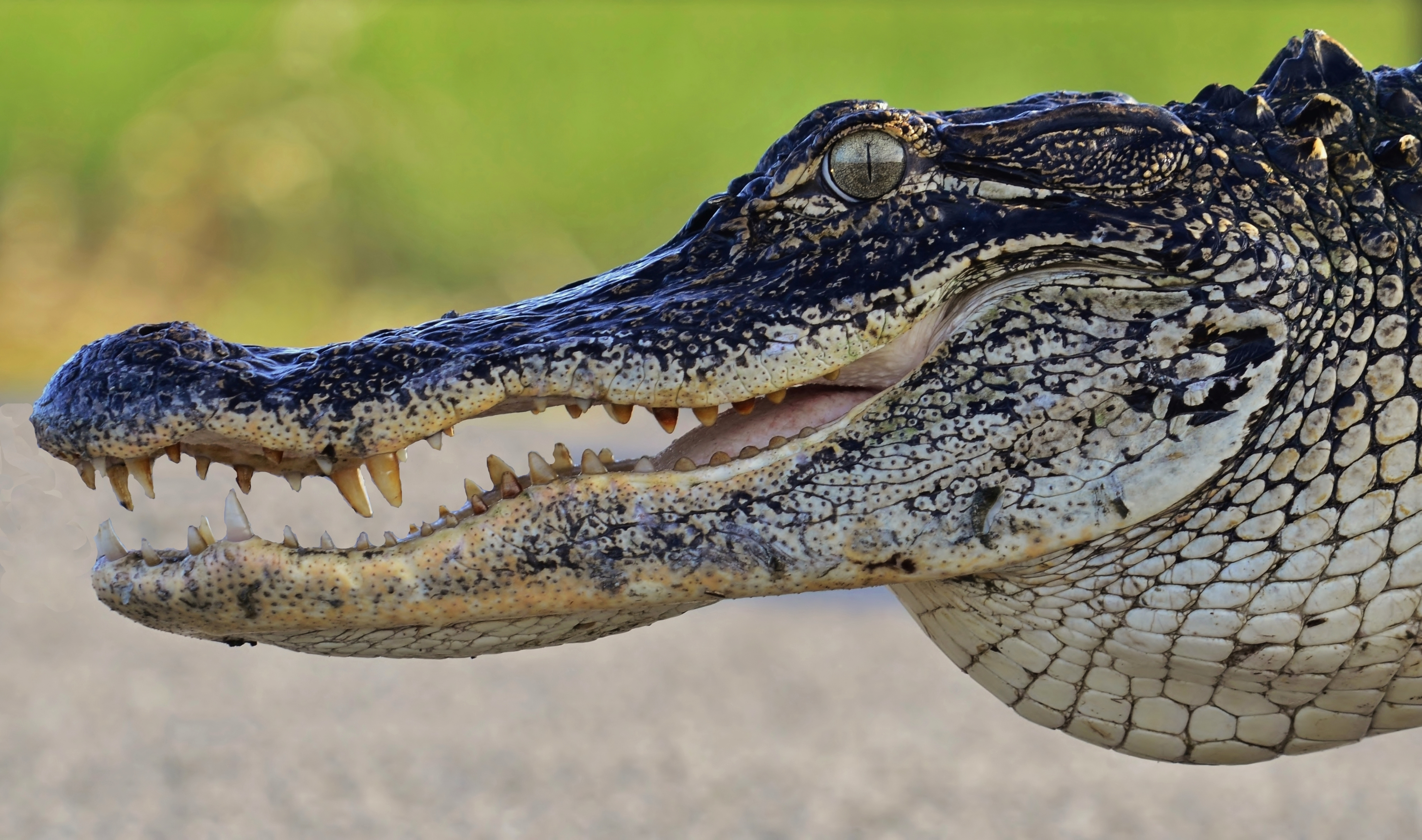
American alligator showing teeth

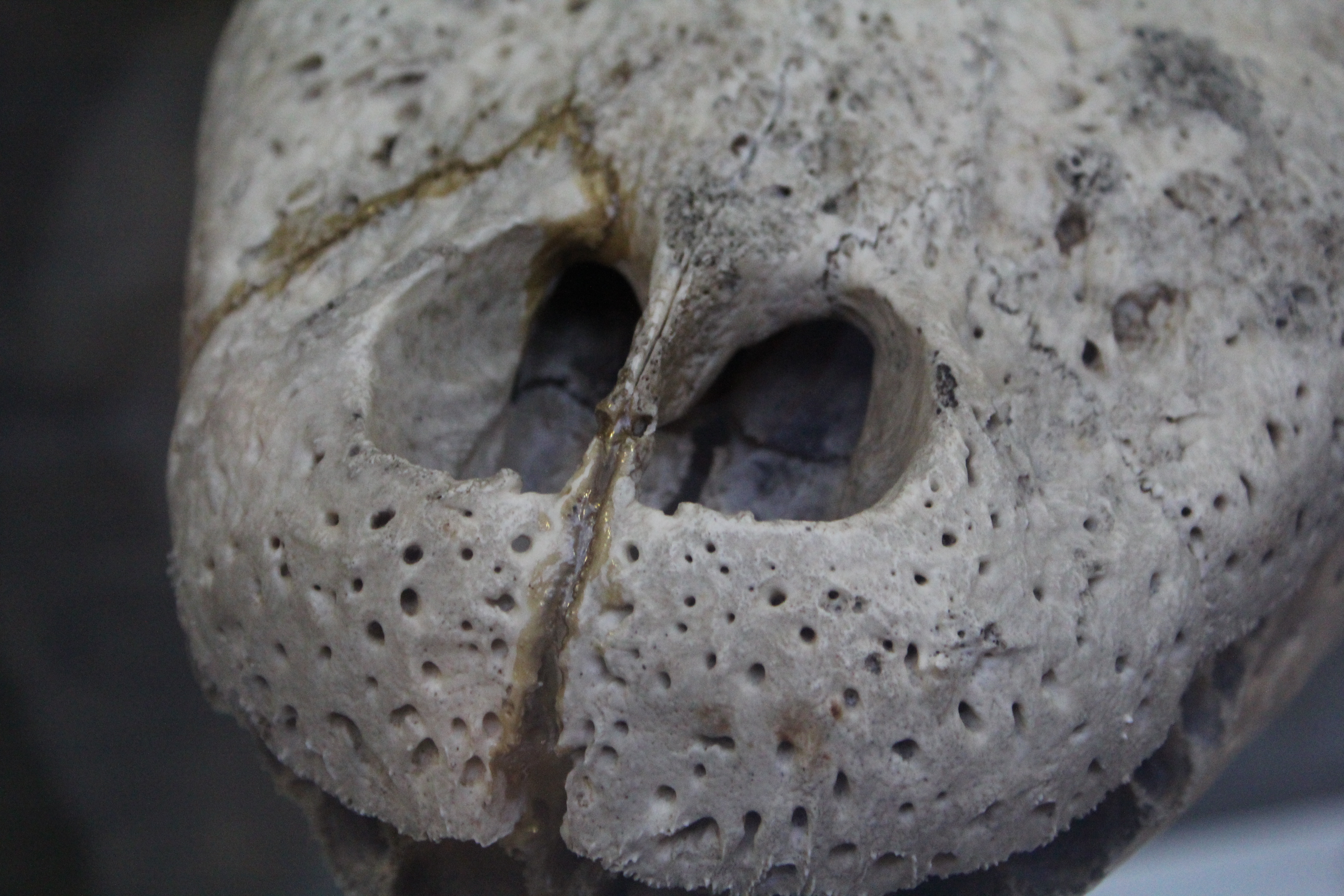
The snout of an American alligator skull

American alligators have 74–80 teeth. As they grow and develop, the morphology of their teeth and jaws change significantly. Ventral pterygoideus muscles are enlarged and extremely powerful. Juveniles have small, needle-like teeth that become much more robust and narrow snouts that become broader as the individuals develop. These morphological changes correspond to shifts in the American alligators' diets, from smaller prey items such as fish and insects to larger prey items such as turtles, birds, and other large vertebrates. American alligators have broad snouts, especially in captive individuals. When the jaws are closed, the edges of the upper jaws cover the lower teeth, which fit into the jaws' hollows. Like the spectacled caiman, this species has a bony nasal ridge, though it is less prominent. American alligators are often mistaken for a similar animal: the American crocodile. An easy characteristic to distinguish the two is the fourth tooth. Whenever an American alligator's mouth is closed, the fourth tooth is no longer visible. It is enclosed in a pocket in the upper jaw. American alligators also frequently lose and replace their teeth, about once every year. As American alligators live a lengthy life, they can go through over 2,000 teeth in their lifetimes.

=== Bite ===
Adult American alligators held the record as having the strongest laboratory-measured bite of any living animal, measured at up to 13,172 N (1,343.2 kgf; 2,961 lbf). This experiment had not been, at the time of the paper published, replicated in any other crocodilians, and the same laboratory was able to measure a greater bite force of 16,414 N (1,673.8 kgf; 3,690 lbf) in saltwater crocodiles; not withstanding this very high biting force, the muscles opening the American alligator's jaw are quite weak, and the jaws can be held closed by hand or tape when an American alligator is captured. No significant difference is noted between the bite forces of male and female American alligators of equal size. Another study noted that as the American alligator increases in size, the force of its bite also increases.

=== Movement ===
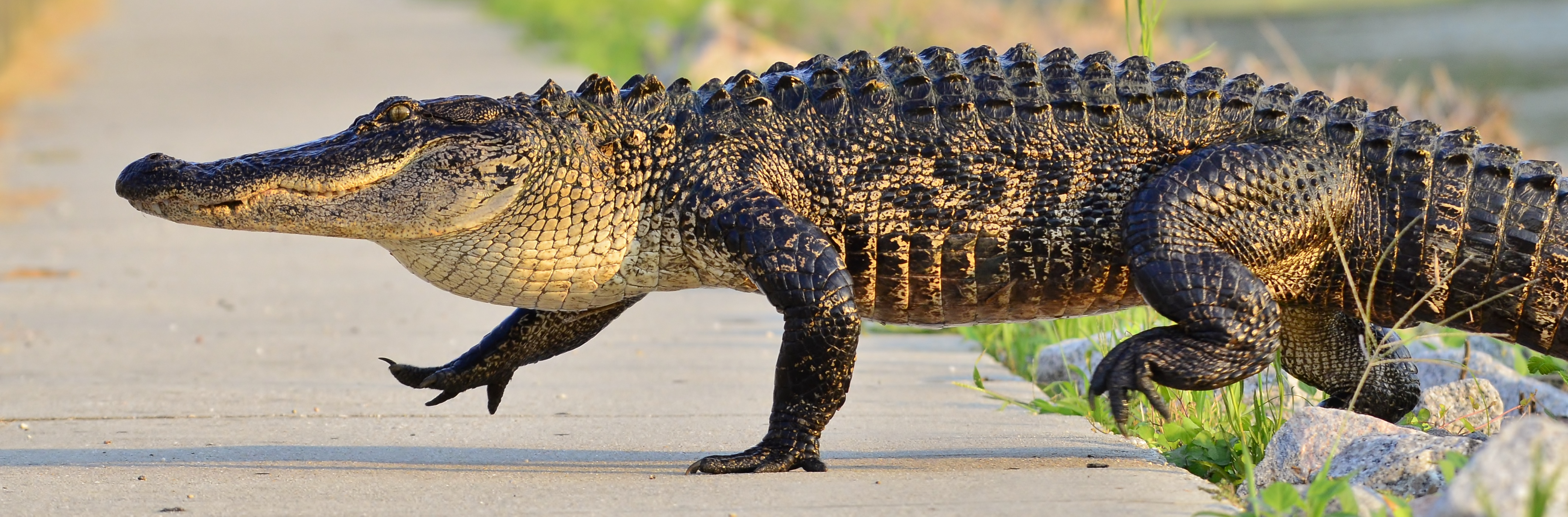
"High walk" of an American alligator

X-ray video of a female American alligator showing contraction of the lungs while breathing

When on land, an American alligator moves either by sprawling or walking, the latter involving the reptile lifting its belly off the ground. The sprawling of American alligators and other crocodylians is not similar to that of salamanders and lizards, being similar to walking. Therefore, the two forms of land locomotion can be termed the "low walk" and the "high walk". Unlike most other land vertebrates, American alligators increase their speed through the distal rather than proximal ends of their limbs.

In the water, American alligators swim like fish, moving their pelvic regions and tails from side to side. Swimming is assisted by webbed rear feet as well, which bear four toes in contrast to the five toes of the front feet. During respiration, air flow is unidirectional, looping through the lungs during inhalation and exhalation; the American alligator's abdominal muscles can alter the position of the lungs within the torso, thus shifting the center of buoyancy, which allows the American alligator to dive, rise, and roll within the water. Alligators possess an accessory respiratory muscle, the iliocostalis, that is used during periods of increased ventilatory frequency. The intensity of muscle use determines the respiration rate.

== Distribution ==
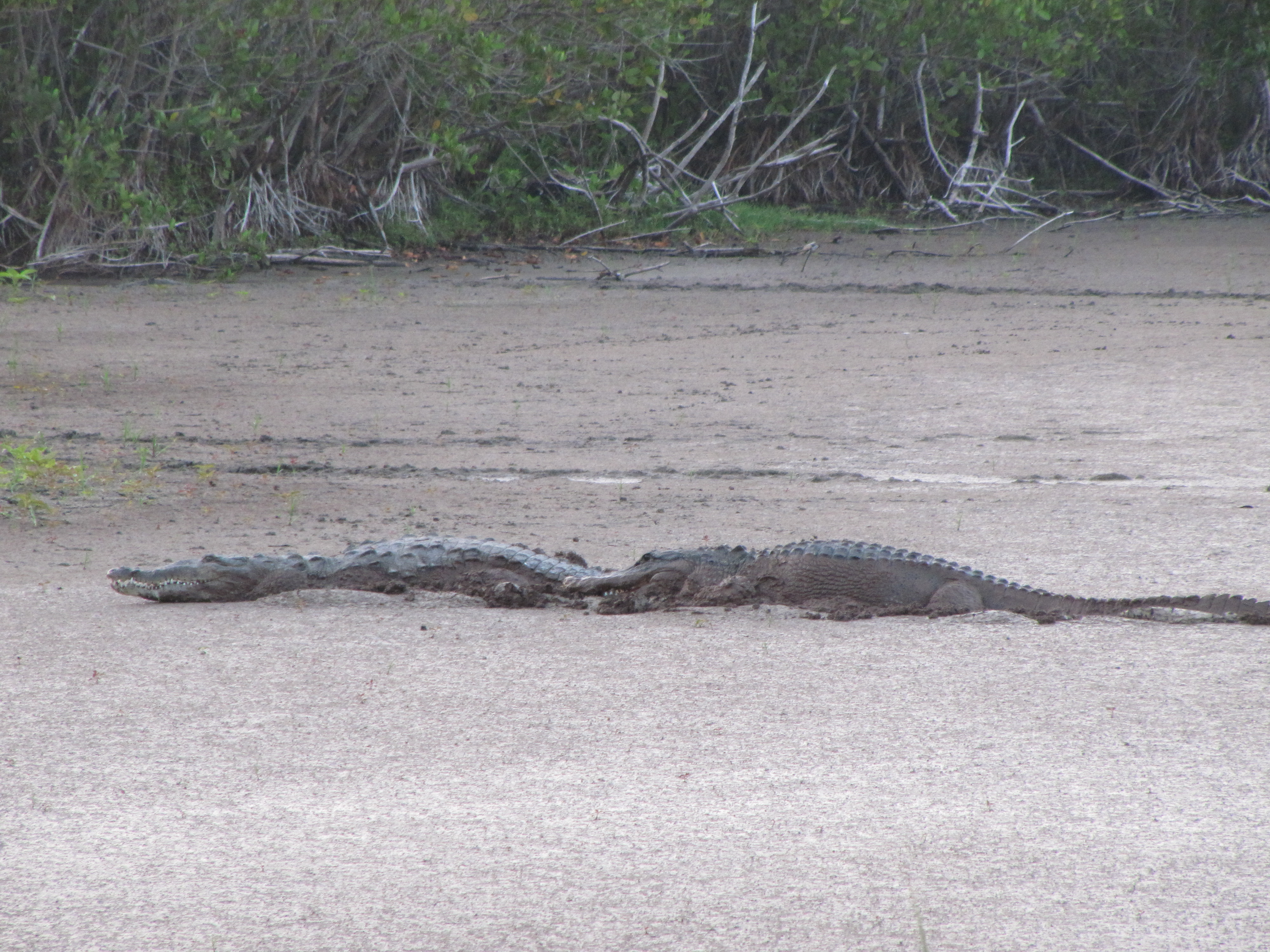
American alligator (right) and American crocodile (left) at Mrazek Pond, Florida

American alligators, being native both to the Nearctic and Neotropical realms, are found in the wild in the Southeastern United States, from the Lowcountry in South Carolina, south to Everglades National Park in Florida, and west to South Texas. They are found in parts of North Carolina, South Carolina, Georgia, Florida, Louisiana, Alabama, Mississippi, Arkansas, Oklahoma, and Texas. Some of these locations appear to be relatively recent introductions, with often small but reproductive populations. Louisiana has the largest American alligator population of any U.S. state. In the future, possible American alligator populations may be found in areas of Mexico adjacent to the Texas border. The range of the American alligator is slowly expanding northwards, including into areas they once found unsuitable, such as Virginia. American alligators have been naturally expanding their range into Tennessee, and have established a small population in the southwestern part of that state via inland waterways, according to the state's wildlife agency. They have been extirpated from Virginia, and occasional vagrants from North Carolina wander into the Great Dismal Swamp.

In 2021, an individual was found in Calvert County, Maryland, near the Chesapeake Bay, where it was shot and killed by a hunter using a crossbow. Additional reports of American alligators from this region exist, though they are believed to be escaped or released exotic pets.

== Conservation status ==
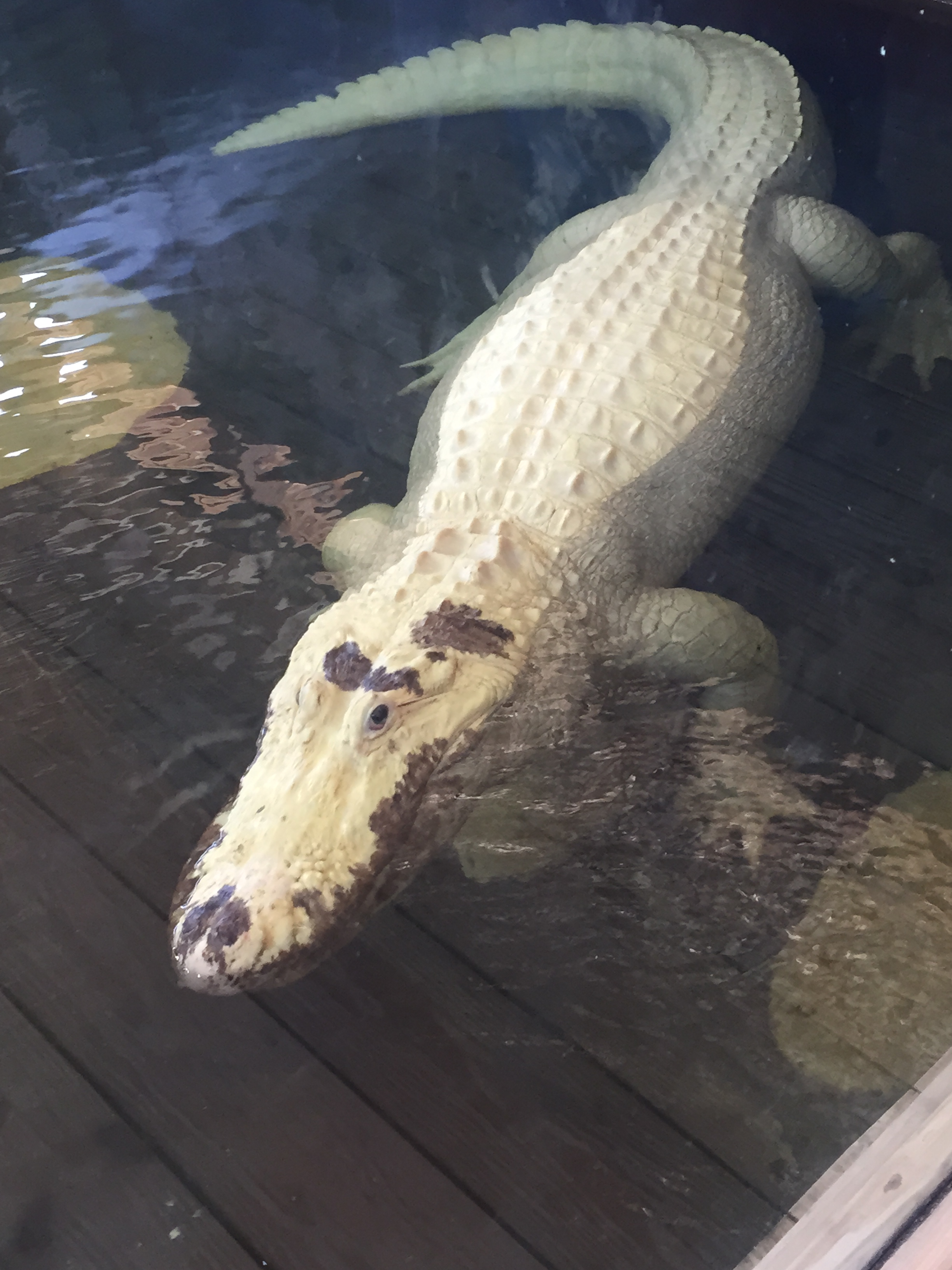
A leucistic American alligator at Gatorland

American alligators are listed as least concern by the IUCN Red List, even though from the 19th century to the mid-20th century, they were being hunted and poached by humans unsustainably.

Historically, hunting and habitat loss have severely affected American alligator populations throughout their range, and whether the species would survive was in doubt. In 1967, the American alligator was listed as an endangered species (under a law that was the precursor to the Endangered Species Act of 1973), since it was believed to be in danger of extinction throughout all or a significant portion of its range. Some states began protecting the species on their own initiative well before the federal listing; Alabama banned alligator hunting in 1938, becoming the first state to do so, nearly three decades ahead of federal protection.

Both the United States Fish and Wildlife Service (USFWS) and state wildlife agencies in the South contributed to the American alligator's recovery. Protection under the Endangered Species Act allowed the species to recuperate in many areas where it had been depleted. States began monitoring their American alligator populations to ensure that they would continue to grow. In 1987, the USFWS removed the animal from the endangered species list, as it was considered to be fully recovered. The USFWS still regulates the legal trade in American alligators and their products to protect still endangered crocodilians that may be passed off as American alligators during trafficking.

American alligators are listed under Appendix II of the Convention on International Trade in Endangered Species (CITES) meaning that international trade in the species (including parts and derivatives) is regulated.

== Habitat ==
American alligator in the Everglades

American alligators inhabit swamps, streams, rivers, ponds, and lakes as well as wetland prairies interspersed with shallow open water and canals with associated levees. A lone American alligator was spotted for over 10 years living in a river north of Atlanta, Georgia. Females and juveniles are also found in Carolina Bays and other seasonal wetlands. While they prefer fresh water, American alligators may sometimes wander into brackish water, but are less tolerant of salt water than American crocodiles, as the salt glands on their tongues do not function. One study of American alligators in north-central Florida found the males preferred open lake water during the spring, while females used both swampy and open-water areas. During summer, males still preferred open water, while females remained in the swamps to construct their nests and lay their eggs. Both sexes may den underneath banks or clumps of trees during the winter.

In some areas of their range, American alligators are an unusual example of urban wildlife; golf courses are often favored by the species due to an abundance of water and a frequent supply of prey animals such as fish and birds.

Recent research on juvenile American alligators has found that young alligators can adjust behavior in reaction to stressful environments, particularly with higher salt levels. Rather than adapting physically, juveniles have been shown to change their everyday habits – things like basking in the sun or moving between habitats – to avoid dehydration from salt water.

=== Cold tolerance ===
American alligators are less vulnerable to cold than American crocodiles. Unlike an American crocodile, which would immediately succumb to the cold and drown in water at 45 °F (7 °C) or less, an American alligator can survive in such temperatures for some time without displaying any signs of discomfort. They regulate their core temperatures by using endogenous heat production, which increases the size of the animal.This adaptiveness is thought to be why American alligators are widespread further north than the American crocodile. In fact, the American alligator is found farther from the equator and is more equipped to handle cooler conditions than any other crocodilian. When the water begins to freeze, American alligators go into a period of brumation; they stick their snouts through the surface, which allows them to breathe above the ice, and they can remain in this state for several days.

== Ecology and behavior ==
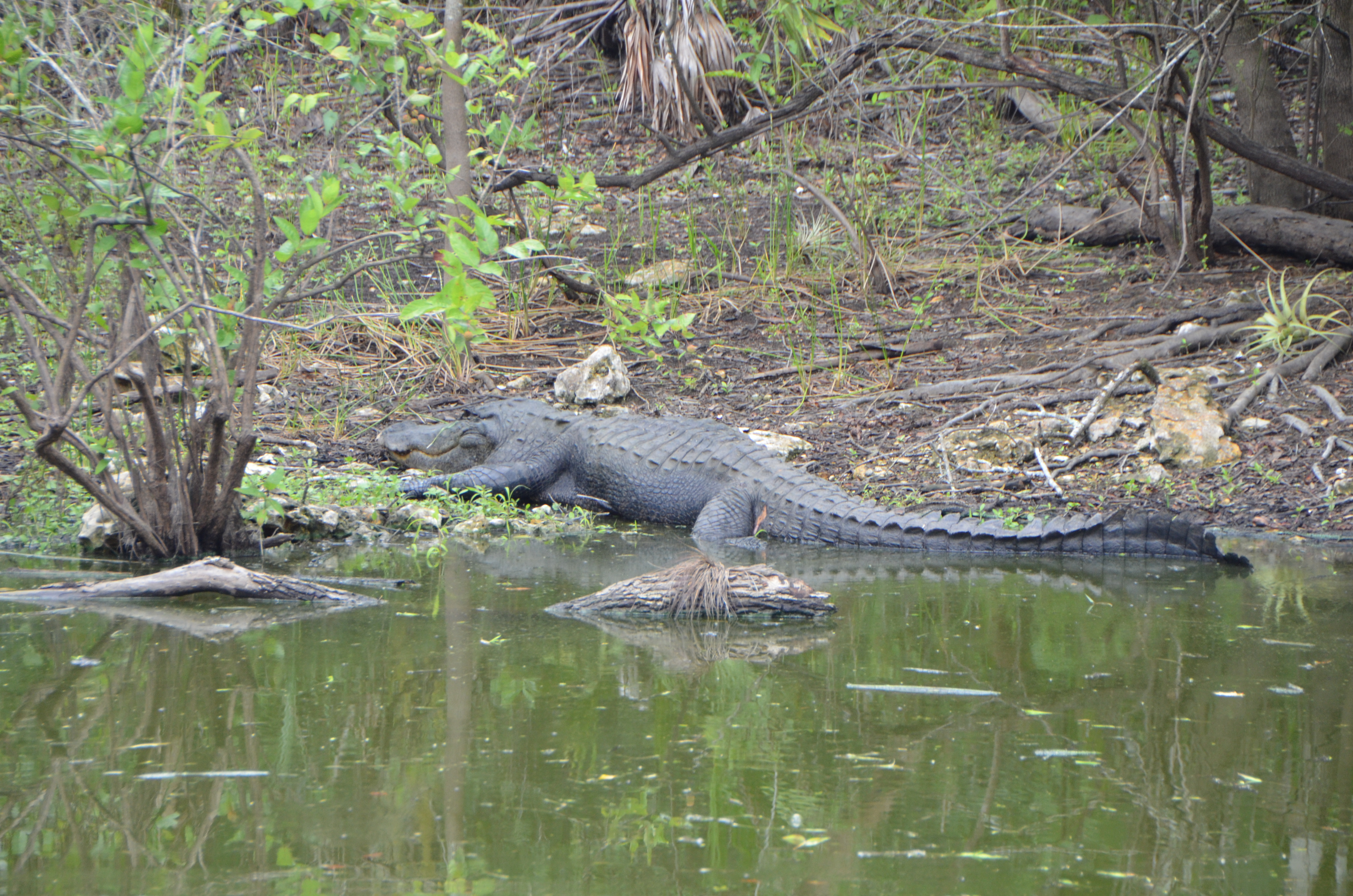
An American alligator basks on the bank of a pond in Big Cypress National Preserve.

=== Basking ===
American alligators primarily bask on shore, but also climb into and perch on tree limbs to bask if no shoreline is available. This is not often seen, since if disturbed, they quickly retreat back into the water by jumping from their perch.

=== Holes ===
American alligators modify wetland habitats, most dramatically in flat areas such as the Everglades, by constructing small ponds known as alligator holes. Alligators also tunnel into banks and create dens above water level with access to air.This behavior has qualified the American alligator to be considered a keystone species. Alligator holes retain water during the dry season and provide a refuge for aquatic organisms, which survive the dry season by seeking refuge in alligator holes, so are a source of future populations. The construction of nests along the periphery of alligator holes, as well as a buildup of soils during the excavation process, provides drier areas for other reptiles to nest and a place for plants that are intolerant of inundation to colonize. Alligator holes are an oasis during the Everglades dry season, so are consequently important foraging sites for other organisms. In the limestone depressions of cypress swamps, alligator holes tend to be large and deep, while those in marl prairies and rocky glades are usually small and shallow, and those in peat depressions of ridge and slough wetlands are more variable. When alligators dig nesting holes, raised soil creates refuges that can be used by reptiles and birds for nests during flood season, as well as increasing plant germination in areas that are prone to flooding. The American alligator is a foundational species in the everglades, acting as "ecological engineers" that helps the ecosystem prosper.

=== Feeding ===
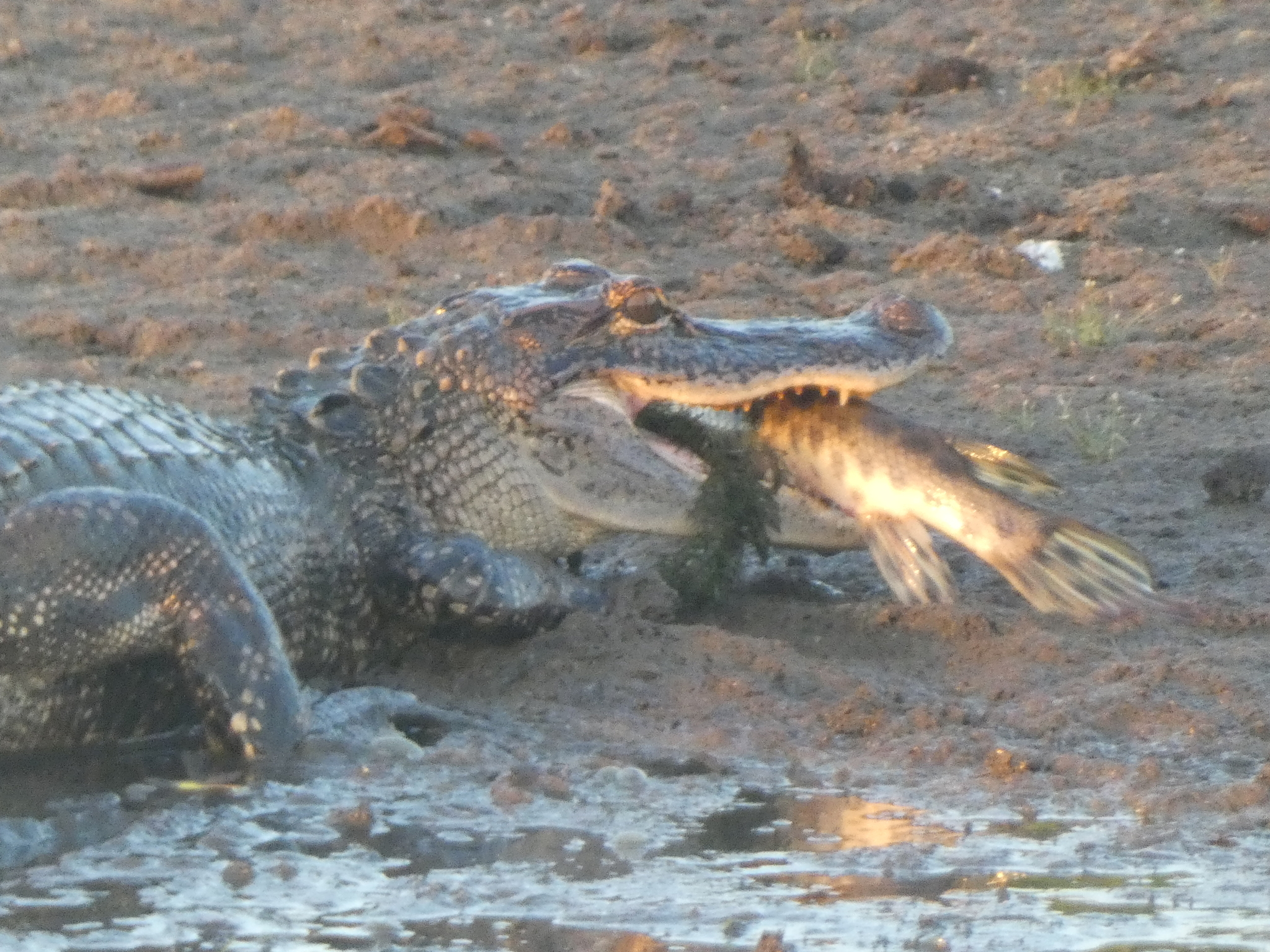
Eating a Florida gar

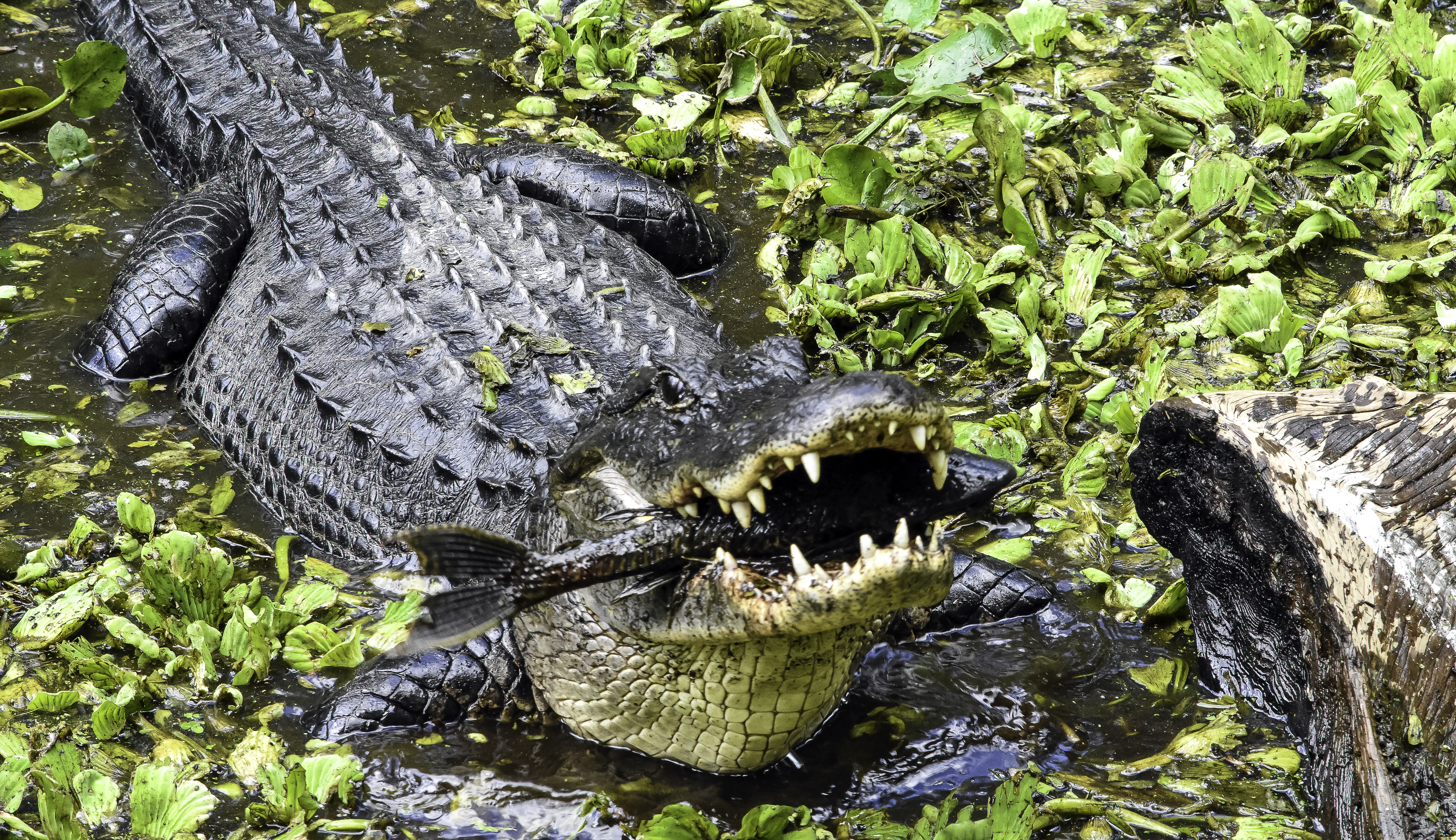
Eating a pleco

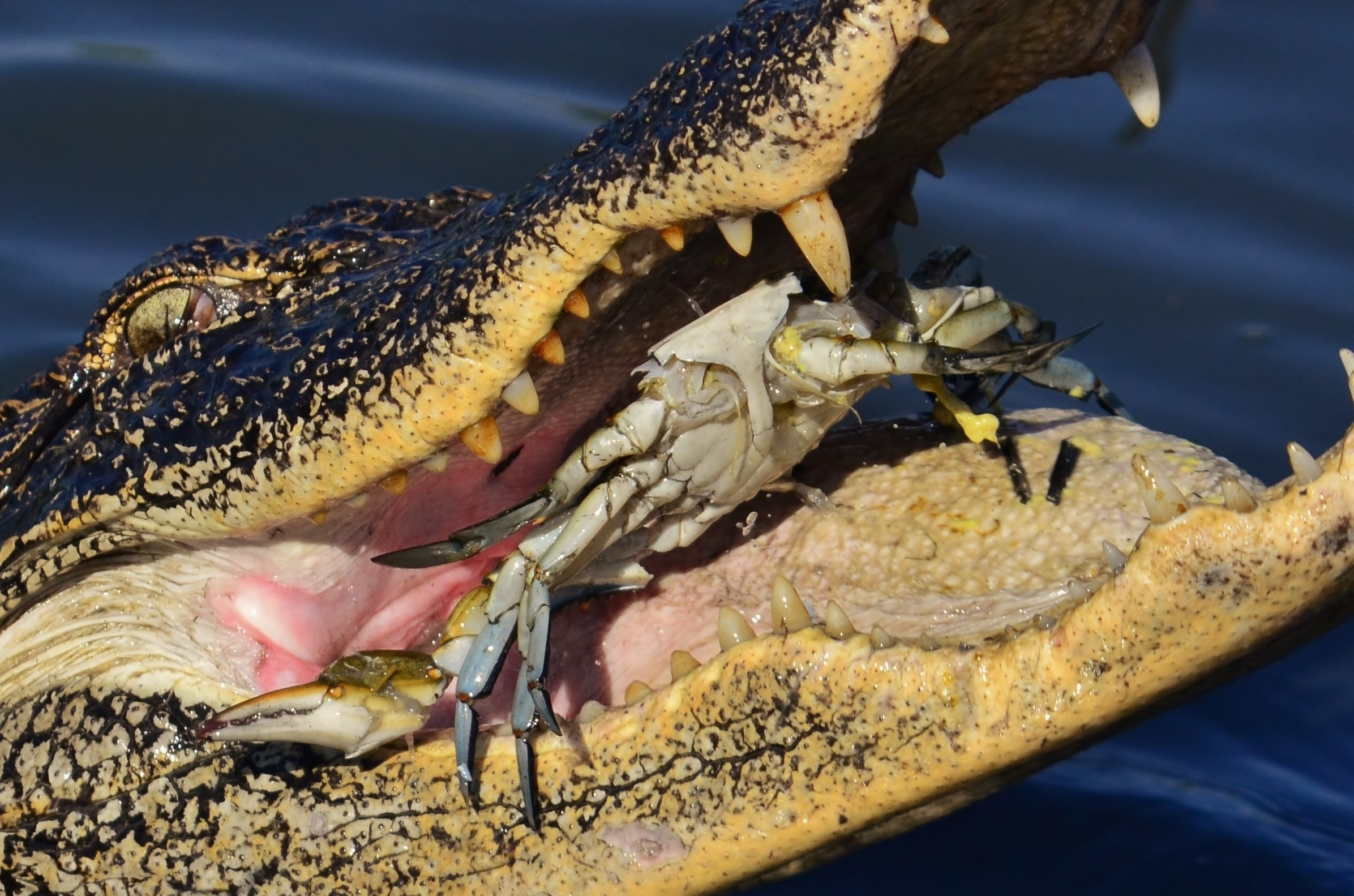
Eating a swimmer crab

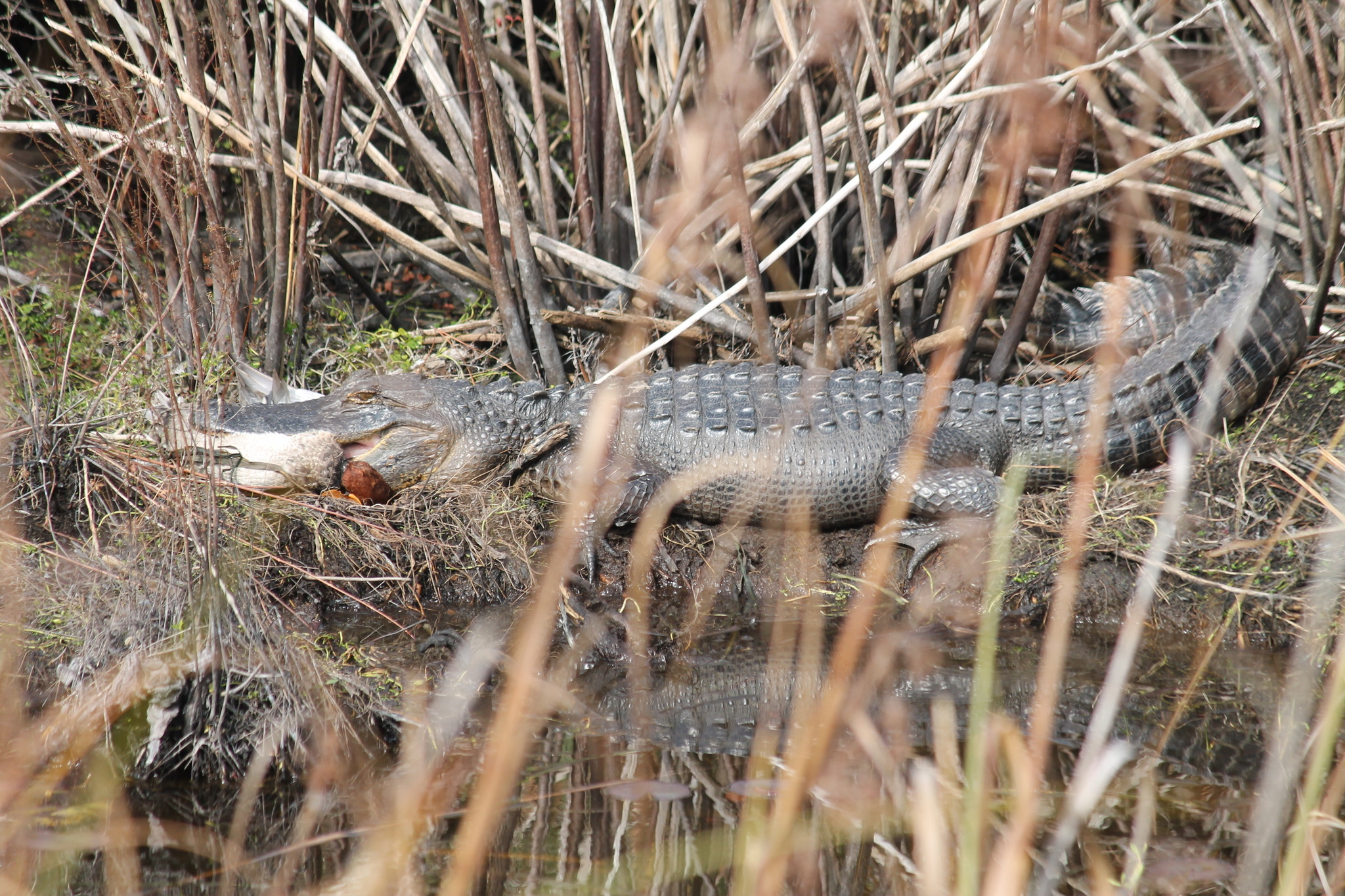
Eating a redhead duck

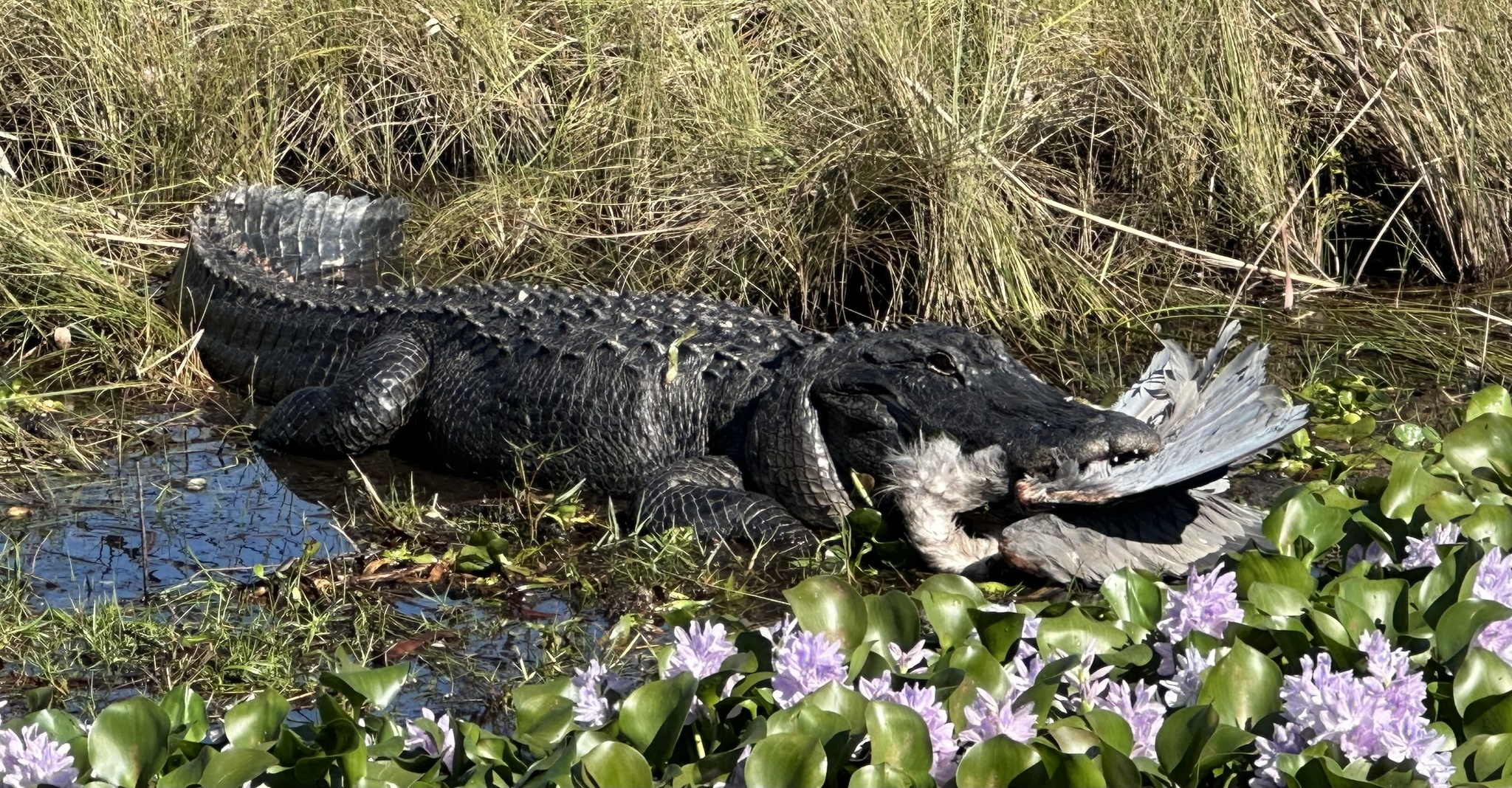
Eating a great blue heron

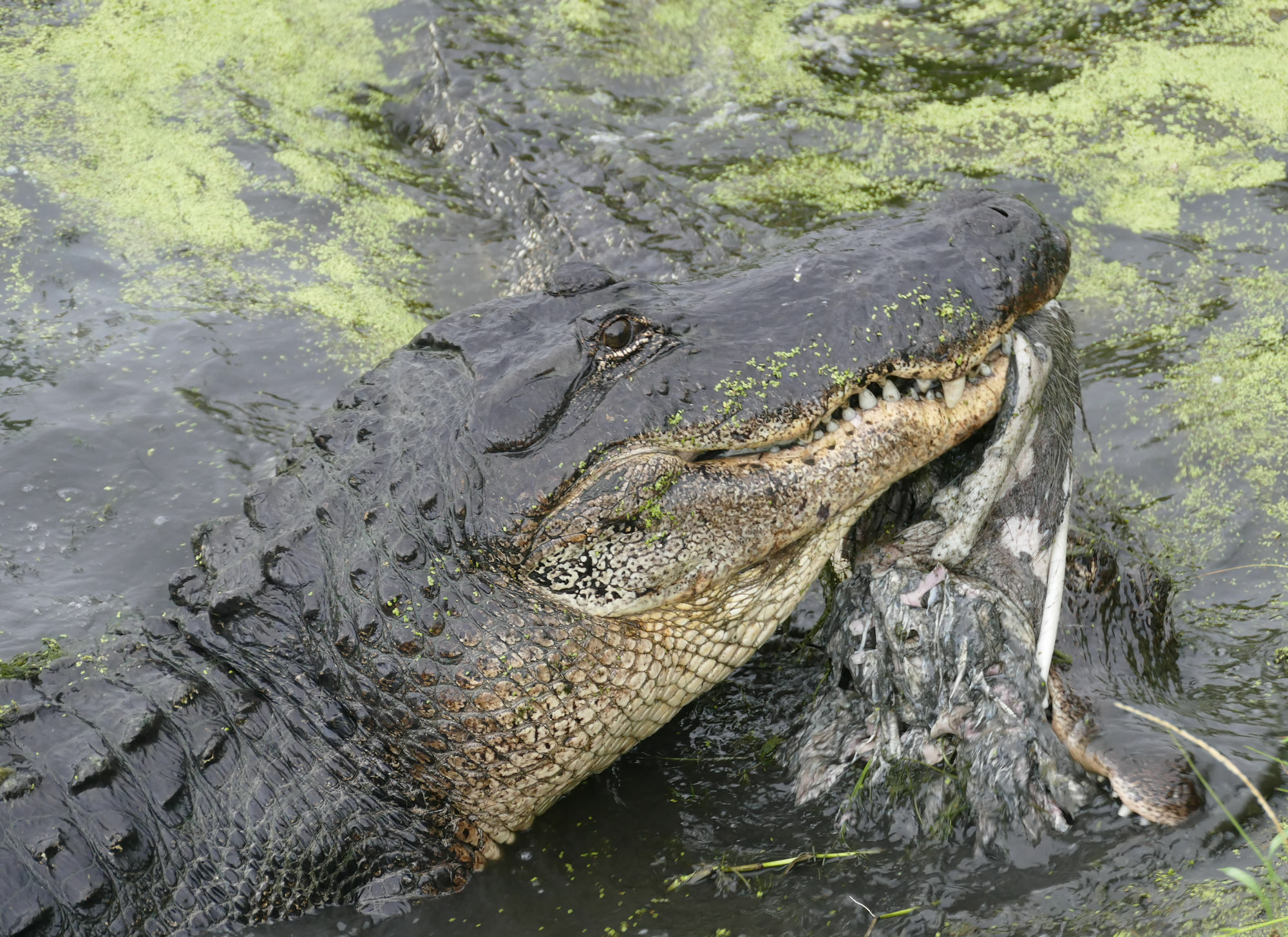
Eating a feral pig

==== Bite and mastication ====
The teeth of the American alligator are designed to grip prey, but cannot rip or chew flesh like teeth of some other predators (such as canids and felids), and depend on their gizzard and consuming rocks to grind their food instead. The attainment of adulthood enables the consumption of large mammals and the crushing of large turtles. The American alligator is capable of biting through a turtle's shell or a moderately sized mammal bone. Additionally, the palate of American alligators enables them to capture prey underwater without flooding their respiratory system with water

==== Possible tool use ====
American alligators have been documented using lures to hunt prey such as birds. This means they are among the first reptiles recorded to use tools. By balancing sticks and branches on their heads, American alligators are able to lure birds looking for suitable nesting material to kill and consume. This strategy, which is shared by the mugger crocodile, is particularly effective during the nesting season, in which birds are more likely to gather appropriate nesting materials. This strategy has been documented in two Florida zoos occurring multiple times a day in peak nesting season and in some parks in Louisiana. The use of tools was documented primarily during the peak rookery season when birds were primarily looking for sticks.

However, a three-day experiment to reproduce the use of sticks as lures, published in 2019, failed to document the behavior. Researchers placed sticks at densities of 30 to 35 sticks per meter squared near four captive populations, two near rookeries and two at no-rookery sites. While stick-displaying behavior was observed several times, it was not more frequent near rookeries. In fact, in some comparisons, it was associated with no-rookery sites. This implies American alligators do not tailor this behavior to specific contexts, leaving the purpose, if any, of stick-displaying ambiguous.

Predators

American Alligators do deal with predators while they are babies/juveniles and are often eaten by larger wading birds (Herons and egrets), otters, snakes, raccoons, large fish, and other American Alligators.

==== Aquatic vs terrestrial prey ====
Fish and other aquatic prey taken in the water or at the water's edge form the major part of American alligator's diet and may be eaten at any time of the day or night. Adult American alligators also spend considerable time hunting on land, up to 160 feet (50 m) from water, ambushing terrestrial animals on trailsides and road shoulders. Usually, terrestrial hunting occurs on nights with warm temperatures. When hunting terrestrial prey, American alligators may also ambush them from the edge of the water by grabbing them and pulling the prey into the water, the preferred method of predation of larger crocodiles.

Additionally, American alligators have recently been filmed and documented killing and eating sharks and rays; four incidents documented indicated that bonnetheads, lemon sharks, Atlantic stingrays, and nurse sharks are components of the animal's diet. Sharks are also known to prey on American alligators, in turn, indicating that encounters between the two predators are common.

==== Common prey ====
American alligators are considered an apex predator throughout their range. They are opportunists and their diet is determined largely by both their size and age and the size and availability of prey. Most American alligators eat a wide variety of animals, including invertebrates, fish, birds, turtles, snakes, amphibians, and mammals. Hatchlings mostly feed on invertebrates such as insects, insect larvae, snails, spiders, and worms, as well as small fish and frogs. As they grow, American alligators gradually expand to larger prey. Once an American alligator reaches full size and power in adulthood, any animal living in the water or coming to the water to drink is potential prey. Most animals captured by American alligators are considerably smaller than itself. A few examples of animals consumed are largemouth bass, spotted gar, freshwater pearl mussels, American green tree frogs, yellow mud turtles, cottonmouths, common moorhens, and feral wild boars. Stomach contents show, among native mammals, muskrats and raccoons are some of the most commonly eaten species. In Louisiana, where introduced nutria are common, they are perhaps the most regular prey for adult American alligators, although only larger adults commonly eat this species. It has also been reported that large American alligators prey on medium-sized American alligators, which had preyed on hatchlings and smaller juveniles.

If an American alligator's primary food resource is not available, it will sometimes feed on carrion and non-prey items such as rocks and artificial objects, like bottle caps. These items help the American alligator in the process of digestion by crushing up the meat and bones of animals, especially animals with shells.

==== Large animals ====
Other animals may occasionally be eaten, even large deer or feral wild boars, but these are not normally part of the diet. American alligators occasionally prey on large mammals, but usually do so when fish and smaller prey levels go down. Rarely, American alligators have been observed killing and eating bobcats, but such events are not common and have little effect on bobcat populations. Although American alligators have been listed as predators of the nilgai and the West Indian manatees, very little evidence exists of such predation. In the 2000s, when invasive Burmese pythons first occupied the Everglades, American alligators have been recorded preying on sizable snakes, possibly controlling populations and preventing the invasive species from spreading northwards. However, the Burmese python is also known to occasionally prey on American alligators, a form of both competition and predation. American alligator predation on Florida panthers is rare, but has been documented. Such incidents usually involve a panther trying to cross a waterway or coming down to a swamp or river to get a drink. American alligator predation on American black bears has also been recorded.

==== Domestic animals ====
Occasionally, domestic animals, including dogs, cats, and calves, are taken as available, but are secondary to wild and feral prey. Other prey, including snakes, lizards, and various invertebrates, are eaten occasionally by adults.

==== Birds ====
Water birds, such as herons, egrets, storks, waterfowl and large dabbling rails such as gallinules or coots, are taken when possible. Occasionally, unwary adult birds are grabbed and eaten by American alligators, but most predation on bird species occurs with unsteady fledgling birds in late summer, as fledgling birds attempt to make their first flights near the water's edge.

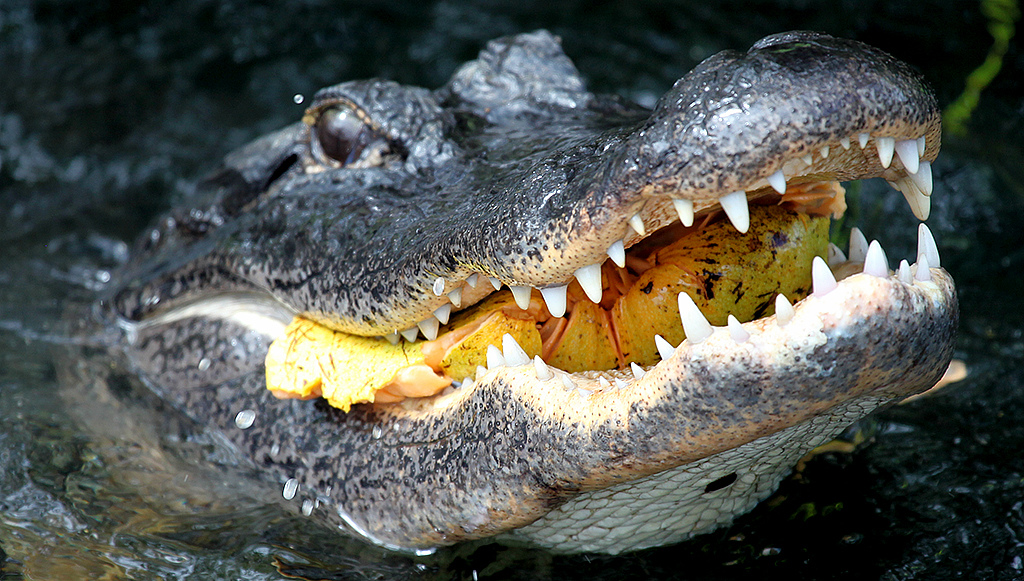
Eating a pond apple

==== Fruit ====
In 2013, American alligators and other crocodilians were reported to also eat fruit. Such behavior has been witnessed, as well as documented from stomach contents, with the American alligators eating such fruit as wild grapes, elderberries, and citrus fruits directly from the trees. Thirty-four families and 46 genera of plants were represented among seeds and fruits found in the stomach contents of American alligators. The discovery of this unexpected part of the American alligator diet further reveals that they may be responsible for spreading seeds from the fruit they consume across their habitat.

==== Cooperative hunting ====
Additionally, American alligators engage in what seems to be cooperative hunting. One observation of cooperative hunting techniques was where there are pushing American alligators and catching American alligators and they were observed taking turns in each position. Another observation said that about 60 American alligators gathered in an area and would form a semicircle with about half of them and would push the fish closer to the bank. Once one of the American alligators caught a fish another one would enter into its spot, and it would take the fish to the resting area. This was reported to have occurred two days in a row.

==== In Florida and East Texas ====
The diet of adult American alligators from central Florida lakes is dominated by fish, but the species is highly opportunistic based upon local availability. In Lake Griffin, fish made up 54% of the diet by weight, with catfish being most commonly consumed, while in Lake Apopka, fish made up 90% of the food and mostly shad were taken; in Lake Woodruff, the diet was 84% fish and largely consists of bass and sunfish. Unusually in these regions, reptiles and amphibians were the most important nonpiscivore prey, mostly turtles and water snakes. In southern Louisiana, crustaceans (largely crawfish and crabs) were found to be present in the southeastern American alligators, but largely absent in southwestern American alligators, which consumed a relatively high proportion of reptiles, although fish were the most recorded prey for adults, and adult males consumed a large portion of mammals.

In East Texas, diets were diverse and adult American alligators took mammals, reptiles, amphibians, and invertebrates (e.g. snails) in often equal measure as they did fish. However, across all sizes, sexes, and study sites, more than 85 % of the individual prey items were invertebrates. With smaller (non‑breeding) alligators consuming invertebrate prey in larger proportions by biomass and frequency than larger (breeding‑size) individuals.

Human influence on feeding

Recent studies have shown that human altered environments – particularly golf courses – can have significant impacts on the diets of local alligators. Stomach content analysis revealed that in areas where humans manage the landscape more heavily, alligators often rely heavily on insects and spiders. Alligators in more natural environments, meanwhile, were found to consume more crustaceans and fish. This research highlights how human development directly shapes foraging habits of American Alligators.

=== Vocalizations ===
Alligator bellow
Alligator bellow, ogg/Vorbis format

Alligator hiss
Alligator hiss ogg/Vorbis format

==== Mechanism ====
An American alligator is able to abduct and adduct the vocal folds of its larynx, but not to elongate or shorten them; yet in spite of this, it can modulate fundamental frequency very well. Their vocal folds consists of epithelium, lamina propria and muscle. Sounds ranged from 50 to 1200 Hz. In one experiment conducted on the larynx, the fundamental frequency depended on both the glottal gap and stiffness of the larynx tissues. As the frequency increases, there's high tension and large strains. The fundamental frequency has been influenced by the glottal gap size and subglottal pressure and when the phonation threshold pressure has been exceeded, there will be vocal fold vibration.

==== Calls ====
Crocodilians are the most vocal of all non-avian reptiles and have a variety of different calls depending on the age, size, and sex of the animal. The American alligator can perform specific vocalizations to declare territory, signal distress, threaten competitors, and locate suitable mates. Juveniles can perform a high-pitched hatchling call (a "yelping" trait common to many crocodilian species' hatchling young) to alert their mothers when they are ready to emerge from the nest. Juveniles also make a distress call to alert their mothers if they are being threatened. Adult American alligators can growl, hiss, or cough to threaten others and declare territory.

==== Bellowing ====
Both males and females bellow loudly by sucking air into their lungs and blowing it out in intermittent, deep-toned roars that likely serve to advertise their presence. Males are known to use infrasound during mating bellows. Their bellowing initiates the beginning of the courtship period for American alligators. Bellowing is performed in a "head oblique, tail arched" posture. Infrasonic waves from a bellowing male can cause the surface of the water directly over and to either side of his back to literally "sprinkle", in what is commonly called the "water dance". Large bellowing "choruses" of American alligators during the breeding season are commonly initiated by females and perpetuated by males. Observers of large bellowing choruses have noted they are often felt more than they are heard due to the intense infrasound emitted by males. American alligators bellow in B flat (specifically "B♭_{1}", defined as an audio frequency of 58.27 Hz), and bellowing choruses can be induced by tuba players, sonic booms, and large aircraft.

=== Lifespan ===
American alligators typically live to the age of 50, and possibly over 70 years old. Males reach sexual maturity at around 11.6 years, and females at around 15.8 years. Although it was originally thought that American alligators never stop growing, studies have now found that males stop growing at around the age of 43 years, and females stop growing at around the age of 31 years.

=== Reproduction ===
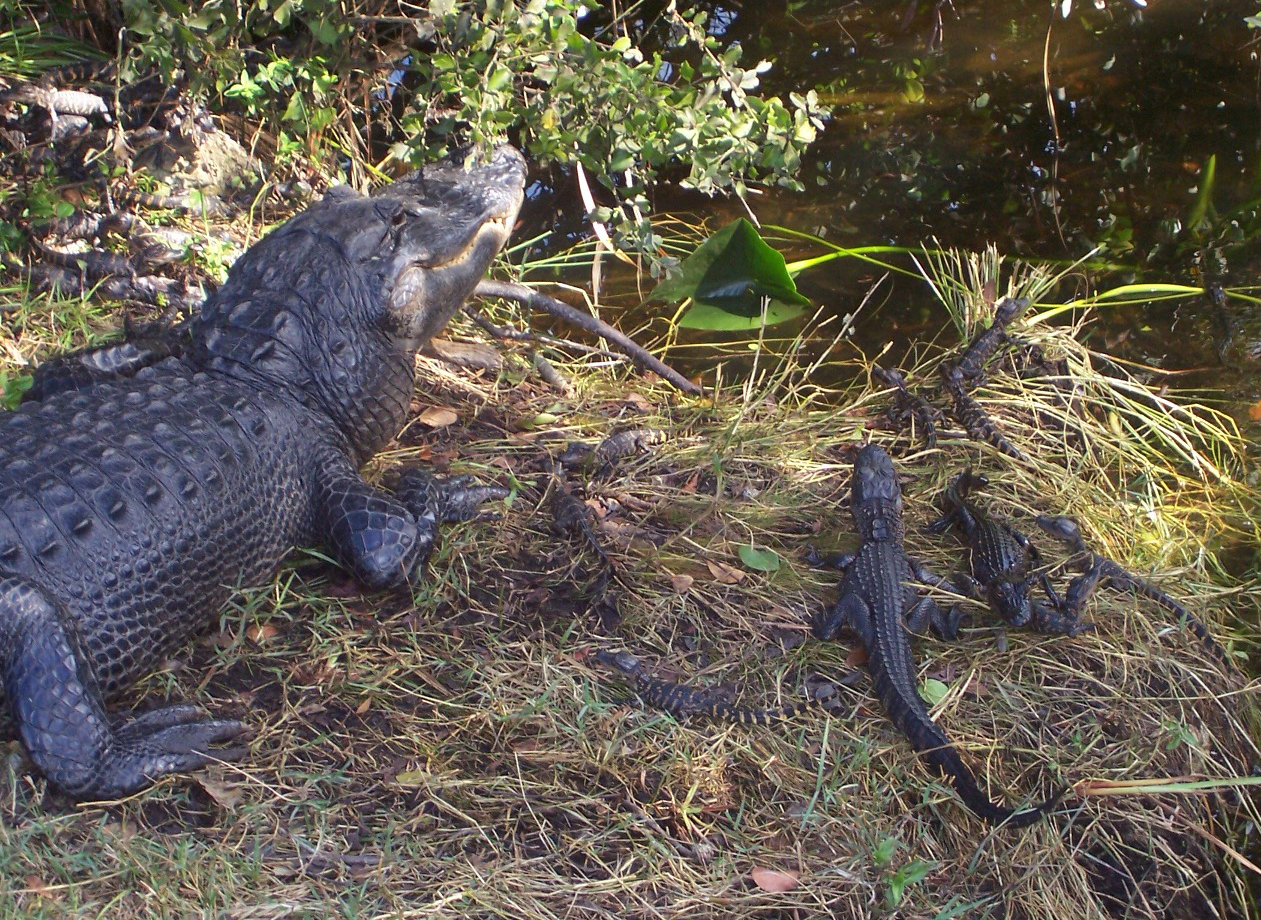
An adult American alligator at its nest accompanied by juveniles of various sizes

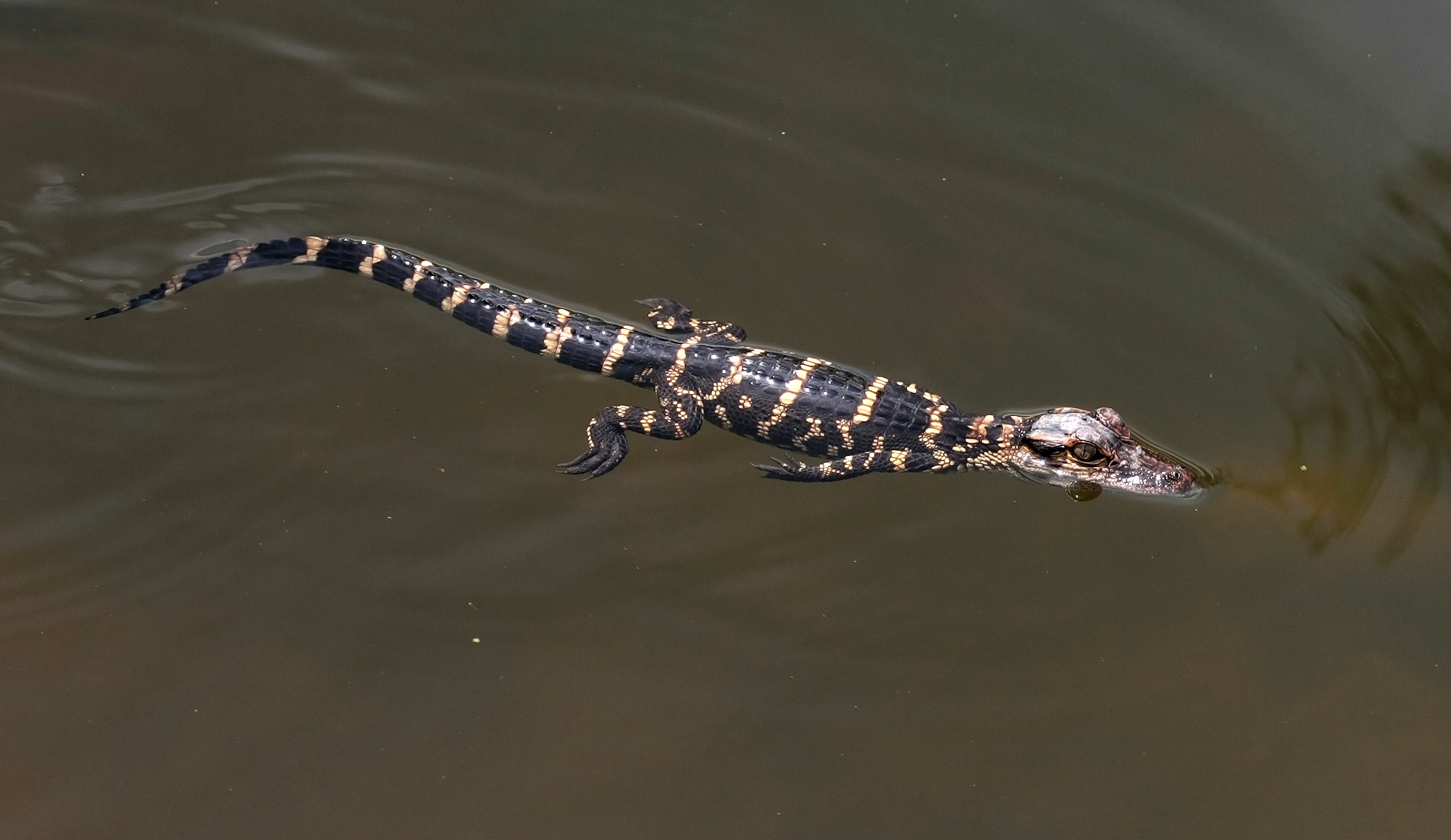
Young American alligator swimming, showing the distinctive yellow striping found on juveniles

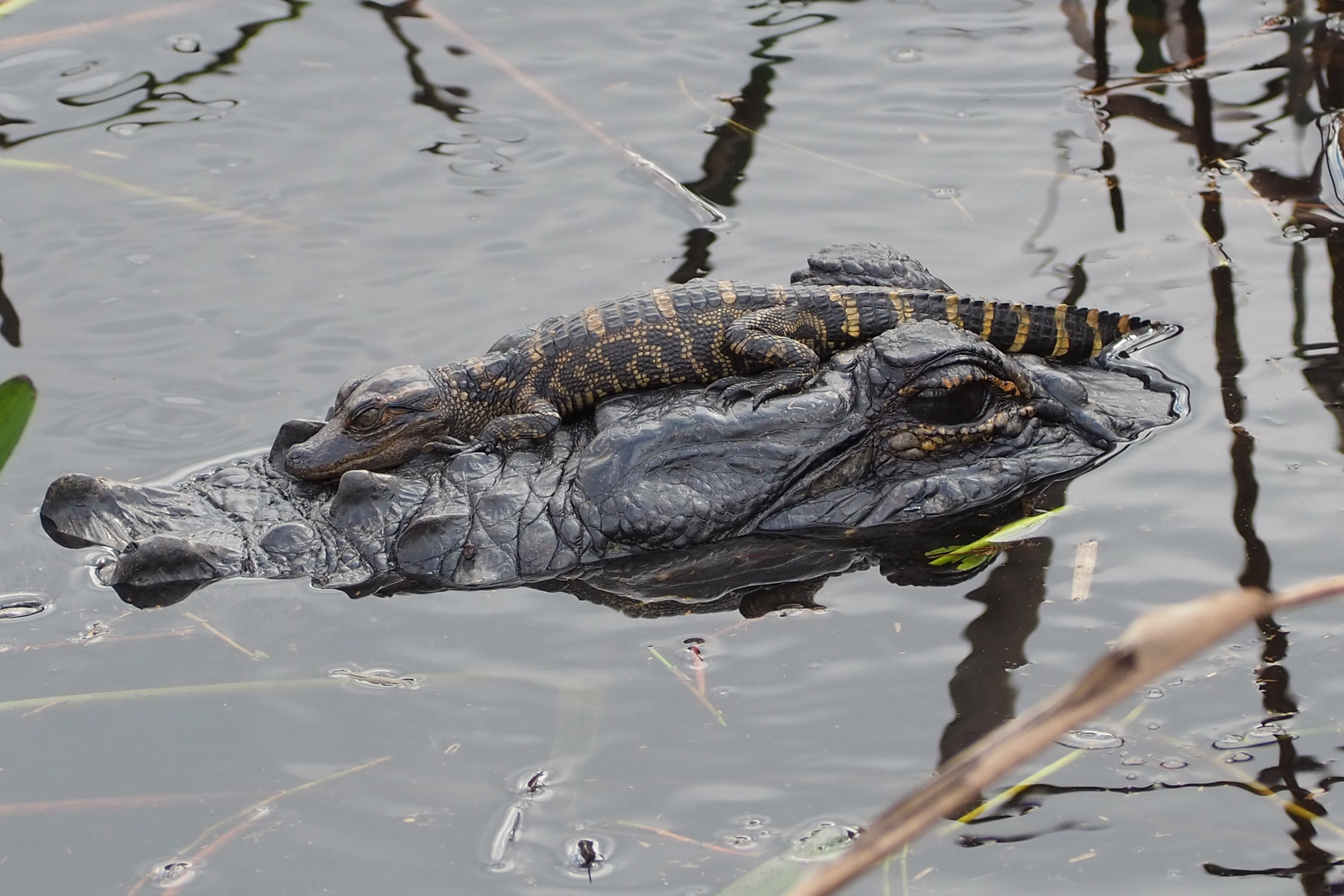
Juvenile resting on adult

==== Breeding season ====
The breeding season begins in the spring. On spring nights, American alligators gather in large numbers for group courtship, in the aforementioned "water dances". A study conducted in the 1980s at an alligator farm showed that homosexual courtship is common, with two-thirds of the recorded instances of sexual behaviour having been between two males. Multiple paternity is thought to occur. The female builds a nest of vegetation, sticks, leaves, and mud in a sheltered spot in or near the water.

==== Eggs ====
After the female lays her 20 to 50 white eggs, about the size of a goose egg, she covers them with more vegetation, which heats as it decays, helping to keep the eggs warm. This differs from Nile crocodiles, which lay their eggs in pits. The temperature at which American alligator eggs develop determines their sex (see temperature-dependent sex determination). Studies have found that eggs hatched at a temperature below 88.7 °F (31.5 °C) or a temperature above 94.1 °F (34.5 °C) will produce female offspring, while those at a temperature between 90.5 and 92.3 °F (32.5 and 33.5 °C) will produce male offspring. The nests built on levees are warmer, thus produce males, while the cooler nests of wet marsh produce females. The female remains near the nest throughout the 65-day incubation period, protecting it from intruders. When the young begin to hatch — their "yelping" calls can sometimes even be heard just before hatching commences — the mother quickly digs them out and carries them to the water in her mouth, as some other crocodilian species are known to do.

==== Young ====
The young are tiny replicas of adults, with a series of yellow bands around their bodies that serve as camouflage. Hatchlings gather into pods and are guarded by their mother and keep in contact with her through their "yelping" vocalizations. Young American alligators eat small fish, frogs, crayfish, and insects. They are preyed on by large fish, birds, raccoons, Florida panthers, and adult American alligators. Mother American alligators eventually become more aggressive towards their young, which encourages them to disperse. Young American alligators grow 3–8 in (7.6–20.3 cm) a year and reach adulthood at 6 ft (1.8 m).

=== Parasites ===
American alligators are commonly infected with parasites. In a 2016 Texas study, 100% of the specimens collected were infected with parasites, and by at least 20 different species of parasites, including lung pentastomids, gastric nematodes, and intestinal helminths. When compared to American alligators from different states there was no significant difference in prevalence.

=== Interactions with exotic species ===
Nutria were introduced into coastal marshes from South America in the mid-20th century, and their population has since exploded into the millions. They cause serious damage to coastal marshes and may dig burrows in levees. Hence, Louisiana has had a bounty to try to reduce nutria numbers. Large American alligators feed heavily on nutria, so American alligators may not only control nutria populations in Louisiana, but also prevent them spreading east into the Everglades. Since hunting and trapping preferentially take the large American alligators that are the most important in eating nutria, some changes in harvesting may be needed to capitalize on their ability to control nutria.

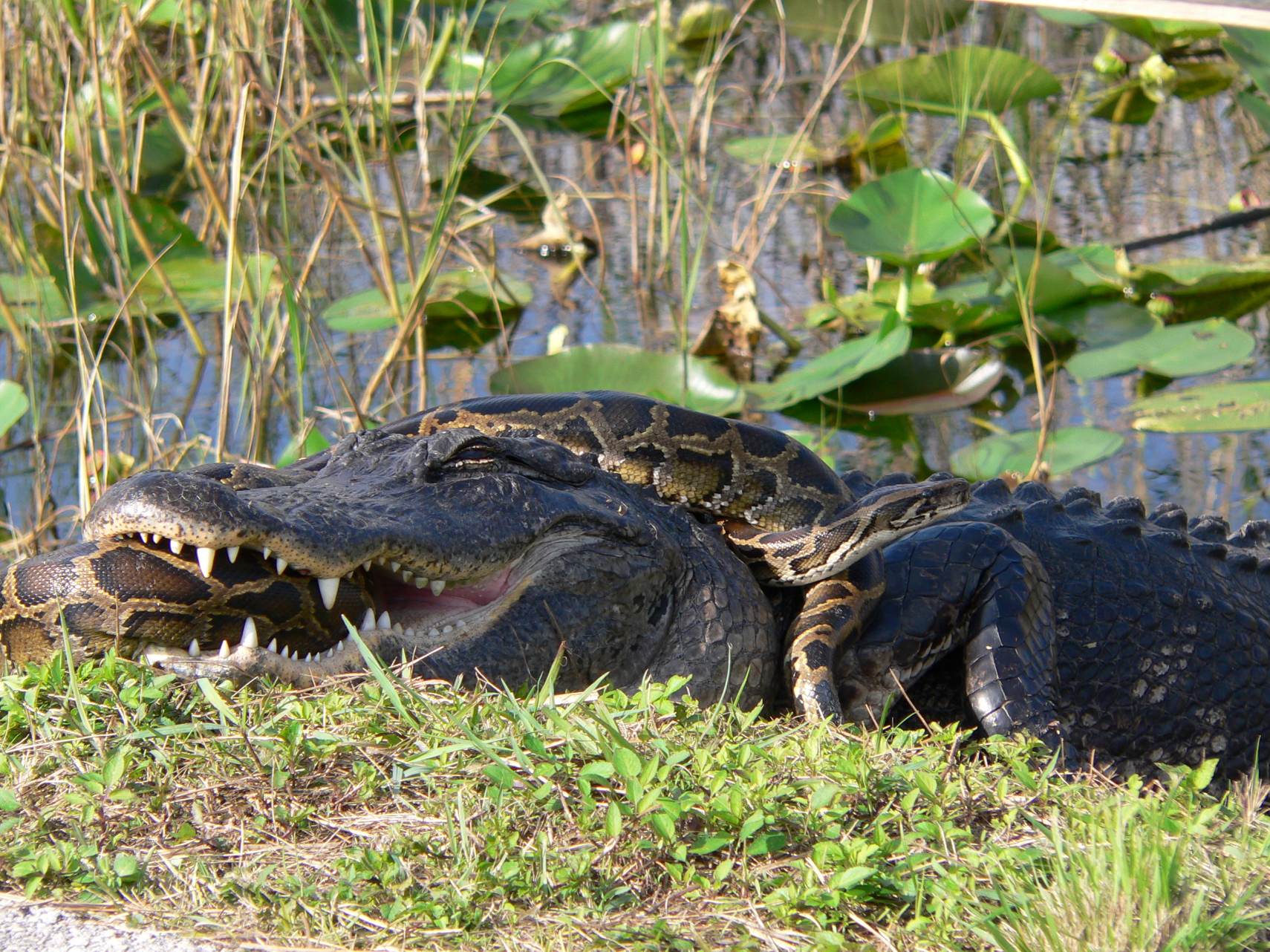
Killing an invasive Burmese python, which is attempting to coil around it

Recently, a population of Burmese pythons became established in Everglades National Park. Substantial American alligator populations in the Everglades might be a contributing factor, as a competitor, in keeping the python populations low, preventing the spread of the species north. While events of predation by Burmese pythons on sizable American alligators have been observed, no evidence of a net negative effect has been seen on overall American alligator populations.

In Florida, American alligators may be eaten by some growth stage of other invasive snakes such as reticulated pythons, Southern African rock pythons, Central African rock pythons, boa constrictors, yellow anacondas, Bolivian anacondas, dark-spotted anacondas, and green anacondas.

Young American alligators have been documented consuming a large number of invasive apple snails in north-central Florida. This trend may be visible across other areas where the range of both species intersects.

=== Indicators of environmental restoration ===
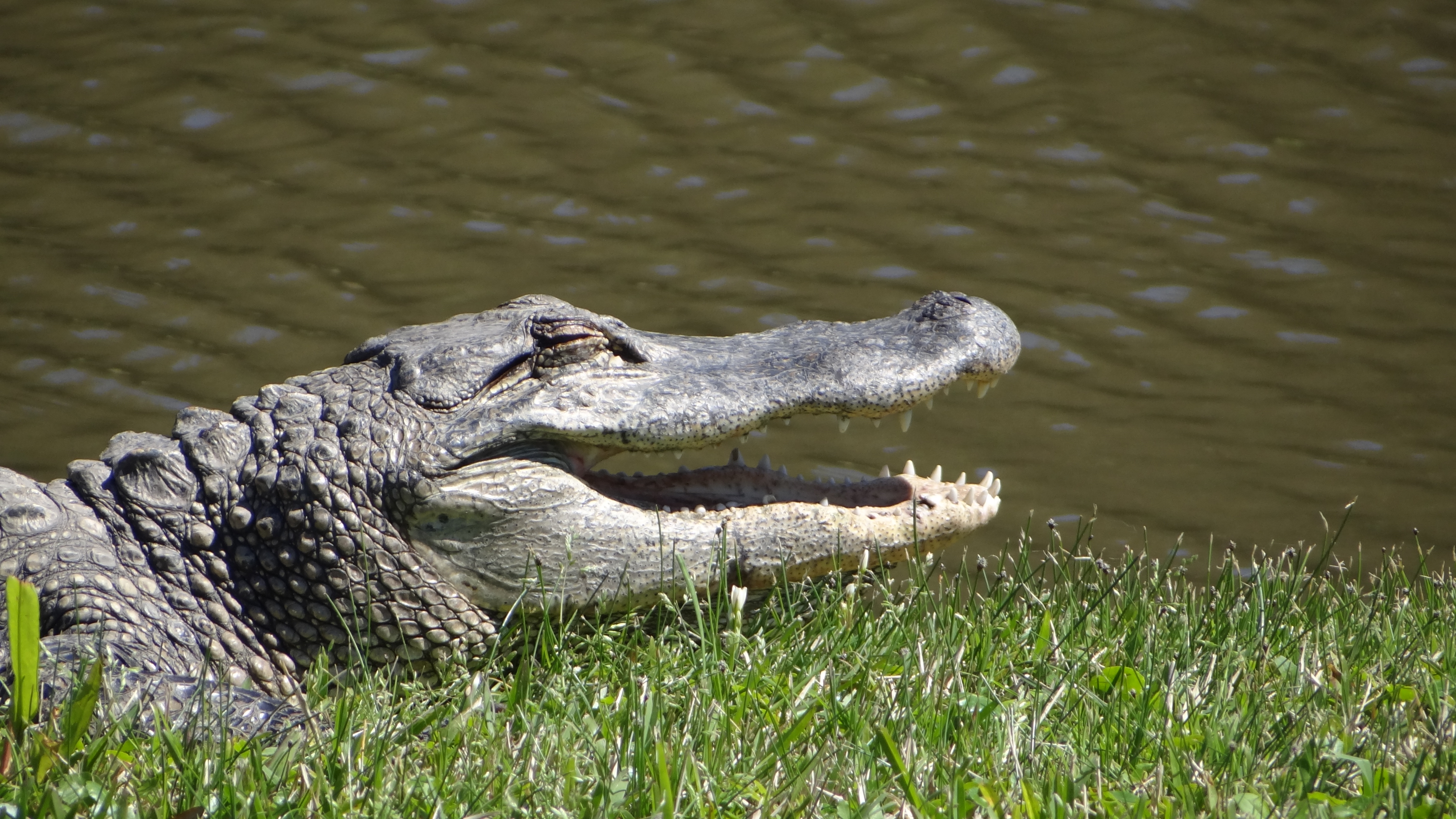
American alligator at Avery Island, Louisiana

American alligators play an important role in the restoration of the Everglades as biological indicators of restoration success. American alligators are highly sensitive to changes in the hydrology, salinity, and productivity of their ecosystems; all are factors that are expected to change with Everglades restoration. American alligators also may control the long-term vegetation dynamics in wetlands by reducing the population of small mammals, particularly nutria, which may otherwise overgraze marsh vegetation. In this way, the vital ecological service they provide may be important in reducing rates of coastal wetland losses in Louisiana. They may provide a protection service for water birds nesting on islands in freshwater wetlands. American alligators prevent predatory mammals from reaching island-based rookeries and in return eat spilled food and birds that fall from their nests. Wading birds appear to be attracted to areas with American alligators and have been known to nest at heavily trafficked tourist attractions with large numbers of American alligators, such as the St. Augustine Alligator Farm in St. Augustine, Florida.

== Relationship with humans ==
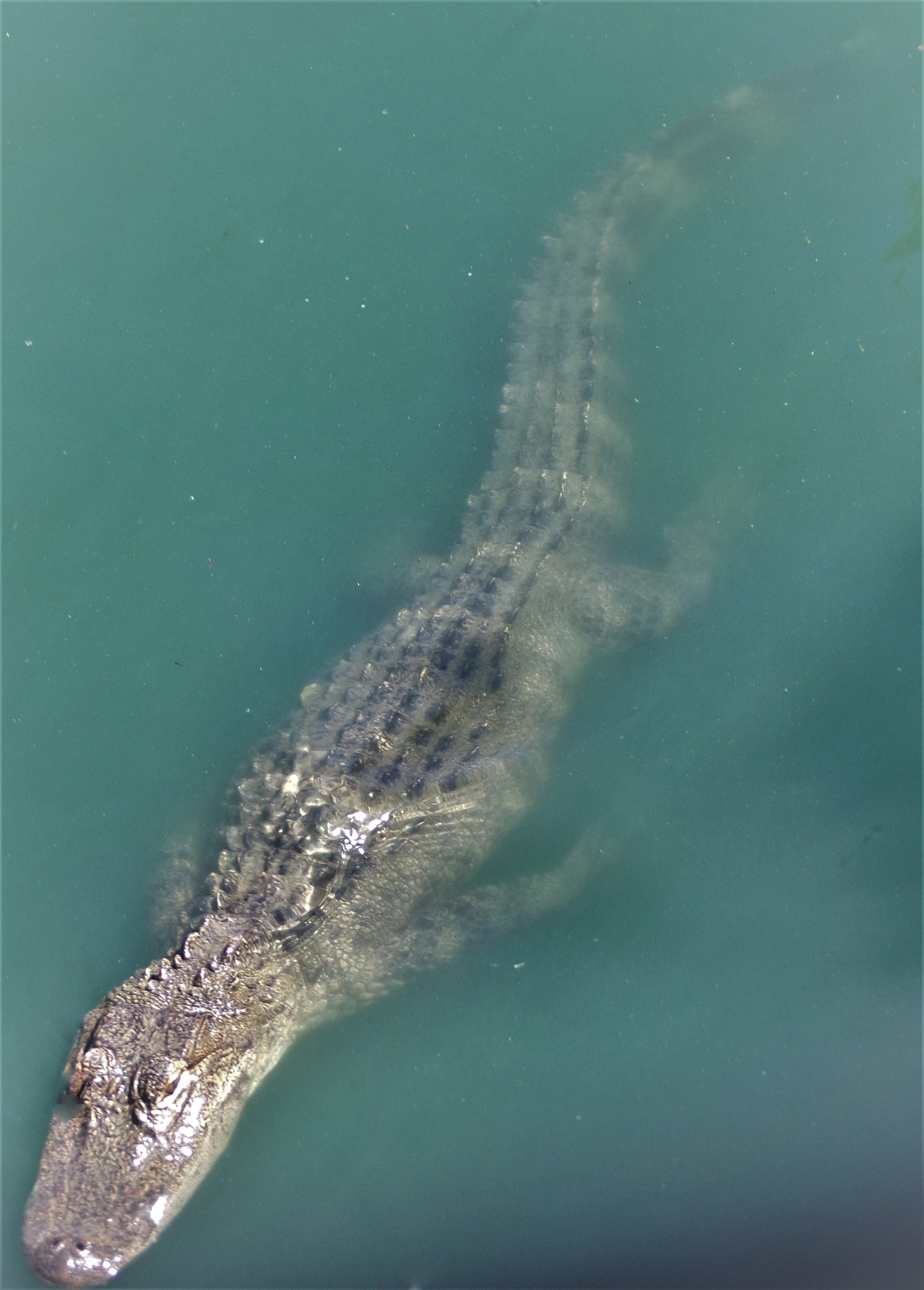
An American alligator swimming in an enclosure at a zoo

=== Attacks on humans ===
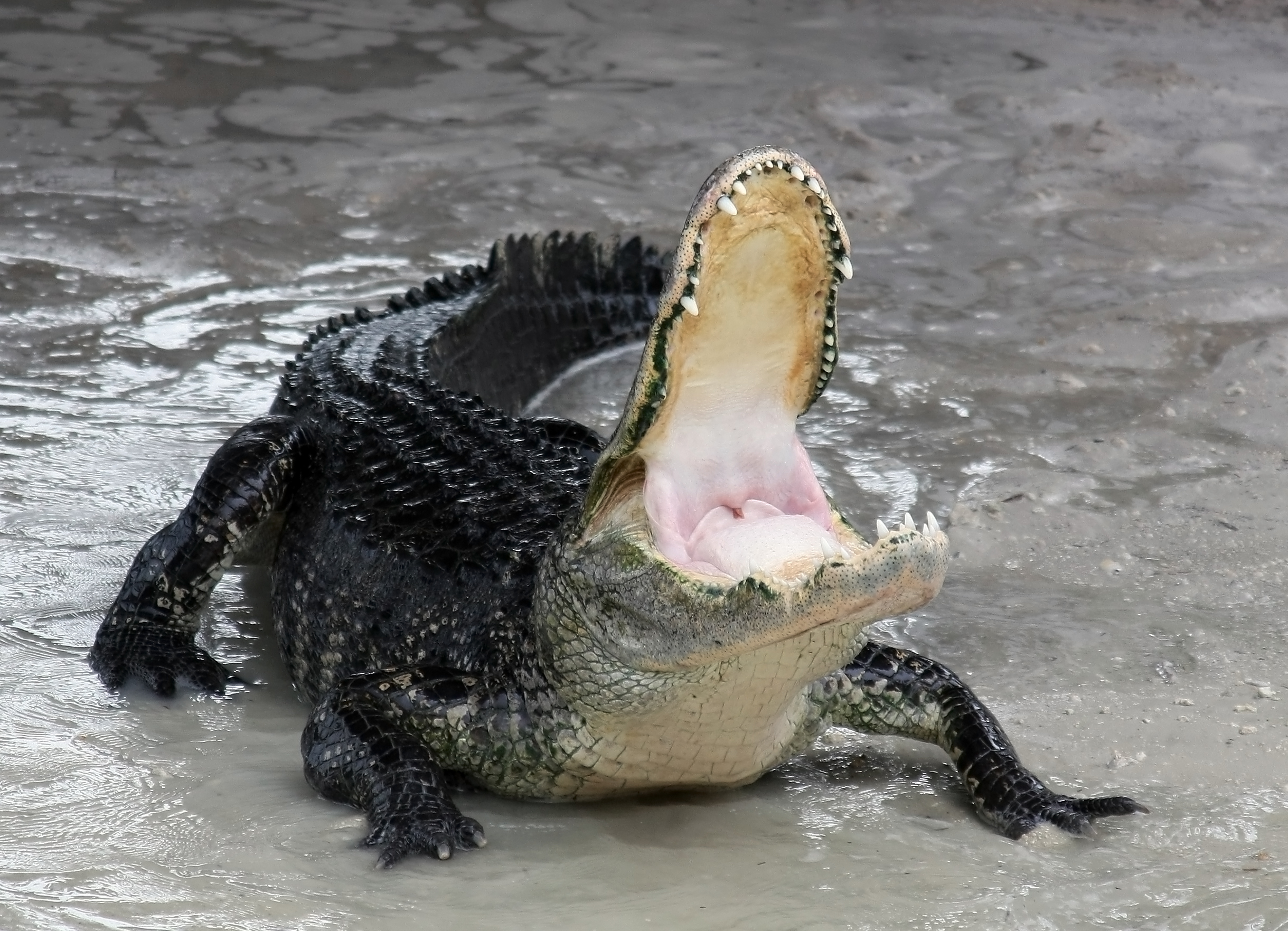
Defensive American alligator with mouth open

American alligators are capable of killing humans, but fatal attacks are rare. Mistaken identity leading to an attack is always possible, especially in or near cloudy waters. American alligators are often less aggressive towards humans than some crocodile species, which are larger and of which some species (mainly the Nile and saltwater crocodiles) may prey on humans with some regularity. Alligator bites are serious injuries, due to the reptile's sheer bite force and risk of infection. Even with medical treatment, an American alligator bite may still result in a fatal infection.

As human populations increase, and as they build houses in low-lying areas, or fish or hunt near water, incidents are inevitable where humans intrude on American alligators and their habitats. Since 1948, 257 documented attacks on humans in Florida (about five incidents per year) have been reported, of which an estimated 23 resulted in death. Only nine fatal attacks occurred in the United States throughout the 1970s–1990s, but American alligators killed 12 people between 2001 and 2007. An additional report of alligator attacks showed a total of 376 injuries and 15 deaths recorded all from 1948 to 2004, leading this to an increase of the alligator population. In May 2006, American alligators killed three Floridians in less than a week. At least 28 fatal attacks by American alligators have occurred in the United States since 1970.

=== Wrestling ===
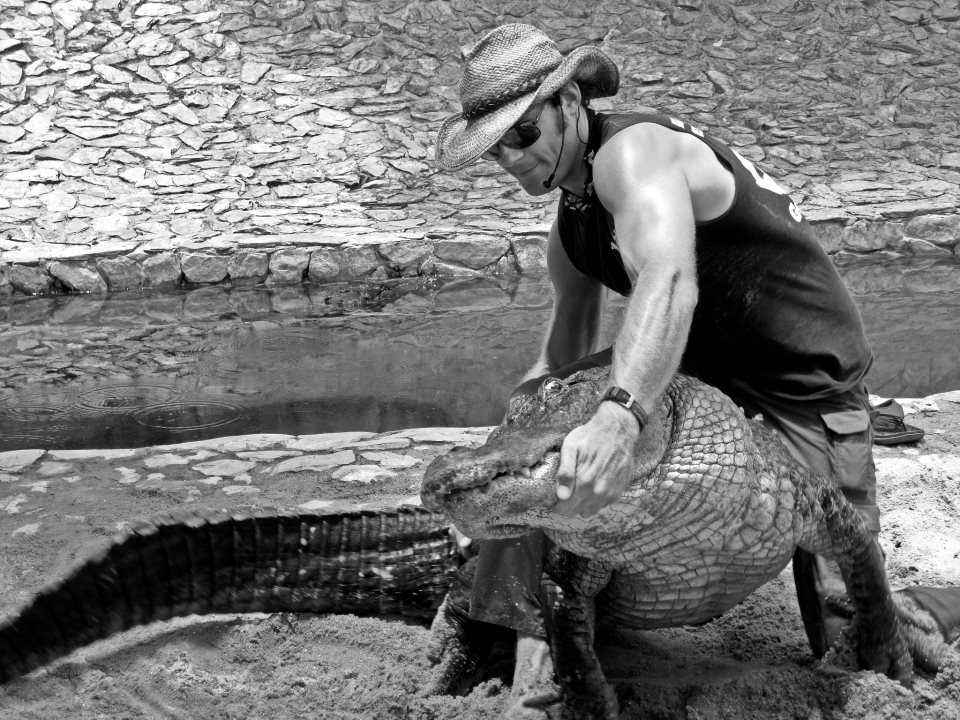
Man wrestling American alligator

Since the late 1880s, alligator wrestling has been a source of entertainment for some. Created by the Miccosukee and Seminole tribes for food prior to its popularity for tourism, this tourism tradition remains popular despite criticism from animal-rights activists.

=== Farming ===
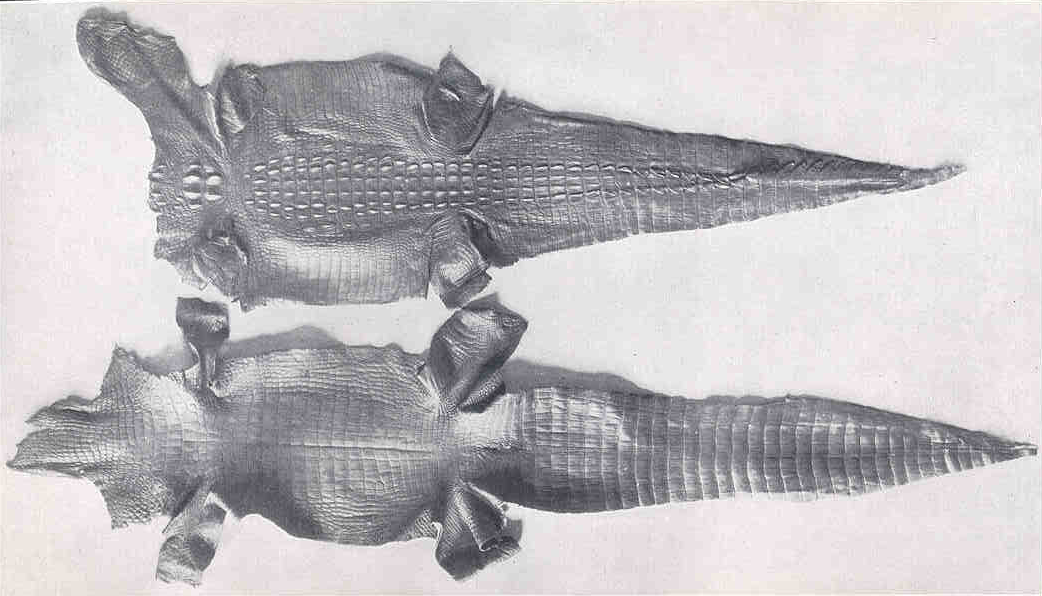
American alligator skins

Alligator farming is a large, growing industry in Georgia, Florida, Texas, and Louisiana. These states produce a combined annual total of some 45,000 alligator hides. Alligator hides bring good prices, and hides in the 6–7 feet (1.8–2.1 m) range have sold for $300 each. The market for alligator meat is growing, and about 300,000 pounds (140,000 kg) of meat are produced annually. According to the Florida Department of Agriculture and Consumer Services, raw alligator meat contains 232 calories (0.97 kJ) per 3.2 ounces (91 g) portion, of which 38 calories (0.16 kJ) come from fat.

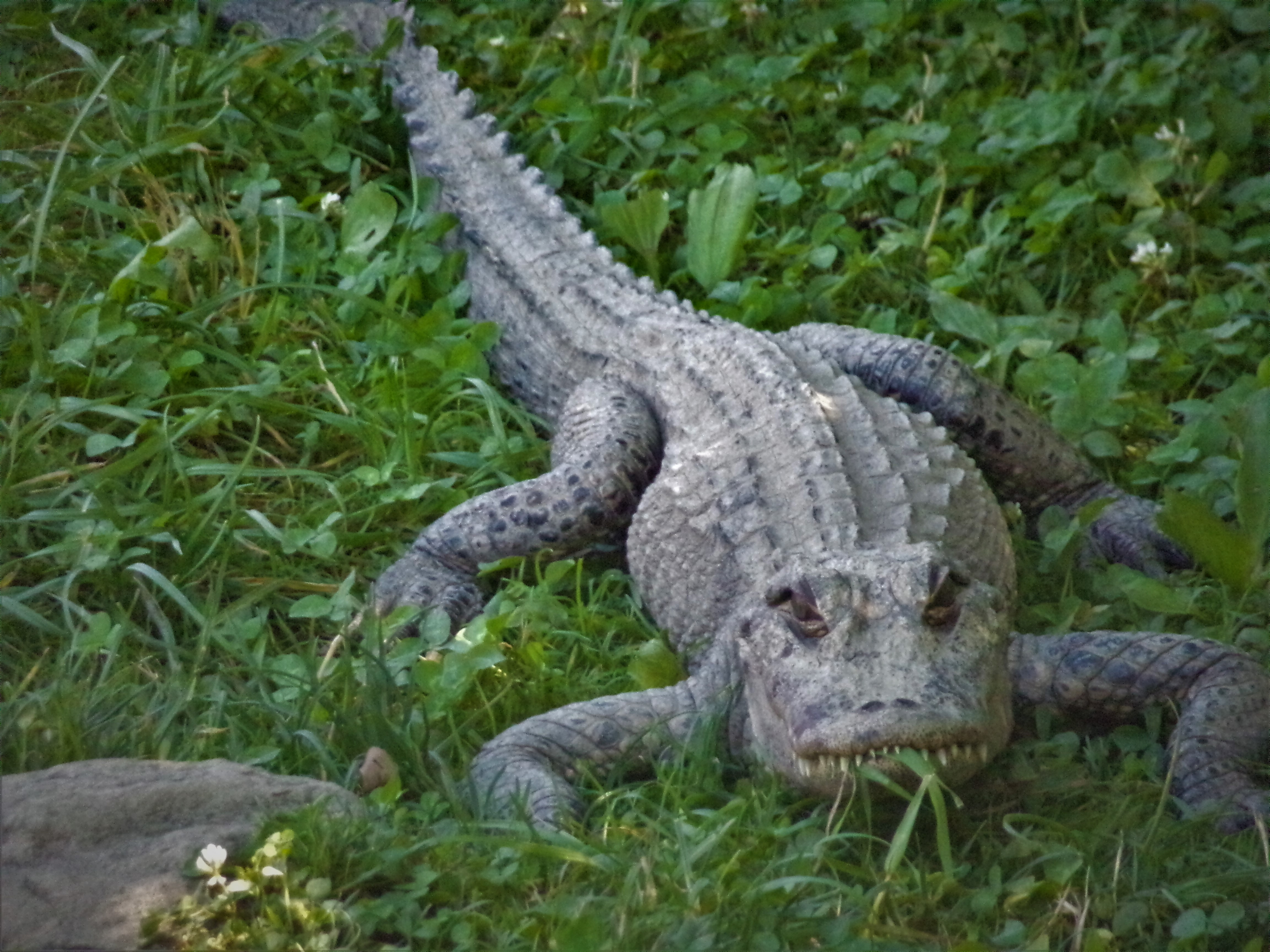
An American alligator sunning itself on the grass at a zoo

== Culture ==
The American alligator is the official state reptile of Florida, Louisiana, and Mississippi.

"Gators" has been the nickname of the University of Florida's sports teams since 1911. In 1908, a printer made a spur-of-the-moment decision to print an alligator emblem on a shipment of the school's football pennants. The mascot stuck, and was made official in 1911, perhaps because the team captain's nickname was Gator. Allegheny College and San Francisco State University both have Gators as their mascots, as well.

The Gator Bowl is a college football game held in Jacksonville annually since 1946, with Gator Bowl Stadium hosting the event until the 1993 edition. The Gatornationals is a NHRA drag race held at the Gainesville Raceway in Gainesville since 1970.

== See also ==
- Chinese alligator, the other living species of alligator
- Muja, the oldest living American alligator in captivity, lived in Belgrade Zoo, Serbia
- Saturn, an American alligator that survived the destruction of the Berlin Zoological Garden during World War II
- The Alligator People
- Gatorland
- Brazos Bend State Park
- Sewer alligator
- American Crocodile
