= Lake Pithlachocco Canoe Site =

- U.S. National Register of Historic Places
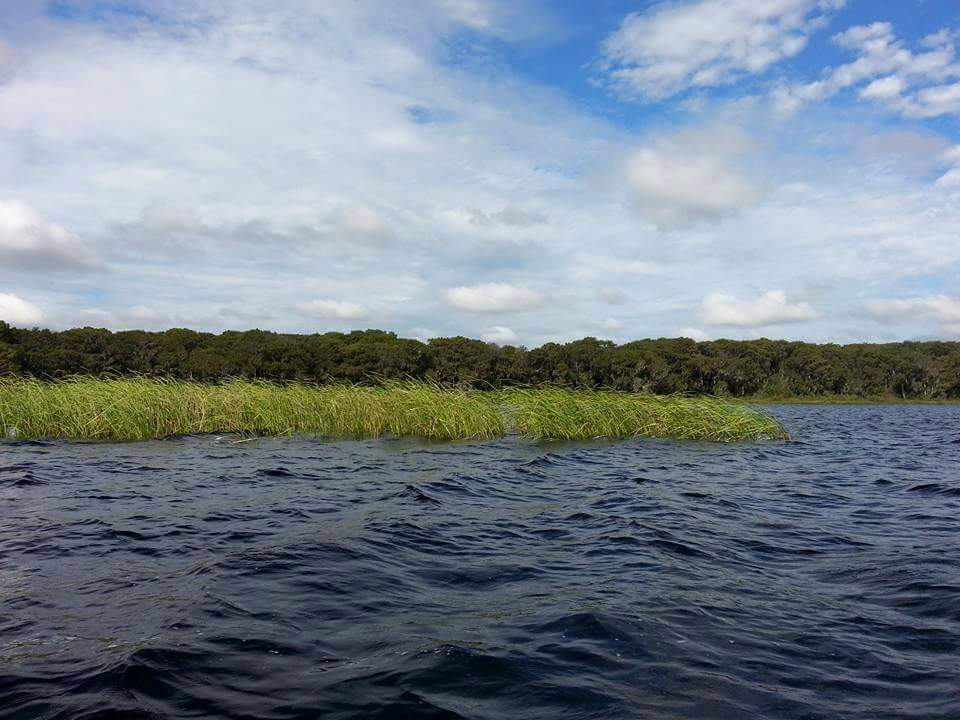

- Location within Florida
- Location: Alachua County, Florida, USA
- Nearest city: Gainesville, Florida
- Coordinates: 29°40′38″N 82°12′55″W
- NRHP reference No.: 01000303
- Added to NRHP: March 27, 2001

The Lake Pithlachocco Canoe Site (also known as Newnan's Lake Canoe Site) is a historic site east of Gainesville, Florida. It is located on the northeast shore of Newnans Lake, off State Road 26. On March 27, 2001, it was added to the U.S. National Register of Historic Places. The site is within Newnans Lake Conservation Area.

A drought in the first half of 2000 significantly lowered the water level of Newnans Lake, exposing a large number of dugout canoes and plank-built skiffs. Surveys eventually identified the remains of more than 100 dugout canoes on the exposed lake bottom. Most of the canoes were found along the northeast shore of the lake, but a few, fragmentary canoes, were identified along the southwestern shore. Additional canoes were discovered under canoes that were excavated for study. The Florida Bureau of Archaeological Research initially excavated 53 of the canoes for further study in June and July 2000. Low water in May 2001 revealed another two canoes that were added to the study. Each canoe was measured and photographed, and samples were taken to be submitted for radiocarbon dating and for identification of the species of trees from which the canoes were formed.

All of the canoes had been crafted using fire to hollow out logs. Most of the canoes dated from the Archaic period (more than 2,300 years ago). Thirteen canoes were more recent, with radiocarbon dates ranging from 500 Before Present (BP) to 1300 BP. Samples from 41 canoes yielded radiocarbon dates from 5000 to 2300 BP, corresponding to the Middle Archaic and early Late Archaic periods. Most of the Archaic period canoes were fragmentary; only five canoes were judged to be at least 75% intact, and seven were less than 50% intact. The canoe ends tended to be better preserved, which was attributed to the wood being thicker there, with more of the heartwood present. The wood in all of the canoes was badly deteriorated, and had become soft and spongy. None of the canoes were deemed suitable for removal and preservation. Wheeler et al. judged the locations of the canoes to have been random, likely caused by natural forces such as prevailing winds.

All of the canoes were made from logs hollowed by fire. Some of the canoes also showed evidence of fire being used to form the sides and ends of the canoes. While no tool marks were found on the canoes, the indigenous peoples of Florida are known at the time of first European contact to have used fire and scraping tools to shape canoes. Wheeler et al. judged most of the Archaic period canoes to be of Type 2 in the classification developed by Newsom and Purdy. (Note: Newsom and Purdy defined six types of dugout canoes found in Florida. They describe their Type 1 as the crudest, with much charred wood left in the interior and with bark sometimes left on the exterior. Type 2 canoes are distinguished from Type 1 by a more finished interior and by having both ends "bevelled slightly upward" and smoother. Type 3 canoes are similar to Type 2, but with a platform extending up and out from the bow. As Type 3 canoes have been found near coasts and larger interior bodies of water, they may have been intended for use in rough water. Type 4 canoes were fashioned with iron tools, and so date from after European contact. Type 5 canoes had been modified to use as hulls in catamarans or had been widened by cutting them down the middle and lashing in planks. Type 6 canoes are a distinct style made by the Seminoles.) Nineteen of the canoes, all dated to between 2310 BP and 4160 BP, had one or more thwarts, a ridge of wood transversing the interior. The purpose of the thwarts is unclear. All of the Archaic period canoes had been made from conifers. Most had been fashioned from yellow pines. One canoe had been made from a Bald cypress log.

The Archaic period canoes found in Newnans Lake could not be distinguished from canoes of the Post-Archaic period (after 1000 B.C.) that have been found in Florida. Similar canoes of the Archaic period have been found elsewhere in Florida, indicating that a peninsula-wide tradition of canoe manufacture had existed since 5000 BP. Archaic period canoes are rare in the eastern United States outside of Florida. Sea levels rose rapidly around 7,000 years ago, raising the water table in the Florida peninsula and creating new wetland habitats. The wide-spread use of canoes in Florida is likely related to the development of new cultures that exploited those wetlands.

== Sources ==
- Wheeler, Ryan J.; Miller, James J.; McGee, Ray M.; Ruhl, Donna; Swann, Brenda; Memory, Melissa (July 2003). "Archaic Period Canoes from Newnans Lake, Florida". American Antiquity. 68: 533–551. JSTOR 3557107.
- Newsom, Lee Ann; Purdy, Barbara A. (September 1990). "Florida Canoes: a Maritime Heritage from the Past". The Florida Anthropologist. pp. 164– – via University of Florida Digital Collections.
