= Newnans Lake =

Lake in the state of Florida, United States

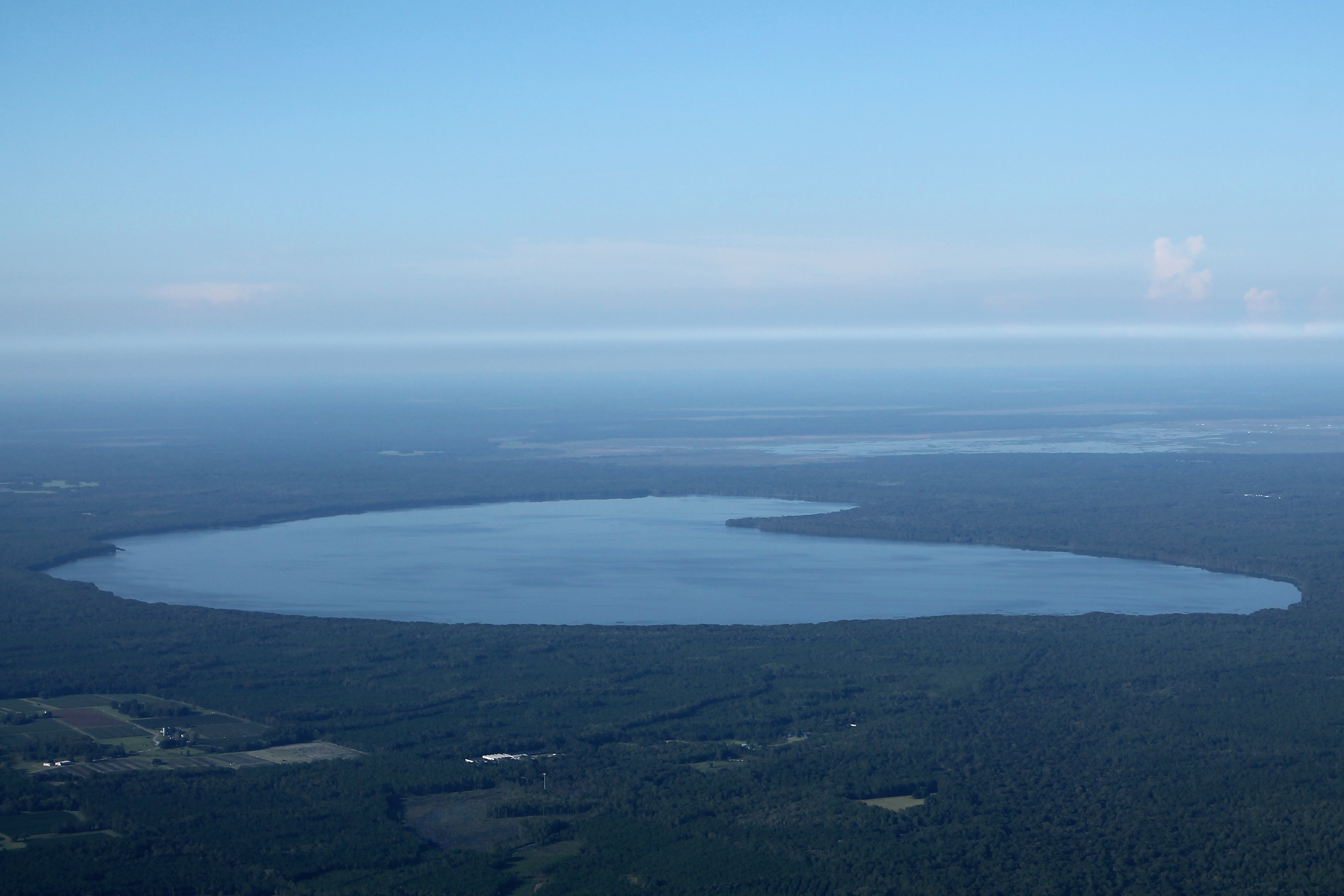
- Aerial view of Newnan's Lake

- Location within Florida Location within the United States
- Location: Gainesville, Florida
- Coordinates: 29°39′02″N 82°13′06″W
- Type: eutrophic
- Primary outflows: Prairie Creek
- Catchment area: 308 km^{2} (119 mi^{2})
- Basin countries: United States
- Surface area: 3,042 ha (7,520 acres)
- Average depth: 1.5 m (4.9 ft)
- Max. depth: 3.6 m (12 ft)
- Water volume: 58×10^{6} m^{3} (2.0×10^{9} cu ft)
- Residence time: 0.6 years
- Surface elevation: 66 ft (20 m)

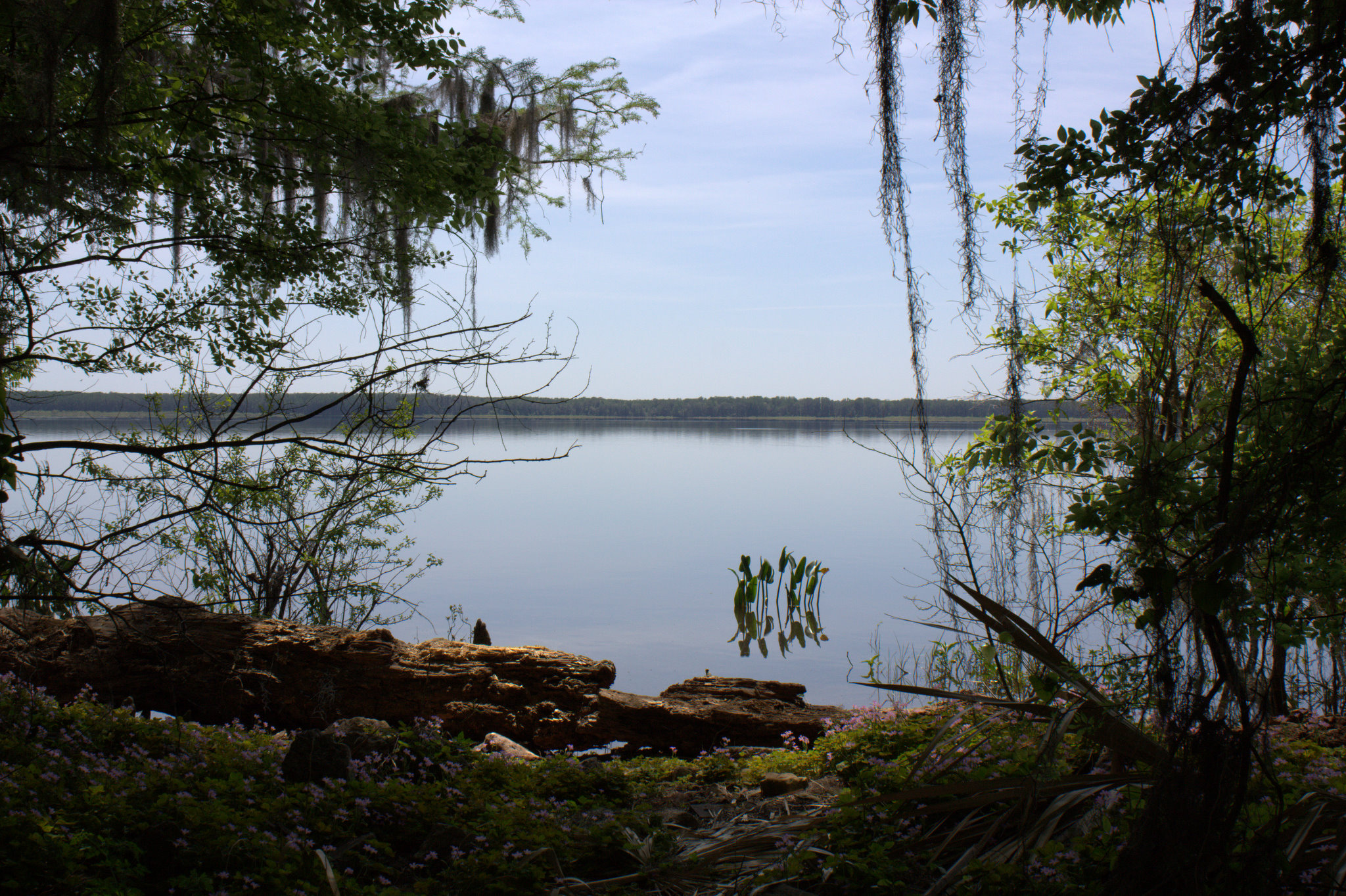
View of Newnan's Lake

Newnans Lake (or Newnan's Lake) is a lake located off State Road 20, east of Gainesville, Florida. Approximately 1.12 miles (2 km) wide, Newnans Lake is home to wildlife and has been designated as a protected site by Alachua County. Newnans Lake State Forest is on the west side of the lake and there is a Newnans Lake Conservation Area. The Lake Pithlachocco Canoe Site where dugout canoes were found is listed on the National Register of Historic Places.

== History ==
The lake was originally known as Lake Pithlachocco. It was renamed after Daniel Newnan, who led a detachment of Georgia militia that fought an inconclusive battle with Seminoles near the lake in 1812.

Prairie Creek, the principal outlet of Newnans Lake, originally drained into Paynes Prairie. The Camp family, which owned Paynes Prairie and operated a cattle ranch on it, wanted to drain the prairie to improve it as pasture. After very heavy rain flooded the Prairie in 1927, the Camps commenced projects to lower the water table on the Prairie that included diverting Prairie Creek to the River Styx, which flows into Orange Lake.

In the Spring and Summer of 2000, a drought revealed canoe remnants. Fifty-five of the canoes were analyzed through radiocarbon assays, which showed 41 of them to date to between 2300 and 5000 B.C. The wood choice and manufacturing techniques were comparable to other Archaic Period canoes. The discovery led to the site's addition to the National Register of Historic Places in March 2001.

== Hydrology ==
Newnans Lake is located 8 kilometres (5.0 miles) east of Gainesville. It averages 1.5 metres (4.9 ft) deep, and has a maximum depth of 3.6 metres (12 ft). It has an area of approximately 3,000 hectares (7,400 acres). Surface flow into the lake is primarily from the north, via Hatchett Creek, Little Hatchett Creek, and other streams. The lake's drainage basin has an area of 308 square kilometres (119 mi^{2}). The primary outlet is Prairie Creek on the south side of the lake.

A spillway was installed in 1967 to control the water level of the lake. It is classified as eutrophic. Before the spillway was installed, the water level of the lake fluctuated seasonally. The margins of the lake are dominated by Cypress swamp forests. Forty-four archaeological sites have been identified on the shores of the lake, or at nearby ponds and marshes. The lake has been designated a Fish Management Area by the Florida Fish and Wildlife Conservation Commission and the Alachua County Board of County Commissioners.

== State forest ==
The 1,005-acre (407 ha) Newnans Lake State Forest is located to the west of the lake in Alachua County, Florida. It includes pine flatwoods borders the 6,000-acre Newnans Lake. It has trails for hiking and biking. There is a $2 admission fee. In 2026, a hunting event called Operation Outdoor Freedom was held at Newnans Lake State Forest from April 10 to 12.

The establishment of the state forst was announced in 2005.

== See also ==
- Florida state forests

== Newnans Lake Conservation Area ==
The Newnans Lake Conservation Area owned by the St. Johns River Water Management District is primarily along the north end of the lake.

== See also ==
- Lake Pithlachocco Canoe Site
