= McIlhenny =

McIlhenny or McElhenny is an Irish surname commonly found in Donegal and Derry. They are a Sept of the Cenel Eogain race, son of Niall high king of Ireland. In Gaelic the name translates "servant of Saint Canice". Notable people with the surname include:

- Alexander McIlhenny (1778–1835), American military officer, farmer, and diarist
- Bernice McIlhenny Wintersteen (1903–1986), American art collector, president of the Philadelphia Museum of Art (1964–1968)
- Don McIlhenny (1934–2023), American football player
- Edmund McIlhenny (1815–1890), American businessman and inventor of Tabasco sauce
- Edward Avery McIlhenny (1872–1949), American businessman and Arctic explorer
- Henry Plumer McIlhenny (1910–1986), American art collector
- John Avery McIlhenny (1867–1942), American businessman, Rough Rider, and politician
- Paul C. P. McIlhenny (1944–2013), American businessman and conservationist
- Walter Stauffer McIlhenny (1910–1985), American businessman and World War II Marine

== McElhenny ==
- Hugh McElhenny (1928–2022), American football player
- Marcus McElhenney (born 1981), American attorney, Olympic rowing coxswain
- Rob McElhenny (born 1977), American actor and writer best known for It's Always Sunny in Philadelphia

== McElheny ==
- Josiah McElheny (born 1966), American artist
- Victor McElheny (1935–2025), American science writer

== See also ==
- McElhenney
- McElhinney
