= Marsh Island Wildlife Refuge =

Protected area in Louisiana, United States

- Marsh Island WMA
- IUCN category V (protected landscape/seascape)
- Location within Louisiana
- Location: Iberia Parish, Louisiana
- Coordinates: 29°33′59″N 91°50′46″W
- Area: 76,664 acres (310.25 km^{2})
- Established: 1960 (initial)
- Governing body: Louisiana Department of Wildlife and Fisheries

Marsh Island Refuge is located on Marsh Island, Iberia Parish, south coastal Louisiana. The island is uninhabited and managed by the Louisiana Department of Wildlife and Fisheries (LDWF) as a wildlife sanctuary.

== History ==
Edward McIlhenny and wealthy birdwatcher/conservationist Charles Willis Ward reached out to Russell Sage's widow, Margaret Olivia Slocum Sage, and through the Russell Sage Foundation she purchased the then 76,664 acres (31,025 ha) Marsh Island and turned it over to the LDWF in 1960.

== Location ==
The island sits south of Cypremort Point State Park and north of the Gulf of Mexico. Vermilion Bay is to the northwest and Cote Blanche Bay to the northeast. Bayou Sale Bay is to the east with Burns Point Park at the end of LA-317. State Wildlife Refuge is to the west.

== Island details ==
Marsh Island is 20 miles (32 km) east to west and 11 miles (18 km) north to south. The island has many named and unnamed lakes and bayous such as Lake Hawkins, Hawkins Bayou, Lake Tom, Worm Bayou, Lake Blanc, Scat Lake, Lake Michael, Gordy Lake, Lake Sand, Oyster Lake, Oyster Branch, West Oyster Branch, and East Oyster Branch on the east side of the island. There is also South Point, Mound Point. More to the central part is Bird Island Bayou and Joe Aucoin Bayou. South of these two is a restricted area. On the western side is Lake Ferme, Long Lake, Lucien Lake, Lake Jefferson, Bayou Lucien, Bayou Platte, with a restricted area south of this, Big Charles Bayou, Little Charles Bayou, and Bayou Chene. On the western side is Lighthouse Point. There is a restricted area on the southwest side between Lighthouse Point and Oyster Lake. In the middle of this is Grosse Isle Point and Cheniere La Croix.
