= Southwest Pass =

Southwest Pass may refer to:

- Southwest Pass (Mississippi River), a channel at the mouth of the Mississippi River in Louisiana in the United States.
- Southwest Pass (Vermilion Parish), a narrow strait connecting the Gulf of Mexico with Vermilion Bay in Louisiana in the United States.
