= McElhiney =

McElhiney is a surname. Notable people with the surname include:

- Ashley McElhiney (born 1981), American women's basketball player and coach
- Bill McElhiney (1915–2002), American musical arranger and trumpeter
- Thomas McElhiney (1919–1998), American diplomat

== See also ==
- McElhinney
