= Edmund McIlhenny =

American businessman (1815–1890)

- Born: 1815; Hagerstown, Maryland, U.S.
- Died: November 25, 1890 (aged 74–75); Avery Island, Louisiana, U.S.
- Occupations: Businessman; entrepreneur; farmer
- Years active: 1868–1890
- Known for: Founder of and chief executive of company McIlhenny, Manufacturer of Tabasco sauce
- Spouse: Mary Eliza Avery
- Family: John Avery McIlhenny (son); Edward Avery McIlhenny (son)

Edmund McIlhenny (/ˈmækəlhɛni/; 1815 – 25 November 1890) was an American businessman and manufacturer who founded the McIlhenny Company, which was the first to mass produce Tabasco sauce. While company legend attributes the invention of the sauce to McIlhenny, plantation owner Maunsel White is said by some to have been the first to cultivate and make a sauce from tabasco peppers in the United States, and gave the recipe and pepper pods to his friend McIlhenny.

== Biography ==
Born in Hagerstown, Maryland, in 1815, Edmund McIlhenny moved to New Orleans, Louisiana, around 1840, finding work in the Louisiana banking industry. He was of Irish and Scottish descent. He had acquired a small fortune and became an independent bank owner.

On June 30, 1859, he married Mary Eliza Avery. They had eight children.

During the Civil War, McIlhenny fled with his in-laws, the Avery family, to Texas, where he served as a civilian employee of the Confederate army, first as a clerk in a commissary office, then as a financial agent for the paymaster.

The South's economic collapse after its defeat ruined McIlhenny, who now lived with his in-laws in their plantation house on Avery Island, Louisiana. It was there that McIlhenny tended the family garden, where, according to tradition, he grew a variety of fruits and vegetables.

== Tabasco sauce ==
According to one legend, McIlhenny was given tabasco peppers and a recipe for tabasco sauce by a friend, plantation owner Maunsel White, who died in 1863 – though company legend says McIlhenny himself invented the sauce between 1866 and 1868. In 1868, he grew his first commercial pepper crop, selling the first bottles of his product the following year, which he called Tabasco brand pepper sauce.

In 1870, McIlhenny obtained letters patent for the sauce, which he packaged in cork-top two-ounce bottles with diamond logo labels very similar in appearance to those in present-day use.

At first McIlhenny sold the product mainly along the Gulf Coast in places including New Orleans, New Iberia, Louisiana, and Galveston, Texas. By the early 1870s, however, he had broken into larger markets, such as New York City, Philadelphia, and Boston, helped by major nineteenth century food manufacturer and distributor E. C. Hazard and Company.

== Death and legacy ==
McIlhenny died in 1890, and apparently did not consider his production of Tabasco sauce to have been a particularly notable accomplishment. Indeed, he made no mention of Tabasco sauce in an autobiographical sketch composed toward the end of his life, nor was it mentioned in his obituaries.

Regardless, his successors, sons John Avery McIlhenny and Edward Avery McIlhenny, realized that their father had created a foundation on which they could build a larger family business, and they shortly expanded and modernized the manufacturing process. Today each carton of Tabasco sauce bears a facsimile of McIlhenny's signature.

== See also ==
- Edward Avery McIlhenny
- John Avery McIlhenny
- Walter Stauffer McIlhenny
- Hugh McElhenny
- Tabasco sauce
