= Thomas Q. Seabrooke =

American actor and comedian

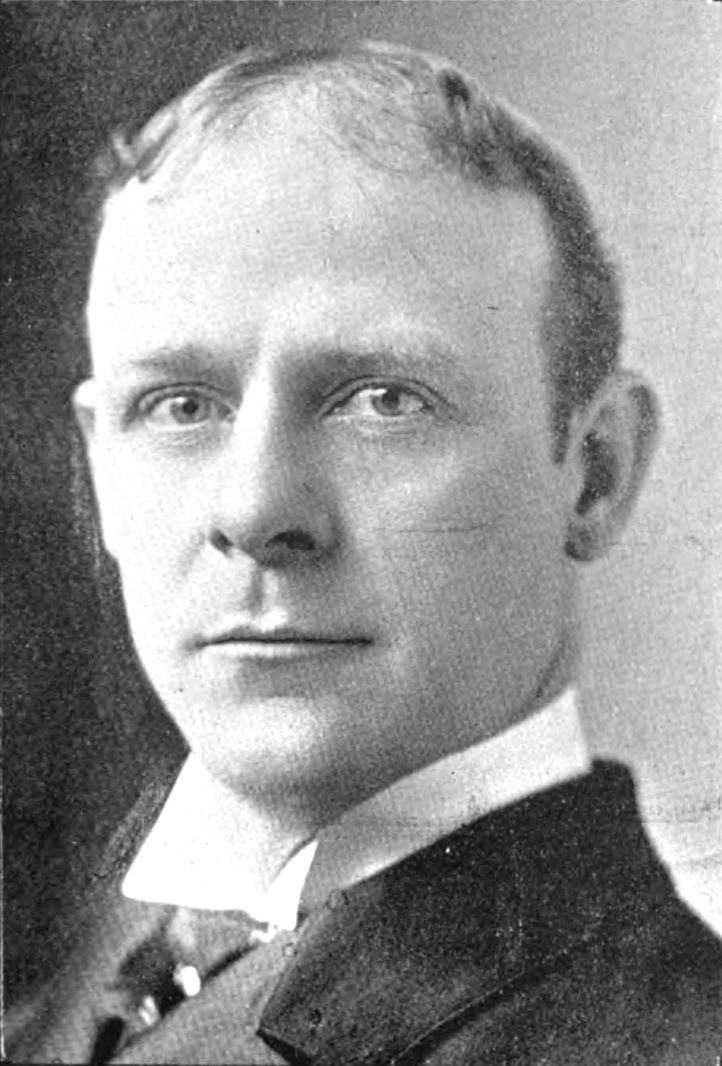

Thomas Q. Seabrooke (October 20, 1860 – April 3, 1913) was an American actor, comedian, vaudeville performer, and impresario who achieved fame as the star of several comic operas and musicals.

== Life and career ==
Thomas Q. Seabrooke was born on October 20, 1860, in Mount Vernon, New York. His birth name was Thomas Quigley. He was educated in the Mount Vernon City School District until the age of eleven when he was apprenticed to the East Chester National Bank. Shortly before his twentieth birthday, he made his professional stage debut as Bertie Cecil in Cigarette; a stage adaptation of the novel Under Two Flags by playwright Henry F. Stone.

Seabrooke became a leading actor in numerous comic operas and musicals which were staged on Broadway and toured nationally from the 1880s through the first decade of the 20th century. The most successful of these were The Isle of Champagne (1894),Tabasco (1895), and A Chinese Honeymoon (1902).

At the age of 53, Seabrooke died from pneumonia on April 3, 1913, in Chicago.
