= E. C. Hazard and Company =

19th century American grocery importer

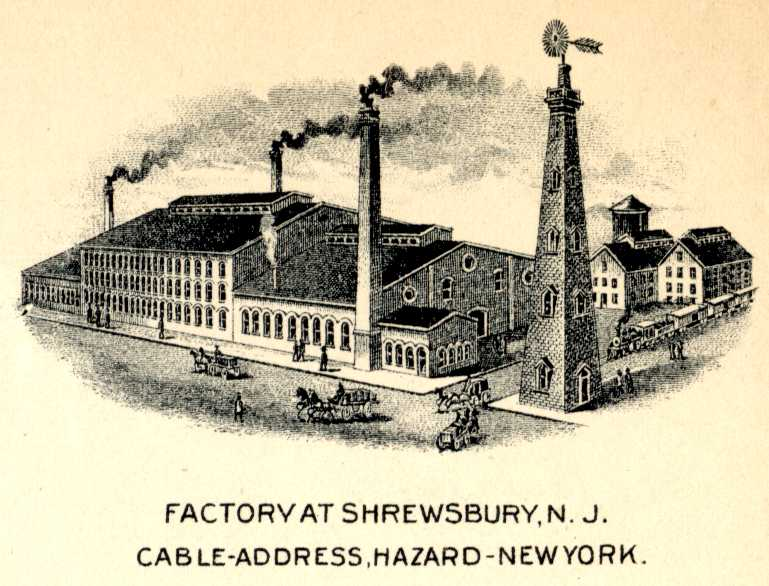
E. C. Hazard and Company's facilities at Shrewsbury, New Jersey, c. 1890.

E. C. Hazard and Company was a major grocery importer, manufacturer and distributor in 19th-century and early 20th-century America. In particular, E.C. Hazard and Company has been credited with pioneering the U.S. domestic manufacture and distribution of "fancy groceries" — a term that referred to processed canned, jarred and bottled food products (now commonly found throughout modern-day groceries and supermarkets).

== The founder ==
The firm was founded in 1850 by Edward Clarke Hazard, born April 4, 1831, at Mumford's Mills near Peacedale, Rhode Island; he died February 2, 1905, at his home "Shrewsbury Manor" in Shrewsbury, New Jersey. Hazard attended public schools in Narragansett, Rhode Island, and at age 18 went to New York City to enter a trade. There, "with horse and wagon, he became engaged at vending soap and fancy goods with B. T. Babbitt," particularly imported grocery items. In 1850 he opened his own grocery firm, which he called E. C. Hazard and Company. Frank Green was his original partner.

He lived in Greenwich Village, first at 22 Grove Street, and then 36 Grove St in 1858 just before or after his second marriage, to Emily (Emma) Howe, the daughter of Stewart D.Howe, a Patent Medicine manufacturer and his wife, Robetta. Edward and Emma had two sons, Edward Howe Hazard (born 1861) and Charles Hazard (born 1863). Emma died on May 12, 1880, age 42, and Hazard married for the third time on November 23, 1880, to Florence (Frances) Adaline Frothingham. She was born July 4, 1863, in Charlestown, Massachusetts.

Hazard had eight children with Florence, 5 sons and 3 daughters. The children were: Elmer Clarke Hazard, Bowdoin Frothingham Hazard, Florence Elsworth Hazard, Elizabeth Robinson Hazard, Frank Green Hazard, Helen Franklin Hazard and Arnold Watson Hazard. Eldest daughter Florence married Austrian Prince Francis von Auersperg on June 14, 1899, and thereafter was known as "Princess von Auersperg." They divorced in January 1915 after the Prince demanded that she place her fortune from her father in his name. She married New York businessman John Joseph Murphy of New York in May 1915. Murphy was the son of New York State Senator Edward Murphy Jr.; Elizabeth married Harry Lord Powers, son of a NY builder, banker, politician, and NY Parks Commissioner (1884–1888) on June 26, 1908. Helen married Alfred Nash Beadleston, forty years her senior, who was senior partner of Beadleston & Woerz Brewery (Empire Beer) in 1909. After his death 12 years later, she married Julian McCarty Little of Newport, RI. Elmer, who married Pearl White of Philadelphia, was a doctor in Long Branch, New Jersey, and founded Hazard Hospital in Long Branch, New Jersey.

Label from a bottle of E. C. Hazard and Company's Shrewsbury Brand Tomatoketchup, c. 1890. Note the spelling "Tomatoketchup" (one word).

== The company ==
First located at No. 69 Barclay Street and then at 192, 194, 196 and 198 Chambers St. — and from 1886 at the new Mercantile Exchange at Hudson and Harrison with his warehouses at Hudson and North Moore Streets and his bottle vault at 74 Grove St. in Manhattan — E. C. Hazard and Company opened a large factory in 1883 at Shrewsbury, NJ, the latter of which also became the adopted home of the Hazard family.

It was in Shrewsbury, NJ that Hazard and Company purchased a 165-acre (0.67 km^{2}) tract on which it built "extensive factories, including handsome offices and one of the best-equipped laboratories in this country." The firm also grew much of its own agricultural produce on this Shrewsbury tract.

Among the consumer goods produced by E. C. Hazard and Company at its Shrewsbury, NJ facilities were Hazard's Shrewsbury Brand "Tomatoketchup" (one word), canned tomatoes (which the firm sometimes called by the archaic name "Love Apples"), canned baked beans and mushrooms, as well as white asparagus, okra, peppers, tarragon, jellies, salad dressings, and various sauces. The earliest well-known product it distributed, however, was made by another manufacturer: McIlhenny Company's Tabasco brand pepper sauce, which Hazard and Company helped to introduce nationally beginning in the early 1870s.

Hazard had a devotion to purity of his products and is credited with marketing the first pure and unadulterated ketchup. He was founder, president and presiding officer of the Pure Food Manufactures Association at Madison Square Garden in 1892.

At its peak, Hazard and Company was said to have generated annual revenues in the range of $7 to $9 million. In 1907, however — two years after E. C. Hazard's death — the company suffered in the credit panic. By the end of the year, it was forced into bankruptcy by his widow, Florence A. Hazard, to wrest control from the former partners and two of her children. Eventually the firm went out of business entirely.

Hazard's son-in-law, Harry Lord Powers of New York, and his wife Elizabeth Robinson Hazard, bought Shrewsbury Manor, the forty-bedroom manor in 1911, and the factory and more land in 1913. Hazard's widow and Powers fought in court for many years over whether Powers had bought just the factory, and not the recipes and business.
