= Marsh Island (Louisiana) =

- Uninhabited Area
- Location of Marsh Island in Louisiana Marsh Island (the United States)
- Coordinates: 29°33′59″N 91°50′46″W
- Country: United States
- State: Louisiana
- Parish: Iberia

Area
  - Land: 99 sq mi (260 km^{2})
- Elevation: 1 ft (0.30 m)

Population (2000)
  - Total: 0
  - Density: 0.0/sq mi (0.0/km^{2})
- Time zone: UTC-6 (CST)
  - Summer (DST): UTC-5 (CDT)
- Area code: 337

Marsh Island (French: Grosse-Île-du-Vermillion) is an island off the coast of southern Louisiana in the United States. There is no residential population at the time of the 2000 census.

The entire island is a wildlife sanctuary managed by the Louisiana Department of Wildlife and Fisheries (LDWF) as the Marsh Island Wildlife Refuge.

== Overview ==
Marsh Island is an uninhabited low-lying marshy island in Iberia Parish, south coastal Louisiana, lying between Vermilion Bay and the Gulf of Mexico. It is bordered on the south by the Gulf of Mexico and is separated from mainland Louisiana by East Cote Blanche Bay to its east, West Cote Blanche Bay to its north, Vermilion Bay to its northwest, and Southwest Pass to its west.

Vegetation is primarily of the marshy types, and the island is almost treeless. On the island is the Marsh Island Wildlife Refuge, a wild bird sanctuary for species such as the snow goose. Other animals which inhabit the island include alligators, ducks and other waterfowl, crabs, and shrimp. The island is popular for recreational fishing.

The island has a land area of 258.95 square kilometers (99.98 sq mi) and had zero residents as of the 2000 census.

== Island features ==
The island has many named features that includes areas, bayous, and lakes. On the eastside of the island is South Point

=== Lighthouse ===
There was a lighthouse on the west side of the island overlooking Southwest Pass, Vermilion Bay, Louisiana on Lighthouse Point, at 29°34'37.3"N 92°01'52.6"W listed as the Vermillion Bay Lighthouse from March 3, 1837, until June 1, 1855.
