= Dr. Holbrook's Military School =

School in Briarcliff Manor, New York (1864–1915)

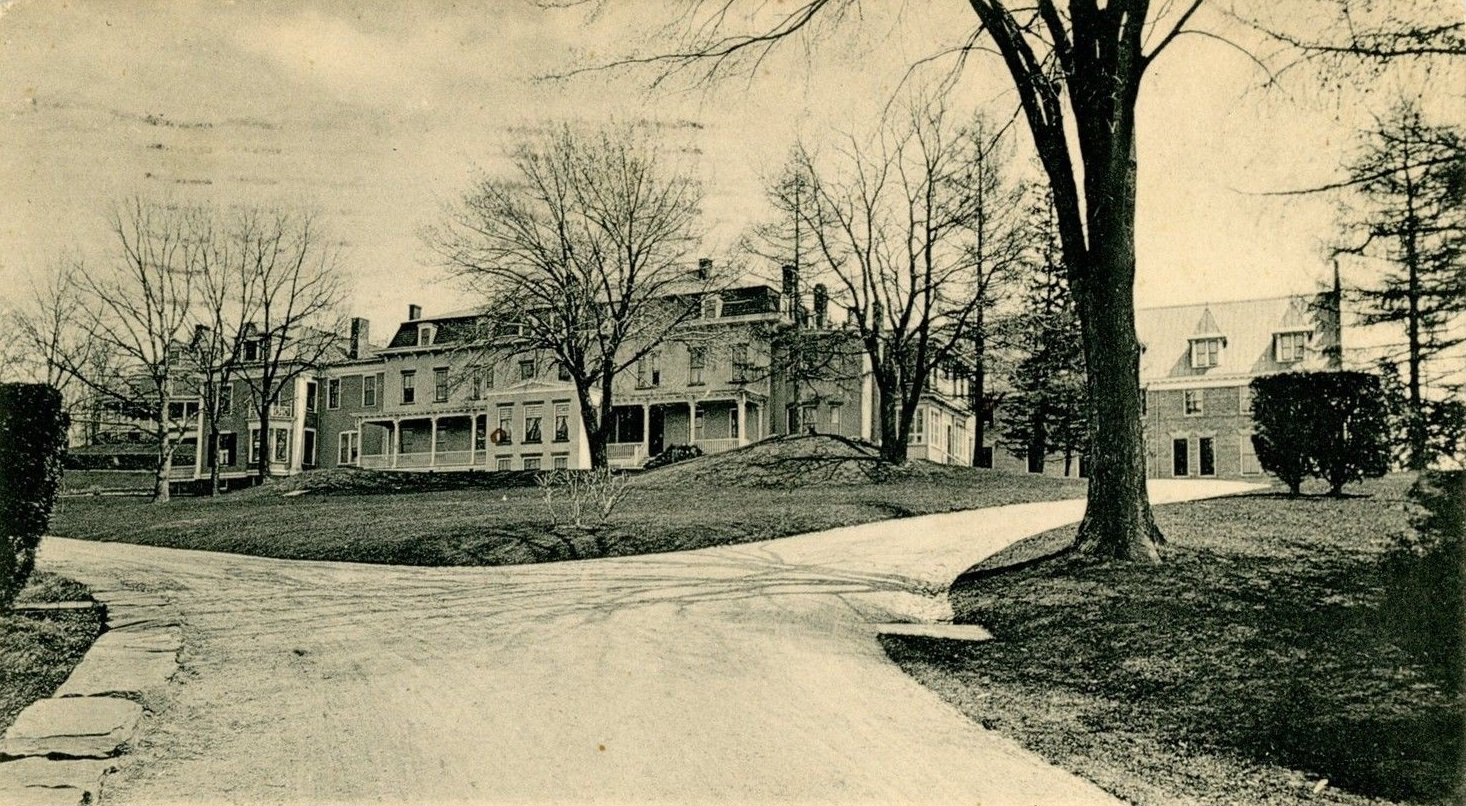
- Dr. Holbrook's Military School, c. 1900
- Former names: Mr. Tracy's School, Saint Denis Institute
- Type: Private
- Active: 1864–1915
- Location: Briarcliff Manor, New York
- Campus: 25 acres (10 ha)
- 41.1529°N 73.8502°W

Dr. Holbrook's Military School (Note: Other names include Holbrook's Military High School, Holbrook Military Academy, Holbrook's Preparatory School for Boys, and Briar Cliff or Briarcliff Military Academy.) was a military academy and boarding school for boys. The school was located in the town of Ossining and overlooked the Hudson River. After the 1906 annexation of Scarborough by the village of Briarcliff Manor, Holbrook's became part of the village within Ossining.

The school was founded in 1864 as Mr. Tracy's School. In 1866, after David A. Holbrook purchased the school, it became known as Dr. Holbrook's Military School. The school ran until 1915, after which it was used in World War I as a field hospital and headquarters to a New York Guard regiment. From 1919 until at least 1927, the school served as the Teachers College Country Club.

== History ==
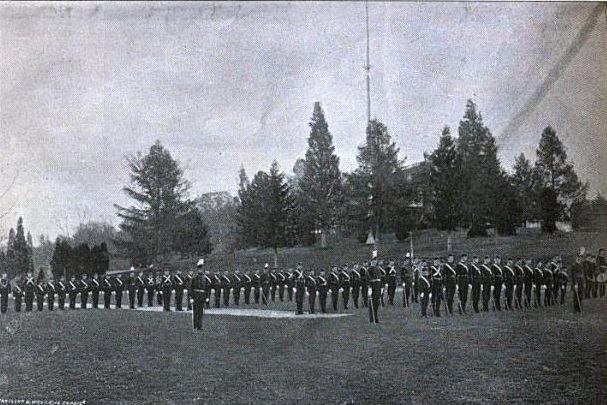
Students at the school, c. 1888

And so the end of October found the regiment in comfortable
quarters, more secure than ever before, its lines weakened by
the ravages of influenza and its hospitals crowded to capacity,
but fighting unhampered and with hope. On the big football
field on the flat to the east of the headquarters buildings the
pigskin thumped merrily after work hours, and in the early
mornings the Headquarters Company and patients found plenty
of room for their callisthenics. Baths, lights, steam-heat, and such
comforts as the men who had served with the regiment from its
first days had never dreamed of, made life worth while.

— T. R. Hutton, page 135

Saint Denis Institute was said to have occupied the land prior to the school. It was founded in 1864 as Mr. Tracy's School, a seminary for young women on a 10-acre (4.0 ha) estate. In 1866, Reverend David A. Holbrook, PhD, purchased the school, turned it into a boys' school, and enlarged it to 25 acres (10 ha). It had 60 students.

After Holbrook's death in December 1898, Dr. Holbrook's sons Dudley and Henry became involved with running the school. They were joined in 1899 by their brother Dwight, and ran the school until its closure as Holbrook's Preparatory School for Boys. When it closed in 1915 the school had 80 students.

Shortly after the school's closure, in 1917, events in World War I led the New York Guard's First Provisional Regiment (1,500 men operating under Colonel John B. Rose) to guard the Croton Aqueduct. Captain Charles W. Baldwin, Chaplain of the regiment and Rector of Saint Mary's Episcopal Church in Scarborough and also in present-day Briarcliff Manor, arranged a deal with V. Everit Macy, then the owner of the school estate, for free use of the campus and buildings until three months after the war's end.

The regiment, originally headquartered at Pines Bridge Inn on Croton Lake, moved its headquarters to the Holbrook Military Academy, and the academic building at the school became Field Hospital No. 2 of the Atlantic Division of the American Red Cross. The ground floor of the west wing and the mess hall on the first floor was turned into a large, well-heated office with glass-partitioned private offices, and equipped with typewriters and mimeograph machines. The new regimental office had strong contrast with their Pines Bridge Inn office, it having been drafty, dirt-floored and poorly-lit. The site opened for their use on October 8, 1918, and the regiment fully demobilized on February 1, 1919. A reunion was held at the former school grounds for many of the troops from March 23 to 25, 1919.

In June 1919, V. Everit Macy gave the property, buildings, and $7,500 for remodeling to the Teachers College Country Club; Macy was chairman of the college's board of trustees at the time. The club was founded on October 4, 1919, and initially used a building called Hill Cottage, which it outgrew shortly thereafter. The club opened there on September 1, 1919, and existed there until at least 1927. Presidents included Henry C. Pearson (1919–21), Jesse C. Williams (1921–23), Walter H. Eddy (1923–25), and Edward S. Evanden (1925). Walter W. Law gave the club's members (which numbered 200 in 1920) the right to use Briarcliff Manor's 9-hole golf course, the present-day Trump National Golf Club.

== Curricula ==
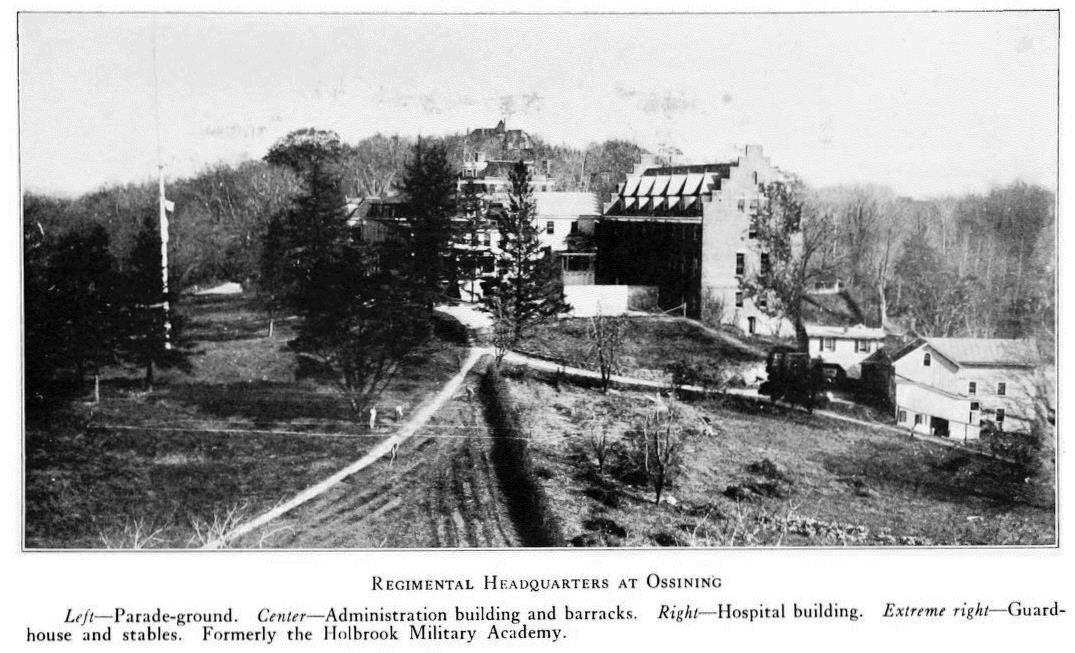
The school as the First Provisional Regiment headquarters

In 1903 the school consisted of six forms, the first two making up the lower school and the remaining four making up the upper school; in the upper school students chose from three curricula: classical, Latin-scientific, or English-scientific. Students received grades for deportment, application, spelling, declamation and composition, church attendance, and skill at military drill, as well as in classes where they learned arithmetic, algebra, French, Latin, German, and Greek. Sports included baseball, football, tennis, hockey, track, athletics, and golf. The school issued a merit roll every four weeks, where students were ranked on conduct, lessons and attendance.

== Notable people ==
George Whipple, a physician and pathologist, was a teacher at the school for a year before he started work at Johns Hopkins University. Composer and organist Fannie Morris Spencer was also a teacher. Notable students include Donn Barber, an architect, Nelson Doubleday, a publisher, Edward Avery McIlhenny, a businessman, explorer, and conservationist, John Avery McIlhenny, a businessman, soldier, politician, and public servant, Harold Medina, a lawyer, teacher and judge, and John W. Norton, a muralist and easel artist.

== See also ==
- Briarcliff Manor, New York
