= Tabasco (burlesque opera) =

American stage musical comedy

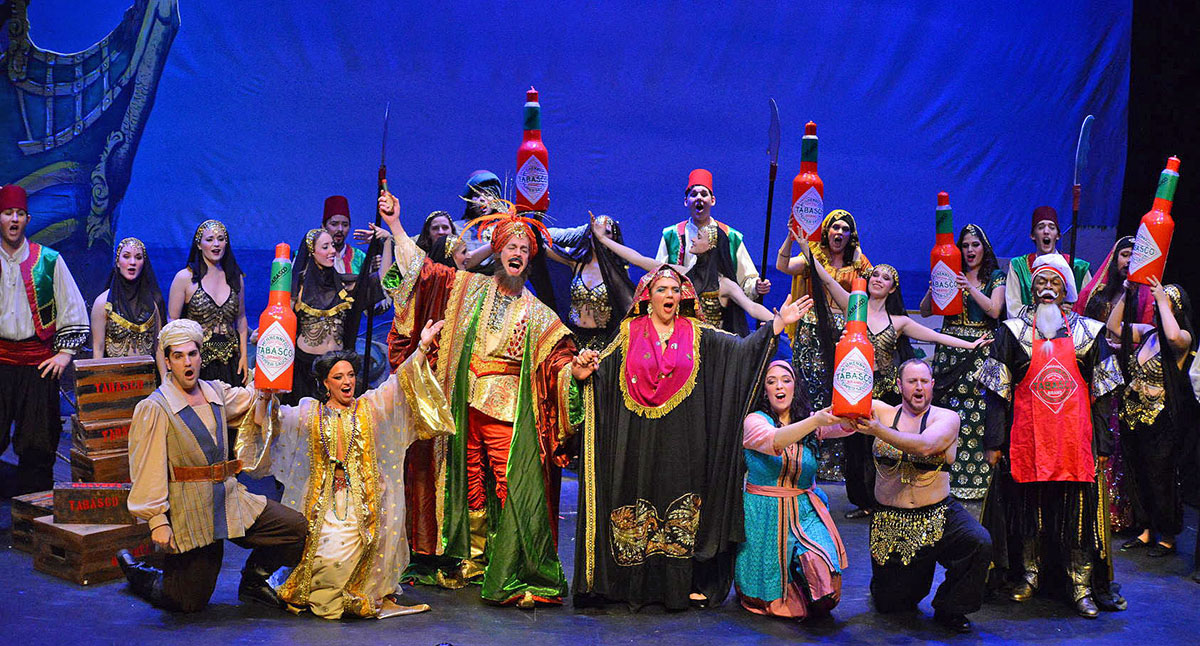
Photo of the cast of the 2018 revival of Tabasco, first performed in 1894.

Tabasco is a "burlesque opera in two acts" with music by George W. Chadwick and a libretto by R. A. Barnet. The work is written in a blend of styles including operetta, musical theatre, Victorian burlesque, and vaudeville. The opera was created without the knowledge of McIlhenny Company, maker of Tabasco brand pepper sauce since 1868. The company, however, subsequently approved its performance. The opera went on to tour the U.S. to critical acclaim, but disagreements between Chadwick and the opera's producer eventually derailed its success.

The complete original libretto and score for Tabasco were thought lost, with only partial material surviving from an incomplete 1894 published piano score. However, in 2012 a complete libretto was found and the conductor Paul Mauffray used this libretto and surviving music to reconstruct a performable version of the work. This reconstructed version was staged by the New Orleans Opera in 2018 under the title Burlesque Opera of Tabasco; a title also used by the B. F. Wood Music Company in sheet music excerpts from the opera. However, the original Boston premiere and the premiere of the Seabrooke production (including its longest tour stop on Broadway), were staged under the name Tabasco and the original published 1894 piano score also used that title.

== Roles ==
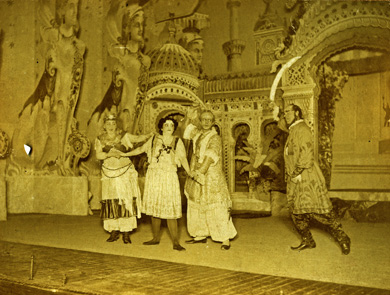
A scene from Tabasco, 1894.

Roles, role type, premiere cast
| Role | Voice type or part type | Professional premiere cast, Seabrooke production, 6 April 1894 same cast for Broadway premiere on 23 June 1894 Conductor: Ludwig Engländer |
|---|---|---|
| Hot-Head-Ham-Pasha, the Bey of Tangiers | low comedy role | Walter Allen |
| Dennis O'Grady, a.k.a. François, the Bey's chef | comic tenor | Thomas Q. Seabrooke |
| Fatima, newest addition to the harem | soprano | Catherine Linyard |
| Marco, Spanish captain of a trading vessel | baritone | Joseph F. Sheehan |
| Ben-Hidden, Grand Vizier | baritone | Otis Harlan |
| Lola, Marco's sister | soubrette | Elvia Crox |
| Hasbeena, a third term harem favorite | mezzo-soprano | Lillie Alliston |
| General Mohammad | comedy role | G. Bardini |
| Lieutenant-General Mohammed | comedy role | Arthur Concors |
| Major-General Mohammed | comedy role | H. C. Davis |
| Exhausted Hawkins | comedy role | Robert E. Bell |

== Synopsis ==
Setting: Tangier, Morocco, late 1800s

=== Act 1 ===
Recently arrived in Morocco, sea traders Marco and Lola hawk their wares in the busy port of Tangier. The brother and sister both comment on their hopes of finding a little romance while in this exotic country and recount the morning’s trades, including a small bottle of red hot sauce acquired by Lola. A fanfare announces the arrival of the Pasha “Hot-Hedem” AKA “The Sultan of Spicy” AKA “The Bey of Tangier”. Before the Pasha makes his grand entrance, Marco and Lola meet the Pasha’s right-hand man, The Grand Vizier (a blood-thirsty executioner who longs for the bygone days of daily beheadings and nightly hangings) and Hasbeena (once the crown jewel of the Pasha’s harem, now a third-string concubine). Both unhappy with their current lot, the Vizier and Hasbeena plot to overthrow the Pasha. In order to keep the Pasha unaware of their scheming, they must keep him happy, and that means finding him a new French chef who can appease the Pasha’s love of spicy foods. Enter Dennis O’Grady, an Irishman who recently arrived in Morocco. Although he is neither French nor a chef, he is drafted to be the Pasha’s new cook.

The Pasha enters with much celebration and he immediately expounds upon his love of spicy foods and for all things hot. A postman arrives with a letter from the Bey of Morocco. The fellow despot will be gifting a new harem girl to Hot-Hedem. The other ladies in the harem are not excited about this news. It is time for lunch and Dennis (now called François) enters with a small army of sous chefs. The Pasha takes one bite and declares that if François cannot prepare a dish spicy enough to appease his tastes by dinner, he will be beheaded.

Fatima, the new harem girl arrives. Marco, who had seen Fatima in passing earlier, is smitten by her beauty. Marco and Lola help Fatima escape her guards. In order to prevent an alarm before they can flee the port, they must replace her with someone. Enter Dennis/ François, three sheets to the wind on Irish whiskey. The substitute harem girl has arrived. Marco suggests they club him over the head and dress him in Fatima’s veil and clothes. Lola protests because she has fallen for the handsome Irishman. Marco persuades her to agree by explaining they can put the small bottle of hot sauce in François’ pocket. When he awakes, he’ll have the answer to his culinary problems and everyone will come out a winner. No clubbing is necessary as François passes out drunk. He is dressed in Fatima’s clothes and Marco and Lola dress as guards to deliver the unconscious “Fatima” (François) to the Pasha. Fatima follows behind at a distance.

In the Pasha’s seraglio François is presented as Fatima and Marco and Lola have a difficult time making their exit. Eventually, all is revealed to the Pasha. Just before Marco is executed, Fatima steps in and begs for his life, saying that Marco is her cousin and Lola is her sister. Taken by her beauty and sincerity, the Pasha stays the sentence. However, François is still in hot water as it is now dinner time and he has failed to produce a satisfyingly spicy meal. Lola runs to his aid with the small bottle of sauce. A few drops are applied to the Pasha’s dinner, he tastes it, and he proclaims it is the best thing he has ever put in his mouth. Reading the label on the bottle, he declares François the Peer of Tabasco!

=== Act 2 ===
The Bey’s Palace in Tangier
Fatima strategically avoids the Pasha’s advances and is allowed to see her “cousin” Marco. Marco and Fatima sing a love duet. Lola and François (now dressed as The Peer of Tabasco) enter. There is a new problem—the Pasha is consuming Tabasco so quickly that the bottle will be gone within a few meals. François must find more or face dire consequences. The quartet of lovers dream of escaping to exotic lands like Spain, Ireland, France, and ... Kentucky???

The Pasha has arranged for a huge celebration of Tabasco and will be bringing in special dancing girls from Marrakesh. Lola, François, Marco, and Fatima plan to escape on the boat carrying the dancers from Marrakesh. Hasbeena and the other girls of the harem lament over their current situation. The Vizer reveals his plan to assassinate the Pasha to Hasbeena, who is having second thoughts. The Vizer has placed a bomb in the box that is to house the many bottles of Tabasco François has promised for the celebration later that night. Thus, when the Pasha will open the box—BOOM!

In order to abduct Fatima, François and Marco disguise themselves as dancing girls from Marrakesh and sneak into the festivities. With the explosive box in hand, the Pasha sings an original song he has composed extolling the virtues of Tabasco. Before Marco, François, and Fatima can escape, the girls from Marrakesh are called to the floor and Marco and François must do their best to keep up. By the end of the dance, the jig is up and Marco and François are revealed. Marco makes an escape, but François is caught. Just before Hot-Hedem opens the box of supposed Tabasco, Hasbeena intervenes and prevents him from setting off the bomb. For her reward, the Pasha pardons Hasbeena, but François and the Vizier are sentenced to immediate death.

Marco and Lola arrive with a boat laden with crates of Tabasco; it had been docked in the port of Tangier the whole time. In his delight, the Pasha agrees to pardon François, Lola, and Marco. Marco asks for Fatima’s release and, in exchange, offers to sail to the land of Louisiana to bring back all the Tabasco the Pasha could desire. The Pasha agrees and they all (except the Vizier) rejoice.

== List of movements ==
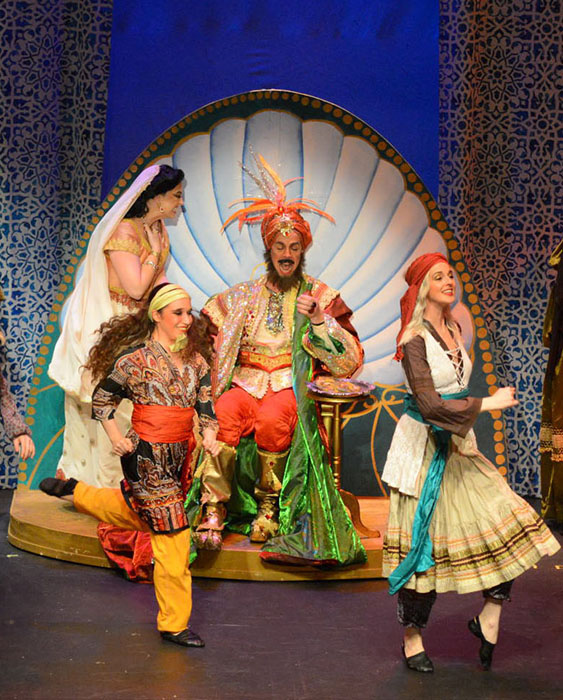
The Pasha sings, from the opera's 2018 revival.

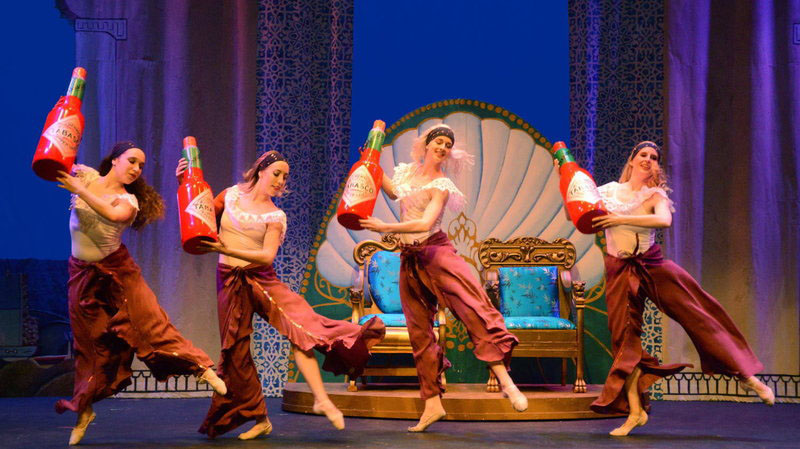
Dance of the harem, from the opera's 2018 revival.

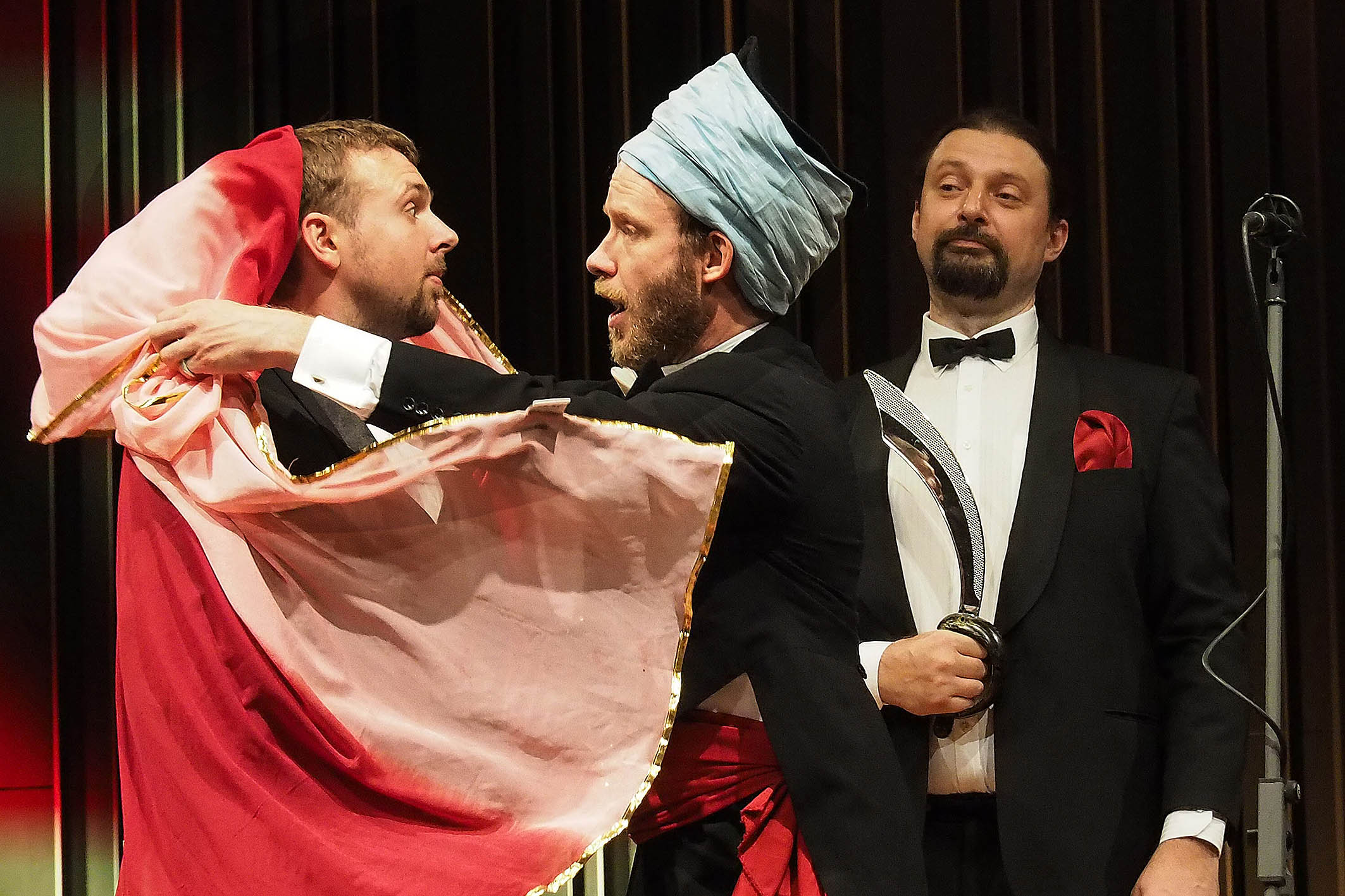
Wolfgang Mirlach and Adam Leftwich in the Czech premiere of the opera, 2015

=== Act I ===
Overture

1. Chorus (A) "Dawning, the dawning, the Shadows westward fall"
2. Grand Vizier's song (c) "I'm Vizier here, I'm always in mishap"
3. Pasha's song and chorus (G) "I do not care what other people say"
4. Chorus (B flat) "Reading of the mail"
5. Song and chorus (François and cooks) (F) "Tin tan, tin tan, patty pan"
6. Fatima's song (F) "O lovely home"
7. "Gem of the Orient" Pasha, Fatima, Lola, Marco, and chorus (A flat, E, c, G)
8. François' Lament (E flat) "The shamrock blooms white on the lakes of Killarney"
9. Finale (B flat F G) "Hail to his highness the Peer of Tabasco"

=== Act II ===
Interlude (G)

1. Chorus (B flat) "A beauty my boy you are, you are"
2. Hasbeena and Harem (E flat) "Hush, hush follow me"
3. Love Duet, Fatima, and Marco (E flat) "My heart again to hope begins"
4. Loves of the World:
  1. 4a. Quartette à la Bolero (Spanish) (D) "In Barcelona lived a maid" (Marco)
  2. 4b. Irish Ditty (C) "Ah now thin be aisy for love is a daisy" (François)
  3. 4c. French Rigaudon & Razzle Dazzle (F) "He met his love at the students' ball" (Lola)
  4. 4d. Plantation Ballad (A) "O darkies don't yer 'member de old Kentucky farm"
  5. 4e. Melodrama (c, E flat)
5. Solo (Marco) and chorus (D) "Ho mariner ho"
6. Song and Chorus (Hasbeena and Grand Vizier) (March: c; Song A flat) "Greet the old man with a smile"
7. Pasha's song (d) "An original idea"
8. March of the Pasha's Guard (E flat)
9. Dance of the Harem (E flat)
10. Finale (G, C, F) "Ev'rybody is coming"

== Performance history ==
A Boston volunteer militia, the First Corps of Cadets, commissioned Chadwick and Barnet to create Tabasco as a fundraiser for a new armory. It was the third work Chadwick had created for the group, and Tabasco contained portions of the earlier Chadwick opera The Peer and the Pauper (1893). The cadets themselves performed the opera for this charitable purpose. These productions were particularly popular among the Boston public; largely due to the comedy in seeing the male cadets perform not only the male characters but the female ones. The opera premiered on January 29, 1894 at the Tremont Theatre, Boston where it ran for just five performances.

While Chadwick and Barnet created Tabasco for an amateur group, they also had aspirations for selling the work to professional theatrical producers. They were successful in this ambition, and immediately following the Tremont Theatre premiere they sold the performance rights to the work to Boston-based producer Edward E. Rice. Rice, in turn sold the performance rights of the work to actor Thomas Q. Seabrooke who was impressed by the opera's popularity among Boston audiences and intended to make himself the star of a professional staging. At the time of this latter sale, Seabrooke contracted with Chadwick and Barnet to make several alterations; which according to Chadwick meant "Seabrooke's part had to be fattened at all costs."

Because Seabrooke intended to perform the opera commercially, he required, and obtained, the permission of McIlhenny Company to use its proprietary trademark. As part of its approval, however, McIlhenny Company required Seabrooke to pass out samples of Tabasco sauce during his productions. A giant papier-mâché Tabasco sauce bottle appeared on stage during the performance, and an image of the bottle showed up on the opera's published sheet music. So popular was Seabrooke's commercial production of the opera that “The Tabasco March,” the main theme composed by Chadwick, was issued in the form of a mechanical music box disk.

Seabrooke's altered version of the work premiered under the original title Tabasco in Norwich, Connecticut on April 6, 1894. This production then toured to New London, Connecticut before returning to Boston where it ran at the Boston Museum. The touring production reached Broadway on May 18, 1894, still under the original title Tabasco. The New York City run at the Broadway Theatre ended on June 23, 1894 after 48 performances.

=== 1894–1895 tour ===
George Whitefield Chadwick's Burlesque Opera Tabasco was performed in 1894 in the following cities:

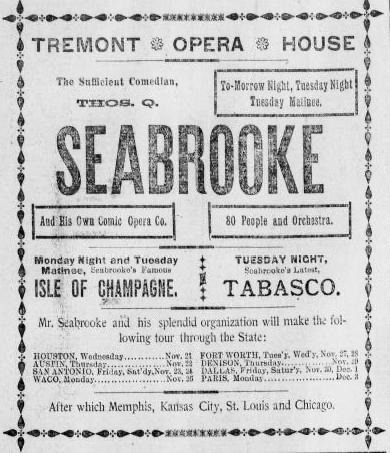
Tabasco tour of Texas, announcement in Galveston Daily News, November 18, 1894

- Boston, MA
- New York, NY
- Providence, RI (Sept. 10–12)
- Worcester, MA
- Springfield, MA
- Northampton, MA
- Portland, ME
- Portsmouth, NH
- Lawrence, MA
- Manchester, NH
- New Britain, CT
- Bridgeport, CT
- Washington Township, NJ
- Trenton, NJ
- Chester, PA
- Pittsburgh, PA
- Wheeling, WV
- Washington, D.C.(Sept. 23–29)
- Wilmington, DL (Oct. 3)
- Zanesville, OH
- Columbus, OH
- Paris, KY
- Lexington, KY
- Louisville, KY
- Columbia, TN
- Fayetteville, TN
- Chattanooga, TN
- Atlanta, GA
- Augusta, GA
- Charleston, SC
- Savannah, GA
- Macon, GA
- Columbus, GA
- Selma, AL
- Montgomery, AL
- Birmingham, AL
- Meridian, MS
- Vicksburg, MS
- Natchez, MS
- New Orleans, LA
- Galveston, TX (Nov. 20)
- Houston, TX (Nov. 21)
- Austin, TX (Nov. 22)
- San Antonio, TX (Nov. 23–24)
- Waco, TX (Nov. 25)
- Fort Worth, TX (Nov. 27–28)
- Denison, TX (No. 29)
- Dallas, TX (Nov. 30 and Dec. 1)
- Paris, TX (Dec. 3)
- Fort Smith, AR
- Little Rock, AR
- Memphis, TN
- Kansas City, MO
- St. Louis, MO
- Chicago, IL

In an attempt to avoid paying royalties to Barnet and Chadwick, Seabrook continued to perform the Tabasco opera under the name "The Grand Vizier" in 1895 in the following cities:

- Indianapolis, IN (ca. Jan. 17)
- Saginaw, MI (Feb. 8)
- New York, NY (Mar. 5)

=== 2018 New Orleans production ===
In 2012 New Orleans conductor Paul Mauffray became one of the first musicians to rediscover the opera's missing libretto along with other, related historical documents. This event spurred him to reconstruct the score based on the surviving but incomplete sheet music. In 2014 Mauffray conducted part of the Burlesque Opera Tabasco in New Orleans and also conducted excerpts in such disparate locales as Austria, the Czech Republic and Slovak Republic, California, and Chattanooga. In January 2018 Paul Mauffray conducted the entire opera in a production of New Orleans Opera Association directed by Josh Shaw, complete with sets and costumes, in performances at Le Petit Théâtre du Vieux Carré in New Orleans' French Quarter

== External links and reviews ==
- Media related to Burlesque Opera of Tabasco at Wikimedia Commons
- Original 1894 score publication, published under the title "Tabasco"
- Excerpts from the 2018 New Orleans Opera Association production of "The Burlesque Opera Tabasco"
- Youtube playlist of excerpts from the Burlesque Opera of Tabasco
- "Dance of the Harem" from the Burlesque Opera of Tabasco
- NPR National Public Radio coverage of the Tabasco Opera
- "Love and hot sauce: New Orleans revives 1894 Tabasco opera" Associated Press by Janet McConnaughey January 23, 2018
- 1-minute video: Tabasco themed opera returns to New Orleans WGNO TV January 25, 2018
- 3-minute video report with performance excerpts and interviews by WWOZ January 23, 2018
- New Orleans Revives 1894 Tabasco Opera, VOA Voice of America, January 23, 2018
- "Long-Forgotten Opera About Tabasco Sauce Heats Up Stage Again After Almost 125 Years" Smithsonian magazine January 25, 2018
- "A Saucy Number - The Burlesque Opera of Tabasco spices up the stage again" Country Roads magazine December 22, 2017
- "A Long-Lost Opera About Tabasco Sauce Is Being Revived in New Orleans" Food & Wine magazine December 20, 2017
