= Maunsel White =

American politician (c. 1783–1863)

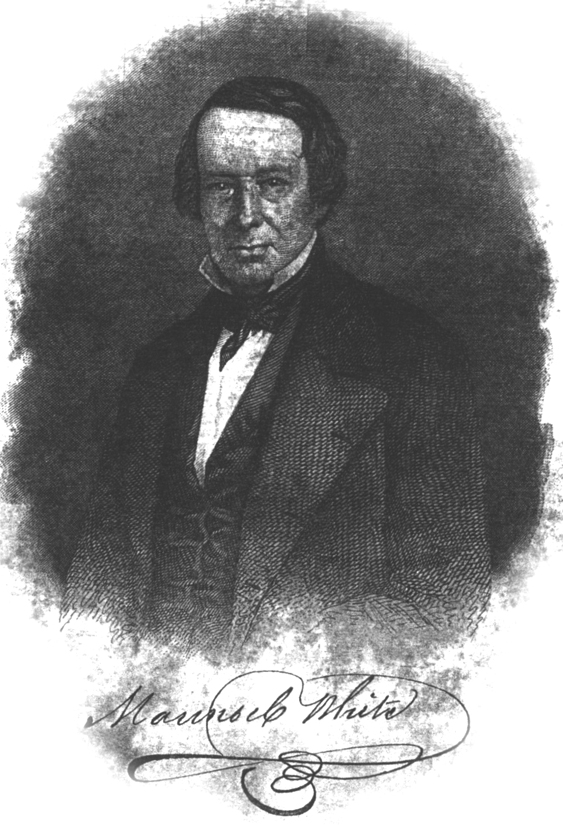
Maunsel White, as depicted in DeBow's Review (1853)

Maunsel White (c. 1783 – December 17, 1863) was an Irish-born American slave owner, Episcopalian politician, merchant, and entrepreneur. He is remembered for promoting the use of peppers and peppery sauces—a brand of which his descendants still manufacture today. Although he is usually associated with New Orleans, he also resided in Plaquemines Parish, Louisiana, where he owned Deer Range Plantation, in addition to three other plantations, with 191 slaves in 1850.

== Background ==
Born in Ireland around 1783, White immigrated to the United States as a penniless thirteen-year-old. He first settled in Louisville, Kentucky, where he became closely acquainted with future U.S. President Zachary Taylor. He moved to New Orleans around 1800.

White married a French Creole, Celestine de la Ronde, who hailed from a wealthy New Orleans family allied with military leader and future U.S. president Andrew Jackson. On Celestine's death, White married her sister, Heloise.

White died in Plaquemines Parish, Louisiana, on December 17, 1863.

== Military experience ==
During the War of 1812, White bore the rank of captain and commanded the Louisiana Blues, a company of uniformed volunteers that participated in the Battle of New Orleans.

White became acquainted with General Andrew Jackson, commander of the American forces at New Orleans, who appointed him to negotiate with the defeated British regarding the exchange of prisoners and restitution of slaves. (White maintained a lifelong friendship with Jackson, for whom he served as a cotton factor from 1826 until Jackson's death in 1845.)

When White heard a British soldier remark that the battle had been "a mere skirmish," White replied, "One more such skirmish and devilish few of you will ever get back to tell the story."

It may have been during wartime that White obtained the title "Colonel", although, as was tradition in the antebellum South, the rank may have been more honorary than literal.

== Business career ==
Possessing only an informal education, White entered business as an accounting clerk, and over many years worked his way into a position of wealth and influence in New Orleans. He eventually founded his own cotton factor business, Maunsel White and Company, which also sold sugar, molasses, tobacco, pork, and corn. He was a member of The Boston Club.

By 1845 White had retired as an active partner in Maunsel White and Company in order to focus on growing sugarcane on his plantations, particularly Deer Range, where he made his home. White tried to operate Deer Range as a model plantation, investing heavily in new equipment to modernize and streamline sugar production. Although he primarily produced sugar at Deer Range Plantation, White also grew large amounts of corn, as well as small amounts of rice and indigo.

A large slaveholder (he owned over two hundred slaves at Deer Range alone), White once wrote to an acquaintance, "I have made myself a solemn promise never to sell a Negro – it is a traffic I have never done. I would rather give them their liberty than sell them." Yet DeBow's Review, a planter's journal in which White invested, once noted in print that White "thinks the South can never maintain her strength except by the opening of new sources of supply of labor, and thus favors the slave-trade."

== Political career and civic leadership ==
In 1812 White was elected to the New Orleans City Council.

White became a member of the city of New Orleans' Finance Committee, during which time he suggested a successful plan for making property owners pay the cost of paving streets in the rainy, semi-tropical city. He also put forth an unsuccessful plan to protect the low-lying city from flooding. As president of one of several railroad conventions, White labored to bring this relatively new method of transportation to Louisiana.

Governor Henry Johnson of Louisiana appointed White one of the first board members for the newly founded University of Louisiana (not to be confused with the present-day University of Louisiana). White often made personal donations to that institution, now known as Tulane University.

In 1846 White was elected to the Louisiana Senate as a "Democratic-Unionist." During his four years in office he served on the Committees of Finance and Commerce, and he often served as President Pro Tem of the Senate.

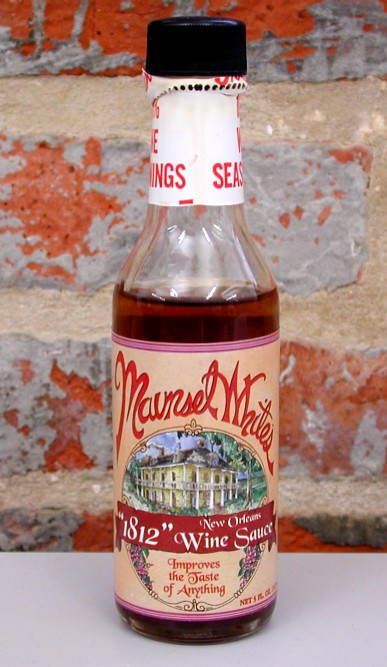
A modern-day bottle of Maunsel White's 1812 Sauce.

== Peppers and sauces ==
Despite his varied career in business, politics, and civic matters, White is best known today as an grower and promoter of peppers, and as an inventor of two sauces, one a pepper sauce, and the other a wine sauce.

An 1850 New Orleans Daily Delta newspaper article (reprinted in several other sources at the time) noted that "Col. White has introduced the celebrated tobasco [sic] red pepper, the very strongest of all peppers, of which he has cultivated a large quantity with the view of supplying his neighbors, and diffusing it through the state." Furthermore, observed the newspaper, "by pouring strong vinegar on it after boiling, he has made a sauce or pepper decoction of it, which possesses in a most concentrated form all the qualities of the vegetable. A single drop of this sauce will flavor a whole plate of soup or other food."

Although White never marketed this pepper sauce, his heirs advertised it for sale beginning in 1864, a year after White's death (as "Maunsel White’s Concentrated Essence of Tobasco [sic] Pepper"). The White family apparently ceased production of this sauce in the late nineteenth-century. McIlhenny Company, maker of world-famous Tabasco brand pepper sauce, denies persistent claims that its founder, Edmund McIlhenny, obtained his peppers and pepper sauce recipe from Maunsel White.

White's other sauce, known as "Maunsel White's 1812 Sauce", contains a mixture of wines, peppers, and spices. According to White family lore, White invented his 1812 Sauce to commemorate the victory of his friend Andrew Jackson at the Battle of New Orleans. In fact, White supposedly first served the sauce during a dinner at his Deer Range Plantation in Jackson's honor. The present-day White family still manufactures this wine sauce on a limited basis and sells it primarily in the New Orleans area.

== Footnotes ==
1. Benson J. Lossing, Pictorial Field-Book of the War of 1812 (New York: Harper and Brothers, 1868), cited on Rootsweb.com.
2. William Henry Perrin, ed., "Battle of New Orleans," Southwest Louisiana Biographical and Historical (1891), Note V, pp. 349–404, cited at Louisiana USGenWeb Archives.
3. Clement Eaton, "Maunsel White," The Mind of the Old South (Baton Rouge, La.: Louisiana State University Press, 1964), p. 51.
4. "Maunsel White, of Louisiana," DeBow's Review XXV (October 1858), p. 482.
5. John Kendall, History of New Orleans (Chicago and New York: The Lewis Publishing Company, 1922), cited on History of New Orleans.
6. "Pepper," New Orleans Daily Delta, January 26, 1850.
7. TABASCO.com.
