= McElhenney =

McElhenney and McElhenny are both surnames. Notable people with the surname include:

- Marcus McElhenney (born 1981), American rower
- Hugh McElhenny (1928–2022), American football player
- Rob McElhenney (born 1977), American actor

== See also ==
- Josiah McElheny (born 1966), American artist
- Victor McElheny (1935–2025), American science writer
- Ausenbaugh–McElhenny House, historic building in Dayton, Ohio
- McElhinney
- McIlhenny
