= Walter Stauffer McIlhenny =

United States Marine Corps general

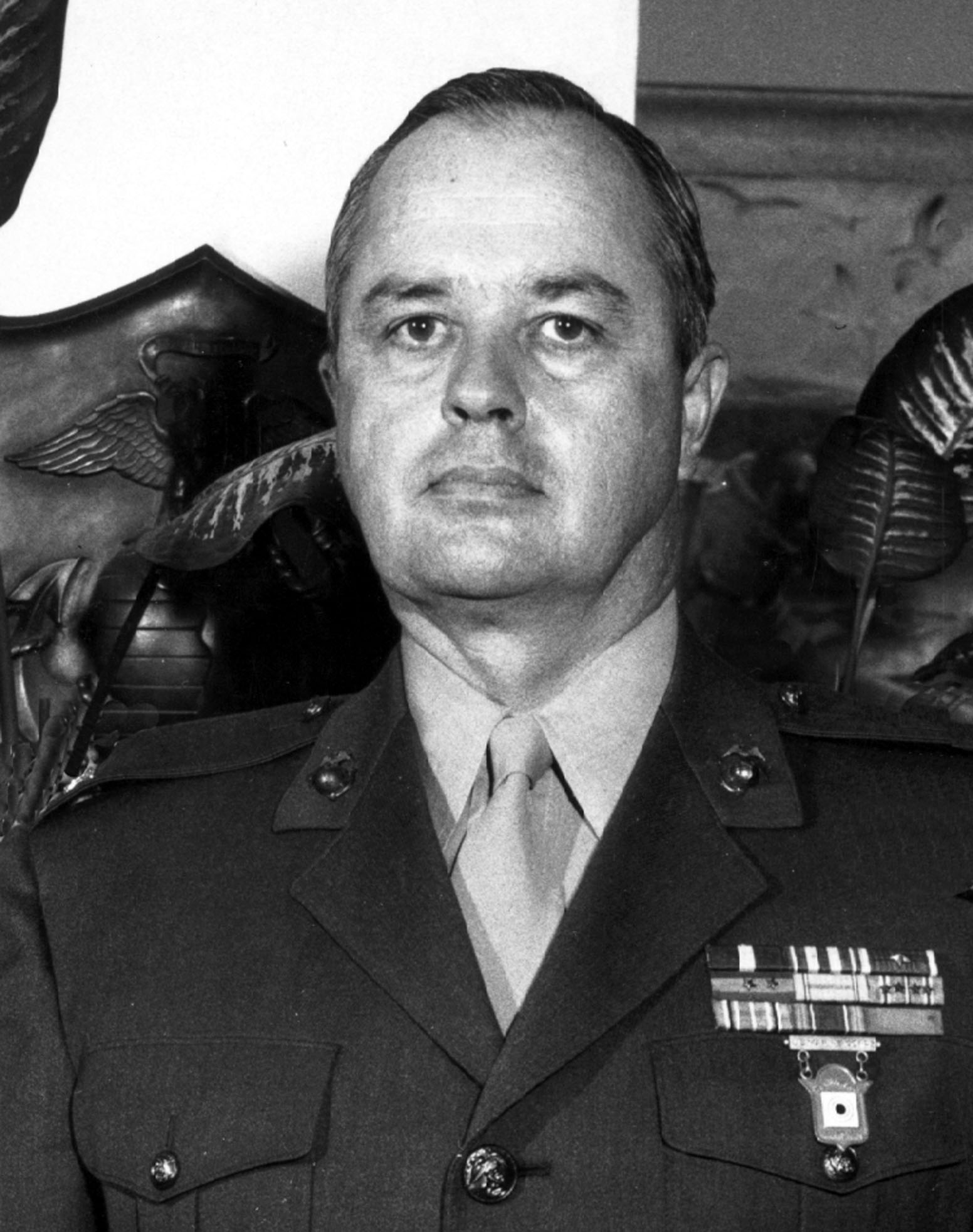
- Brigadier General Walter S. McIlhenny
- Born: October 22, 1910; Washington, D.C.
- Died: June 22, 1985 (aged 74); Lafayette, Louisiana
- Burial place: Avery Island, Louisiana
- Military career
- Allegiance: United States of America
- Branch: United States Marine Corps
- Service years: 1931–1935 (VNG); 1935–1959 (USMCR)
- Rank: Brigadier general
- Nickname: 'Tabasco Mac'
- Conflicts: World War II; Battle of Guadalcanal; New Britain; Battle of Peleliu
- Awards: Navy Cross; Silver Star; Purple Heart (2)
- Other work: McIlhenny Company, president; Marine Military Academy, co-founder

Walter Stauffer McIlhenny (October 22, 1910 – June 22, 1985) served as president of McIlhenny Company, maker of Tabasco brand pepper sauce, from 1949 until his death in 1985. He also distinguished himself as a member of the U.S. Marine Corps Reserve — receiving the Navy Cross for his actions during the Battle of Guadalcanal and retiring as a brigadier general. He was a co-founder, trustee, and president emeritus of the Marine Military Academy in Harlingen, Texas.

== Military service ==
Having joined the Virginia National Guard in 1931 and served on its rifle team, McIlhenny transferred to the U.S. Marine Corps Reserve in 1935, attended Platoon Leaders Class, and served as captain of the U.S. Marine Corps Reserve rifle team.

Called to active duty when the United States became involved in World War II, McIlhenny spent 31 months in the western Pacific as a member of B Company, 1st Battalion, 5th Marines, 1st Marine Division. At Guadalcanal, he received the Navy Cross, the Silver Star, and the Purple Heart. He also saw action at New Britain and at Peleliu, where he received a second Purple Heart.

Upon retirement from the Marine Corps Reserve, McIlhenny received a promotion to brigadier general.

McIlhenny's combat helmet, along with the captured Japanese shin guntō sword that dented it, are on display at the National World War II Museum (formerly the National D-Day Museum) in New Orleans, Louisiana.

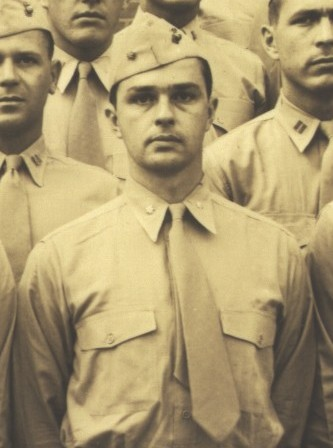
Major Walter Stauffer McIlhenny, USMCR, at Quantico, Virginia, ca. 1945

Captain Walter Stauffer McIlhenny's combat helmet and the captured Japanese shin guntō that dented it, National World War II Museum, New Orleans, Louisiana

== Business career ==
Despite his interest in military service, McIlhenny felt obliged to enter the family business around 1940, when he began executive training at McIlhenny Company, maker of world-famous Tabasco brand pepper sauce at Avery Island, Louisiana. McIlhenny's grandfather, Edmund McIlhenny, had invented the fiery condiment. His father, John Avery McIlhenny, had presided over the company from 1890 to 1898.

World War II interrupted McIlhenny's training at McIlhenny Company, but he returned to the organization in 1946, assumed its presidency in 1949, and retained that office until his own death in 1985. During his tenure as head of the company, McIlhenny expanded and modernized the production and marketing of Tabasco brand pepper sauce and helped to mold the brand into an international culinary icon.

McIlhenny would draw on his experience with the mid-century "C-Ration" to produce the Charlie Ration Cookbook or No Food Is Too Good for the Man Up Front. Bundled with a 2-ounce bottle of Tabasco sauce within a waterproof container, the humorous cookbook offered recipes for the production of diverse meals from standard C-Rations, combined with Tabasco sauce and other ingredients.

In the early 1980s the US Army began to issue Meals Ready to Eat, commonly called "MREs". Each MRE includes a miniature bottle of McIlhenny Tabasco sauce.

== Personal life ==
McIlhenny was a personal acquaintance of many prominent figures in the food industry, such as James Beard and Paul Prudhomme.

McIlhenny was an avid hunter, participated in many big game hunts in the U.S. and Canada, and went on several African safaris and Indian shikars. A lifetime member of the National Rifle Association of America, he also served United States Olympic Rifle Committee that oversaw the U.S. Olympic rifle and pistol team.

McIlhenny died June 22, 1985, in Lafayette, Louisiana, and was interred in a family cemetery at Avery Island, Louisiana. Unmarried, he left much of his estate to the Marine Military Academy.

== Medals and decorations ==
A partial list of Walter S. McIlhenny's medals and decorations includes:

| Navy Cross | Silver Star | Legion of Merit |
| Purple Heart w/ 1 award star | Navy Presidential Unit Citation w/ 2 service stars | American Defense Service Medal |
| American Campaign Medal | Asiatic-Pacific Campaign Medal w/ 4 service stars | World War II Victory Medal |

McIlhenny is also the recipient of the following marksmanship awards:

- Hilton Trophy
- Roumanian Trophy x 2
- Rattlesnake Trophy
- Bronze medal in the National Individual Rifle Match, which entitled him to the Distinguished Marksman Badge.

=== Navy Cross citation ===
His Navy Cross citation reads as follows:

For extraordinary heroism and courage as Executive Officer of Company B, 1st Battalion, 5th Marines, 1st Marine Division, during a frontal assault upon a strongly fortified enemy Japanese position along the coast of Guadalcanal, Solomon Islands, August 27, 1942. After organizing a volunteer party to advance and evacuate the wounded from the hazardous position well forward of the company, First Lieutenant Mcllhenny, armed only with a rifle, and while under heavy enemy mortar and machine gun fire, covered the advance and withdrawal of the rescue party, gallantly drawing enemy fire and silencing a Japanese machine gun nest. Although ill at the time and suffering shock from concussion of an enemy mortar shell, he returned to a vantage point close to enemy lines and, in the face of fierce sniper fire, acted as an observer, relaying accurate information necessary for fire control until ordered by his superior officer to leave his post. His great personal valor, above and beyond the call of duty, not only made possible the rescue of nine wounded men but also contributed to the success of Marine mortar fire.

=== Silver Star citation ===
His citation on receiving the Silver Star reads thus:

For conspicuous gallantry and intrepidity in action while in command of Company B, 1st Battalion, 5th Marines, 1st Marine Division, in combat against enemy Japanese forces on Guadalcanal, Solomon Islands, on November 2, 1942. After a previous attempt to secure information had failed, Captain McIlhenny led a patrol of approximately twenty men to reconnoiter the enemy's right flank and, moving through dense jungle, cleared the zone of hostile snipers and finally reached his objective. Completing his mission, he started to lead his patrol back to their own lines when they were spotted by the enemy who immediately opened fire, pinning them down. When almost all of his men were wounded, including two runners who had been dispatched to the battalion, Captain McIlhenny, despite his own injury, determined to carry the message himself and finally succeeded in reaching our lines. His great courage and unswerving devotion to duty enabled his company to attack the enemy's flank and capture their position. His superb leadership and indomitable fighting spirit were in keeping with the highest traditions of the United States Naval Service.

== See also ==
- Edmund McIlhenny
- Edward Avery McIlhenny
- John Avery McIlhenny

"Semper Fi, Mac", Pg. 315, Henry Berry, Tabasco Mac, Major USMCR
