= Southwest Pass (Vermilion Parish) =

Strait in Louisiana, U.S.

Coordinates: 29°34′26″N 92°02′43″W

Southwest Pass is a narrow strait in Vermilion Parish in southern Louisiana in the United States. It connects the Gulf of Mexico to its south with Vermilion Bay to its north. It is bounded on the east by Marsh Island (in Iberia Parish) and on the west by the Louisiana mainland in southeastern Vermilion Parish.

Southwest Pass should not be confused with a channel in the Mississippi River Delta at the mouth of the Mississippi River also known as Southwest Pass.
