= Vermilion Bay (Louisiana) =

Gulf of Mexico inlet

Coordinates: 29°43′11″N 91°58′34″W

Vermilion Bay (French: Baie Vermilion) is a bay in southern Louisiana, in the United States.

Vermilion Bay is located in southwestern Iberia Parish and southeastern Vermilion Parish. It is an inlet of the Gulf of Mexico to which it is connected to the south by a narrow strait, Southwest Pass. Marsh Island and a portion of the Louisiana mainland in southeastern Vermilion Parish otherwise separate it from the Gulf of Mexico. On the east, Vermilion Bay connects directly to West Cote Blanche Bay.
