= Tabasco sauce =

American hot sauce brand

Tabasco

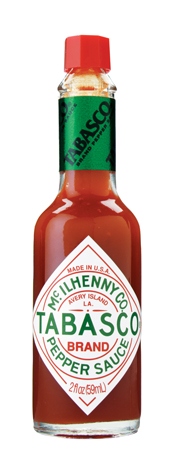
- Original Tabasco red pepper sauce
- Type: Privately held company
- Industry: Food
- Founded: 1868 (158 years ago)
- Founder: Edmund McIlhenny
- Key people: Harold Osborn (CEO)
- Products: Hot sauce and other condiments
- Brands: Tabasco
- Owner: McIlhenny family
- Number of employees: c. 200 (per company website, August 2014)
- Heat: Medium
- Scoville scale: 2,500–5,000 SHU
- Website: tabasco.com

Tabasco is an American brand of hot sauce made from vinegar, tabasco peppers, and salt. It is produced by the McIlhenny Company of Avery Island in southern Louisiana, having been created in 1868 by Edmund McIlhenny. Originally, the tabasco peppers were grown only on Avery Island; they are now primarily cultivated in Central America, South America, and Africa. The Tabasco sauce brand also has multiple varieties, including the original red sauce, habanero, jalapeño, chipotle, sriracha, and scorpion. Tabasco products are sold in more than 195 countries and territories, and packaged in 36 languages and dialects.

== History ==
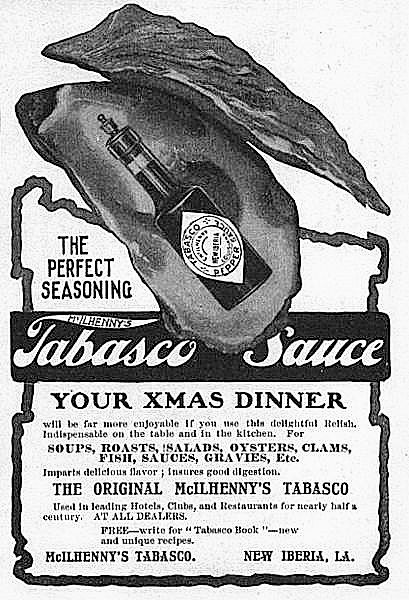
A Tabasco advertisement from c. 1905: Note the cork-top bottle and diamond logo label, which is similar to those in use today.

According to the company's official history, Tabasco was first produced in 1868 by Edmund McIlhenny, a Maryland-born former banker who had moved to Louisiana around 1840. However, as Jeffrey Rothfeder's book McIlhenny's Gold points out, some of the McIlhenny Company's official history is disputed, and the politician Maunsel White was producing a tabasco pepper sauce two decades before McIlhenny. A 2007 book review by Mark Robichaux of The Wall Street Journal quotes Rothfeder's book:

The story actually begins in the pre-Civil War era with a New Orleans plantation owner named Maunsel White, who was famous for the food served at his sumptuous dinner parties. Mr. White's table no doubt groaned with the region's varied fare—drawing inspiration from European, Caribbean, and Cajun sources—but one of his favorite sauces was of his own devising, made from a pepper named for its origins in the Mexican state of Tabasco. White added it to various dishes and bottled it for his guests. Although the McIlhennys have tried to dismiss the possibility, it seems clear now that in 1849, a full two decades before Edmund McIlhenny professed to discover the Tabasco pepper, White was already growing Tabasco chilies on his plantation.

Rothfeder cited January 26, 1850, letter to the New Orleans Daily Delta newspaper crediting White as having introduced "Tobasco red pepper" [sic] to the Southern United States and asserting that the McIlhenny was at least inspired by White's recipe. Jean Andrews, in her book Peppers: The Domesticated Capsicums, goes further to declare—citing United States Circuit Court testimony from 1922—that prior to his death in 1862, "White gave some [pepper] pods, along with his recipe, to his friend Edmund McIlhenny, during a visit to White's Deer Range Plantation." To distribute his, Edmund McIlhenny initially obtained unused cologne bottles from a New Orleans glass supplier. On his death in 1890, McIlhenny was succeeded by his eldest son, John Avery McIlhenny, who expanded and modernized the business, but resigned after only a few years to join Theodore Roosevelt's 1st US Volunteer Cavalry Regiment, the Rough Riders. On John's departure, brother Edward Avery McIlhenny, a self-taught naturalist fresh from an Arctic adventure, assumed control of the company and also focused on expansion and modernization, running the business from 1898 until his death in 1949. Walter S. McIlhenny, in turn, succeeded his uncle Edward Avery McIlhenny, serving as president of McIlhenny Company from 1949 until his death in 1985. Edward McIlhenny Simmons then ran the company as president and CEO for several years, remaining as board chairman until his death in 2012. Paul McIlhenny became company president in 1998 and was chairman until his death in 2013. In 2012, McIlhenny cousin Tony Simmons assumed the company's presidency and, in June 2019, his cousin Harold Osborn was chosen as the next president and CEO. McIlhenny was one of just a few U.S. companies to have received a royal warrant of appointment that certified the company as a supplier to Queen Elizabeth II. McIlhenny was one of the 850 companies around the world that have been officially designated as suppliers to the queen by such warrants. The warrant held was "Supplier of Tabasco HM The Queen — Master of the Household — Granted in 2009". In 2005, Avery Island was hit hard by Hurricane Rita, and the family constructed a 17-foot-high (5.2 m) levee around the low side of the factory and invested in back-up generators.

=== Trademark disputes ===
In a market full of similar products, the McIlhenny business pursued legal means to deny any other business from using the word "tabasco" to describe their hot sauce. This happened even though a common ingredient in these hot sauces was tabasco peppers. After five decades of litigation in several courtrooms across the United States, McIlhenny won the rights to using the word "tabasco" as a proprietary name in 1948 from a court in Louisiana. This, in spite of losses in other courts, allowed McIlhenny to call his sauce "tabasco" and barred any other competitor from using what used to be a generic name for the product except as an ingredient.

In Peppers: A Story of Hot Pursuits author Amal Naj researched these lawsuits and concluded "that there wasn't much of a basis for anyone to claim an exclusive right to the name," while the McIlhenny business maintains arguments to the contrary, asserting that their peppers and product are distinct enough to merit a trademark.

After the initial wave of lawsuits, their frequency diminished, but did not stop completely. In the 1970s Walter Greenleaf, a professor of horticulture at Auburn University, developed a new variety of tabasco chili, naming it "Greenleaf tabasco." Since Greenleaf's research was taxpayer-funded, the name threatened the McIlhenny business' exclusive right to the word "tabasco." The McIlhenny side threatened to sue. The case reached the U.S. attorney general's office, which settled the matter, saying the name had been validly published in the International Code of Nomenclature of Cultivated Plants. Years later a McIlHenny representative approached Greenleaf for seeds of his variety of tabasco, a request which Greenleaf was happy to satisfy to encourage the growth of more tabasco plants.

In 1979 the company's lawyers contacted Sam Weiner, an artist who went by Ms. Tabasco, claiming the use of "their client's trademark is improper and illegal." This dispute was never resolved.

== Production ==
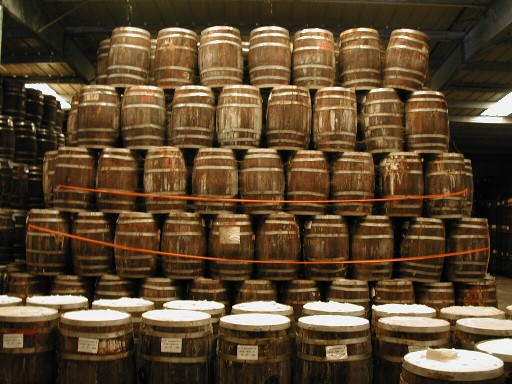
Tabasco pepper mash aging in barrels on Avery Island, Louisiana

Originally, all peppers used in Tabasco sauce were grown on Avery Island. Over time, growers were selected throughout Louisiana to accommodate demand and during the 1960s, the company established farms in various Latin American countries. As of 2013, peppers grown on the island are used to produce seed stock, which is then shipped to foreign growers. More predictable weather and readily available farmland in these locales allow a constant, year-round supply. This ensures the availability of peppers should severe weather or other problems occur at a particular growing location. Following company tradition, peppers are picked by hand. To ensure ripeness, pickers compare peppers to a little red stick (le petit bâton rouge); peppers that match the color of the stick are then introduced into the sauce production process. Peppers are ground into a mash on the day of harvest and placed along with salt in white oak barrels previously used for whiskey of various distilleries. To prepare the barrel, the inside of the barrel is decharred (top layer of wood is removed), torched, and cleaned, to minimize the presence of any residual whiskey. The barrels are then used in warehouses on Avery Island for aging the mash. After aging for up to three years, the mash is strained to remove skins and seeds. The resulting liquid is then mixed with distilled vinegar, stirred occasionally for a month, and then bottled as a finished sauce. Tabasco has released a Tabasco reserve edition with peppers aged for up to eight years, mixed with wine vinegar. Tabasco Diamond Reserve Edition was a limited bottling released in 2018 to commemorate the brand's 150th anniversary. This sauce consists of peppers that have been aged for up to 15 years, then mixed with sparkling white wine vinegar. For many years, the salt used in Tabasco production came from the Avery Island salt dome, the largest such structure along the Louisiana coast.

== Varieties ==
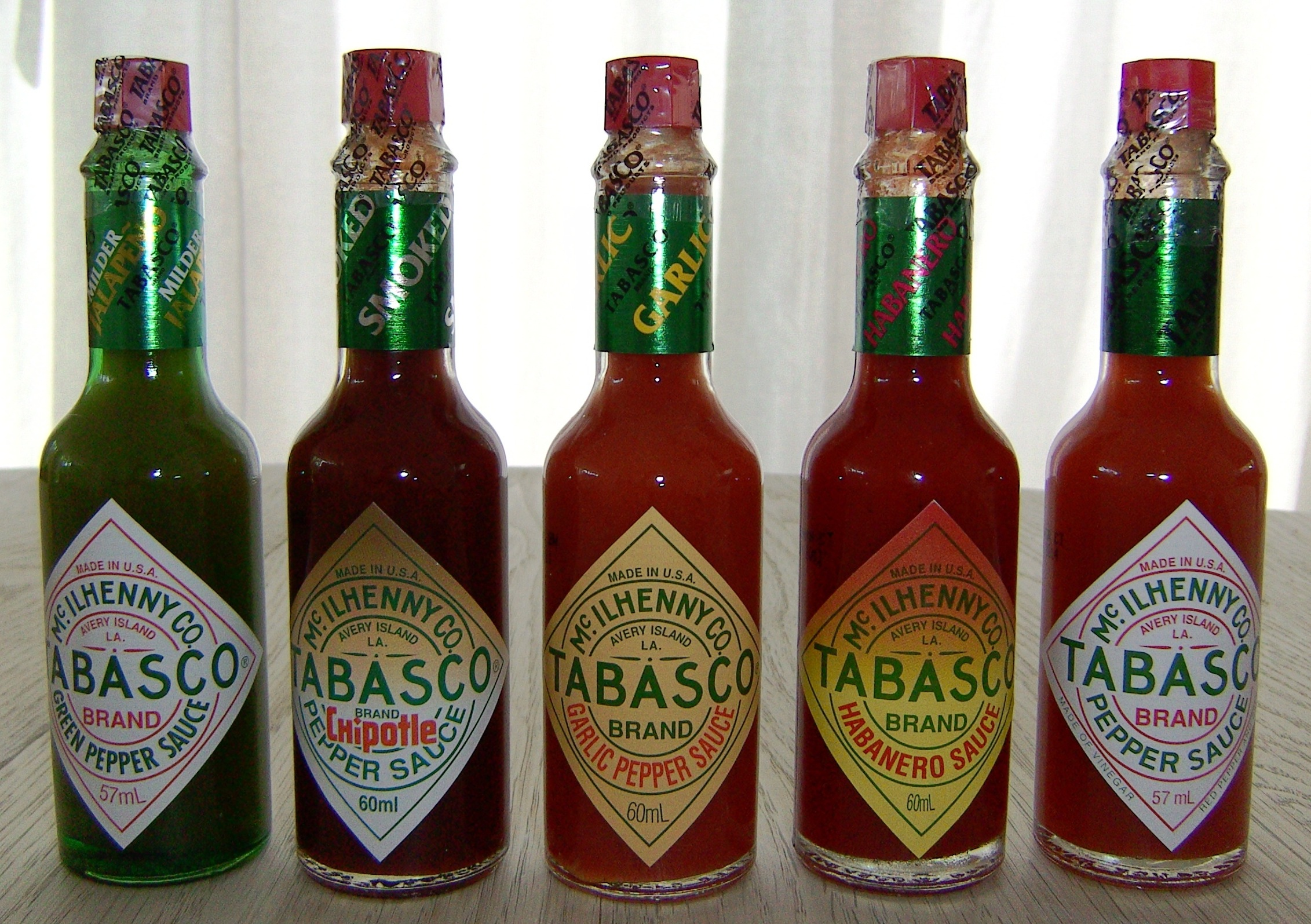
A few of the varieties of Tabasco sauce, with the original on the far right

Several sauces are produced under the Tabasco brand name. A few of the varieties include:

=== Current sauces ===
- Buffalo Style Hot Sauce
- Cayenne garlic
- Chipotle Sauce
- Family Reserve
- Green Jalapeño Sauce
- Habanero
- Original Red Sauce
- Raspberry Chipotle
- Roasted Pepper Sauce
- Salsa Picante
- Scorpion Sauce
- Sriracha
- Sweet and Spicy
- Smoked

=== Discontinued sauces ===
- Rocoto pepper sauce

The habanero, chipotle, and garlic sauces include the tabasco peppers blended with other peppers, whereas the jalapeño variety does not include tabasco peppers. None of these sauces, however, has the three-year aging process the flagship product uses. The brand also produces a selection of Tabasco Chocolate.

== Spiciness ==
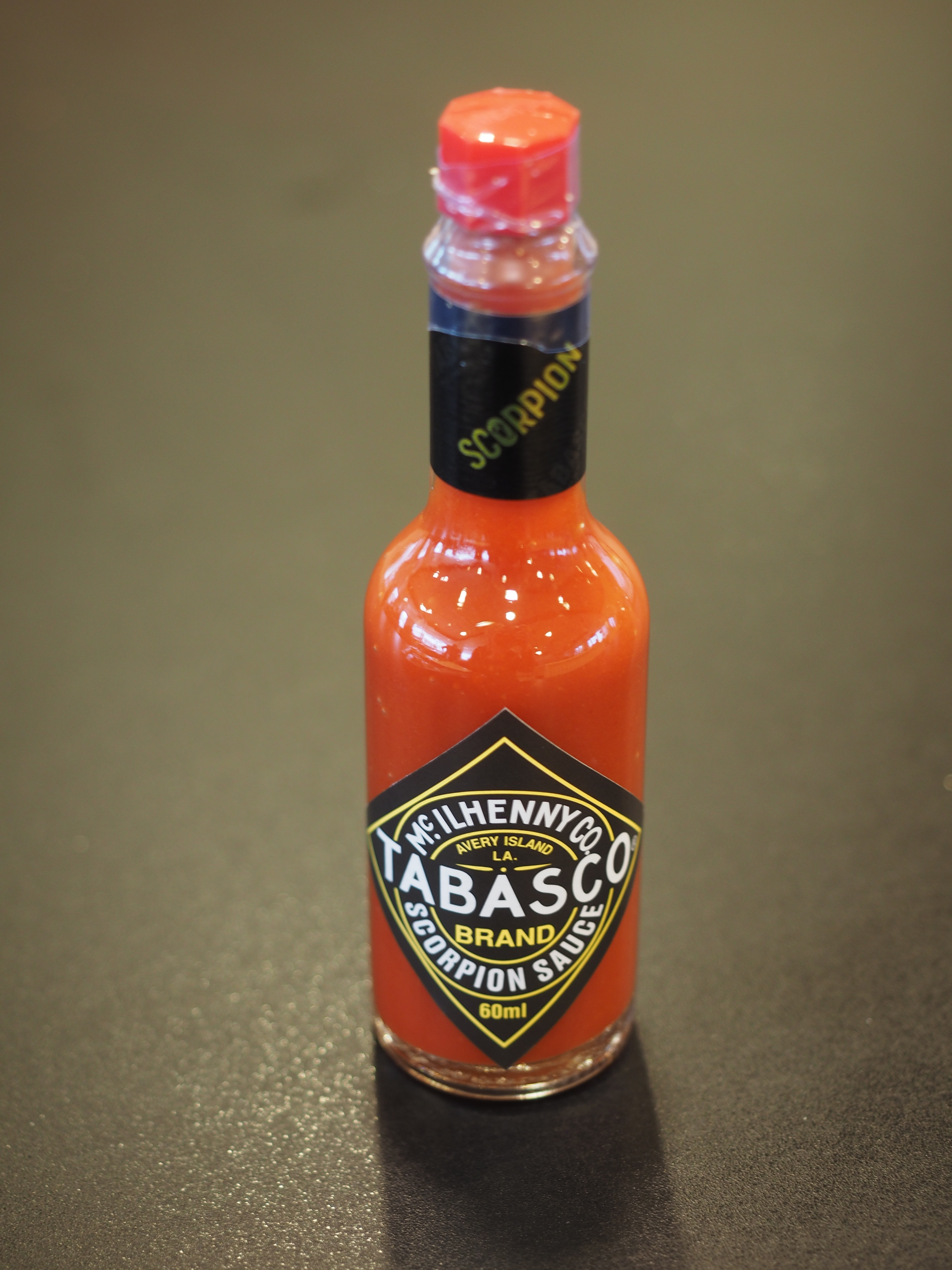
Tabasco Scorpion Sauce is the hottest sauce of the Tabasco brand, reaching up to 60,000 Scoville units.

Sauce	Scoville units	Notes
Tabasco Pepper Sauce	2,500–5,000	Original flagship variety
Habanero Sauce	7,000–8,000	
Chipotle Sauce	1,500–2,500	Chipotle-based sauce that also features pepper pulp created as part of the production of the original sauce
Cayenne Garlic Sauce	1,200–2,400	Blends milder peppers in with the tabasco peppers
Green Jalapeño Sauce	600–1,200	Green pepper sauce
Buffalo Style Sauce	1,200–2,500	Like garlic, but with a tangy flavor
Scorpion Sauce	40,000–60,000	The hottest of the sauces

== Packaging ==
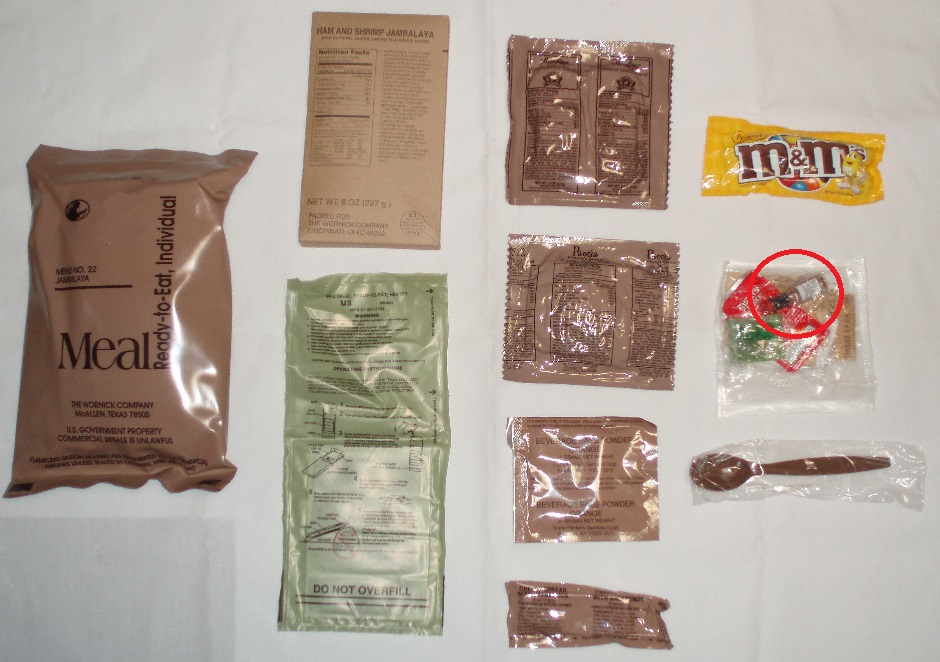
Tabasco sauce highlighted in an MRE, middle right

Tabasco brand pepper sauce is sold in more than 195 countries and territories and is packaged in 36 languages and dialects. The Tabasco bottle is still modeled after the cologne-style bottles used for the first batch of sauce in 1868. As many as 720,000 two-ounce (57 ml) bottles of Tabasco sauce are produced daily at the Tabasco factory on Avery Island. Bottles range from the common two-ounce and five-ounce (59 ml and 148 ml) bottles, up to a 1-US-gallon (3.8 L; 0.83 imp gal) jug for food-service businesses, and down to a 1/8-US-fluid-ounce (3.7 ml) miniature bottle. Also, 0.11-US-fluid-ounce (3.3 ml) portion-control packets of Tabasco sauce are produced. These one-eighth-ounce bottles of Tabasco, bearing the presidential seal, are served on Air Force One. The US military has included Tabasco sauce in Meals, Ready-to-Eat (MREs) since the 1980s. The Australian, British and Canadian armies also issue small bottles of Tabasco sauce in their rations.

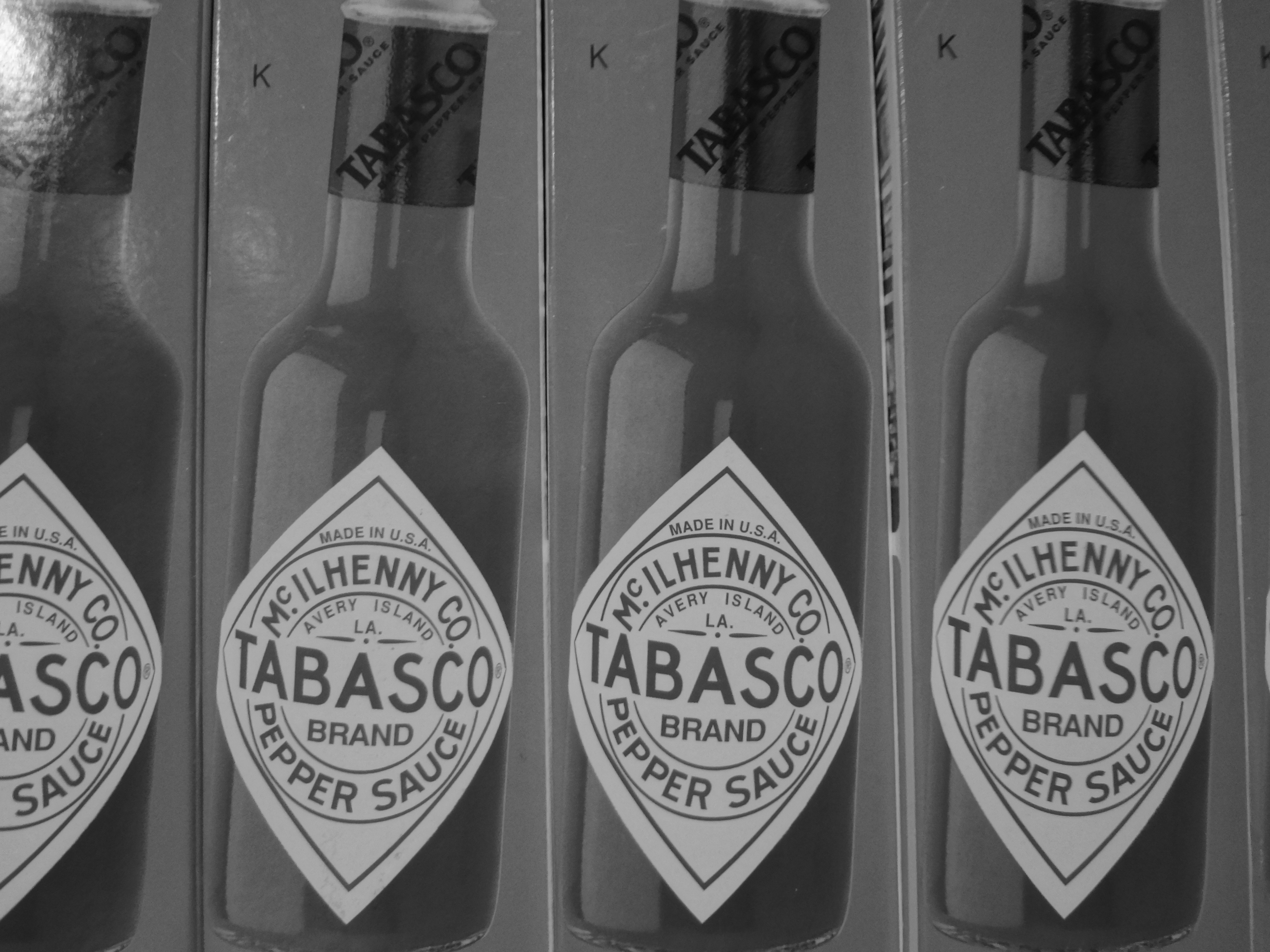
Tabasco sauce packaging

== Uses ==
McIlhenny Company produces or has produced Tabasco brand products that contain pepper seasoning, including chocolate, popcorn, nuts, olives, mayonnaise, mustard, steak sauce, Worcestershire sauce, soy sauce, teriyaki sauce, Sriracha sauce, marinating sauce, barbecue sauce, chili sauce, vodka, pepper jelly, and Bloody Mary mix. McIlhenny Company also permits other brands to use and advertise Tabasco sauce as an ingredient in their products (a common marketing practice called "co-branding"), including Spam, Hormel chili, Slim Jim beef sticks, Heinz ketchup, A1 steak sauce, Plochman's mustard, Lawry's salt, Zapp's potato chips, Heluva Good dip, and Vlasic Pickles. "Hot & Spicy" flavored Cheez-It crackers for a long time used McIlhenny's Tabasco Green Pepper Sauce until 2018, when Kellogg's replaced it with their own hot sauce. The original red Tabasco sauce has a shelf life of three years when stored in a cool and dry place; other Tabasco flavors have shorter shelf lives. Tabasco appeared on the menu of NASA's Space Shuttle program and went into orbit on the shuttles. It was on Skylab and on the International Space Station and is popular with astronauts as a means of countering the blandness of food in space.

=== Cookbooks ===
During the Vietnam War, Brigadier General Walter S. McIlhenny issued The Charlie Ration Cookbook. (Charlie ration or "C-rats" was the name for the field meal then given to troops.) This cookbook came wrapped around a two-ounce bottle of Tabasco sauce, placed in a water-resistant container. It instructed troops on how to use C-rations to make such meals as "Combat Zone Burgoo" and "Breast of Chicken under Bullets." Soldiers also requested their families to send them Tabasco sauce in "care packages" from home. During the 1990s, the U.S. military began to include miniature bottles of Tabasco sauce in its MREs. Eventually, miniature bottles of Tabasco sauce were included in two-thirds of all MRE menus. During the same period, McIlhenny Company issued a new military-oriented cookbook using characters from the comic strip Beetle Bailey. Titled The Unofficial MRE Cookbook, it was offered free of charge to U.S. troops.

== Toxicity ==
In a 1982 article titled "Pepper Sauce Toxicity", Tabasco pepper sauce's toxicity was evaluated based on red peppers and vinegar. Sprague-Dawley rats (laboratory rats) were used as test subjects. The oral median lethal dose in male lab rats was determined to be 23.58 mL/kg body weight (BW) with an upper limit of 29.75 mL/kg BW and a lower limit of 18.70 mL/kg BW. The median lethal dose in the female lab rats was found to be 19.52 mL/kg BW (15.64 mL/kg BW lower, 24.35 mL/kg BW upper). The sauce was found to be a mild skin irritant and a moderate to severe eye irritant. The toxicity to the eye is mainly caused by vinegar.

== In art and culture ==
In 1894, composer George W. Chadwick wrote the Burlesque Opera of Tabasco, a musical comedy that conductor Paul Mauffray revived in 2018 with support from McIlhenny Company.

Tabasco has appeared in many movies and cartoons, as well as on television. It featured in two James Bond films in the 1970s, The Man with the Golden Gun and The Spy Who Loved Me, as well as a shot of the iconic bottle in Sidney Lumet's 1974 film Murder on the Orient Express. Some appearances date as far back as the Our Gang short "Birthday Blues" in 1932 and Charlie Chaplin's Modern Times in 1936. In Back to the Future Part III, the saloon bartender uses Tabasco as an ingredient for an instant hangover cure he calls "wake-up juice". Tabasco sauce was also an important element in the television series Roswell about alien/human hybrid teenagers who craved foods that were sweet and spicy and often carried bottles of Tabasco sauce with them. When the network tried to cancel the series in the first season, thousands of fans mailed bottles of Tabasco to the network to show their support. The series continued for three seasons.

In the 2009 Disney animated film The Princess and the Frog, Tiana is seen using Tabasco sauce for her gumbo soup. Later on, in 2024, Tiana's Bayou Adventure also features Tabasco sauce as part of the Disneyland and Disney World attraction and is used in Tiana's Palace restaurant meals.

In the "Leykis 101" segment of his talk radio show, Tom Leykis advocated for men putting Tabasco sauce in their condoms after sexual intercourse to act as a spermicide and prevent a woman potentially "stealing the sperm" and using it to impregnate herself. In 2022, a story circulated widely on the internet that the rapper Drake did this after having sex with an Instagram model. However, Tabasco's usefulness as a spermicide is questionable.

The company was featured in a 2011 episode of the Canadian documentary series How It’s Made, detailing how its signature hot sauce is produced.

== See also ==
- Condiment
- List of brand name condiments
- List of hot sauces
- Tabasco Road
- Water pepper
