= McElhinney =

McElhinney is a surname of Irish origin. It may refer to:

- Andrew Repasky McElhinney (born 1979), American film producer born in Philadelphia
- Curtis McElhinney (born 1983), Canadian professional ice hockey goaltender
- Gerry McElhinney (born 1956), Irish sportsman who played Gaelic football, soccer and was also a boxer
- Hayley McElhinney (born 1974) Australian actress
- Ian McElhinney (born 1948), Northern Irish actor and director
- Mandy McElhinney, Australian actress appearing in the TV sketch comedy series Comedy Inc
- Robert McElhinney (1747–1831), Irish-born political figure in Nova Scotia

== See also ==
- McElhenney
- McIlhenny
