= Cote Blanche Bay =

Bay in southern Louisiana, United States

Coordinates: 29.62°N 91.70°W

Cote Blanche Bay is a bay in southern Louisiana in the United States. It is divided into East Cote Blanche Bay and West Cote Blanche Bay.

Cote Blanche Bay is located on the southwest coast of St. Mary Parish; East Cote Blanche Bay forms its southeastern portion and West Cote Blanche Bay makes up its northwestern part. It is an inlet of the Gulf of Mexico, to which East Cote Blanche Bay connects directly on the south; West Cote Blanche Bay connects to the west with Vermilion Bay. Marsh Island (in Iberia Parish) lies to the west of East Cote Blanche Bay and to the south of West Cote Blanche Bay, separating West Cote Blanche Bay from the Gulf of Mexico.
