= Tabasco pepper =

Variety of chili pepper

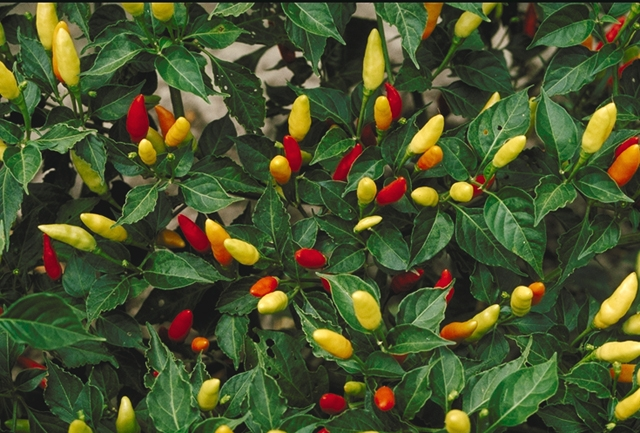
- Tabasco peppers (ripe and unripe)
- Genus: Capsicum
- Species: Capsicum frutescens
- Cultivar: 'Tabasco'
- Heat: Hot
- Scoville scale: 30,000–50,000 SHU

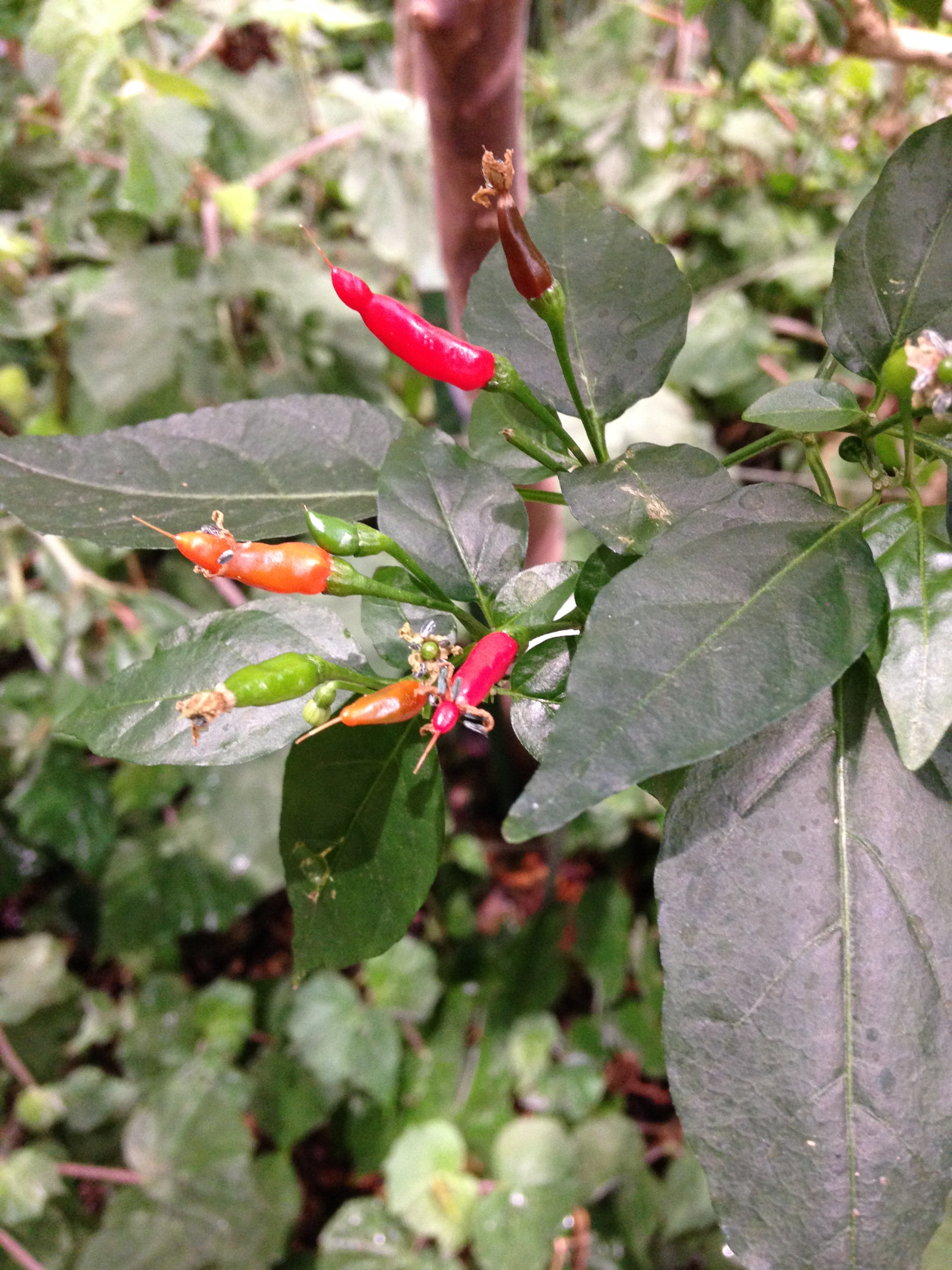
Tabasco pepper on its bush in the Bergianska botanical gardens, Stockholm, 2013

The tabasco pepper is a variety of the chili pepper species Capsicum frutescens originating in Mexico. It is best known through its use in Tabasco sauce, followed by peppered vinegar.

Like all C. frutescens cultivars, the tabasco plant has a typical bushy growth, which commercial cultivation makes stronger by trimming the plants. The tapered fruits, around 4 cm long, are initially pale yellowish-green and turn yellow and orange before ripening to bright red. Tabascos rate from 30,000 to 50,000 on the Scoville scale. Tabasco fruits, like all other members of the C. frutescens species, remain erect when mature, rather than hanging down from their stems.

A large part of the tabasco pepper stock fell victim to the tobacco mosaic virus in the 1960s; the first resistant variety (Greenleaf tabasco) was not cultivated until around 1970.

== Naming ==
The peppers are named after the Mexican state of Tabasco. The initial letter of tabasco is rendered in lowercase when referring to the botanical variety but capitalized when referring to the Mexican state or to the brand of hot sauce, Tabasco sauce.

== Cultivation ==
Tabasco peppers start out green and ripen to orange and then red. It takes approximately 80 days after germination for them to fully mature. The tabasco plant can grow to 1.5 m (60 in) tall, with a cream or light yellow flower that will develop into upward-oriented fruits later in the growing season. As they are native to the Mexican state of Tabasco, seeds require much warmth to germinate and grow best when the temperature is between 25–30 °C (77–86 °F). If grown outside their natural habitat, the peppers are planted two to three weeks after the last frost when soil temperatures exceed 10 °C (50 °F) and the weather has settled. Peppers are temperamental when it comes to setting fruit; if temperatures are too hot or too cool, or if nighttime temperatures fall below 15 °C (60 °F), it can reduce fruit set. A location that receives plenty of light and heat, with soil that is fertile, lightweight, slightly acidic (pH 5.5–7.0), and well-drained, is ideal for growing the plants. Peppers need a steady supply of water for best performance. Growers are careful to make sure that fertilizers and soil are rich in phosphorus, potassium, and calcium and low in nitrogen, which can deter fruit growth.

== See also ==
- Malagueta pepper
- Piri Piri
- Siling labuyo
- List of Capsicum cultivars
