= Southwest Pass (Mississippi River) =

Coordinates: 29°00′51″N 89°20′39″W

Southwest Pass is one of the channels at the mouth of the Mississippi River. It empties into the Gulf of Mexico at the southwesternmost tip of the Mississippi River Delta. It lies in Plaquemines Parish in southeastern Louisiana in the United States. It has been the main shipping channel in the Mississippi River Delta since 1853.

Southwest Pass should not confused with a strait in Vermilion Parish, Louisiana, also known as Southwest Pass.
