= John Avery McIlhenny =

American politician (1867–1942)

- John Avery McIlhenny as a Rough Rider, 1898
- Born: John Avery McIlhenny; 1867; Avery Island, Louisiana
- Died: 1942 (aged 74–75); Farmhouse near Charlottesville, Virginia
- Education: Tulane University; Harvard University
- Occupations: Businessman; soldier; politician; public servant.
- Years active: ?-1922 (retirement)
- Family: Edmund McIlhenny (father); Edward Avery McIlhenny (brother); Walter S. McIlhenny (son)

John Avery McIlhenny (1867–1942) was an American businessman, soldier, politician and civil servant. He was the eldest son of Tabasco sauce inventor Edmund McIlhenny.

== Background ==
Born on Avery Island, Louisiana, McIlhenny was educated on the Island by private tutors before attending Dr. Holbrook's Military School in Sing Sing (now Ossining), New York, and Phillips Academy in Andover, Massachusetts. He later attended business school in Poughkeepsie, New York, as well as Tulane and Harvard universities (although he did not complete his studies).

In the late 1880s McIlhenny worked as a clerk on a ship in the Gulf of Mexico, but returned to Avery Island on the death of his father in 1890. Assuming control of Tabasco operations, he ran McIlhenny Company for eight years, expanding and modernizing production, and increasing promotion and advertising of the increasingly famous product.

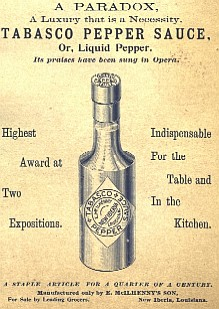
Tabasco brand pepper sauce advertisement from John Avery McIlhenny's tenure as head of McIlhenny Company, circa 1895

== As Rough Rider ==
In 1898 McIlhenny resigned from the company to serve in the Spanish–American War, joining Theodore Roosevelt's Rough Riders volunteer cavalry regiment. "[B]y his high qualities and zealous attention to duty," wrote Roosevelt in his memoir of the campaign, McIlhenny "speedily rose to a sergeantcy, and finally won his lieutenancy for gallantry in action." McIlhenny participated in the Battle of Las Guasimas and the Battle of San Juan Hill and continued to serve despite suffering from measles and malaria.

== Public service ==
On his return to civilian life, McIlhenny served in the Louisiana State Legislature, winning a seat in the Louisiana House of Representatives from 1900 to 1904 and in the state Senate from 1904 to 1906 as a Democrat. A close companion of Theodore Roosevelt, in 1906 he accepted then President Roosevelt's offer to help oversee the United States Civil Service Commission, during which he enacted numerous reforms which streamlined the federal bureaucracy. McIlhenny retained his position with the commission under Roosevelt's successor, William Howard Taft, as well as under Woodrow Wilson.

He resigned in 1919, however, to accept a position with the U.S. State Department as a financial adviser to Haiti, during the island republic's occupation by the U.S. Marines. During his time in Haiti, he clashed with Haitian president Philippe Sudré Dartiguenave over economic issues, which resulted in McIlhenny suspending Dartiguenave's salary, causing a diplomatic crisis and inviting private criticism from the U.S. State Department. The writer and civil rights activist James Weldon Johnson was among his critics, writing that "Mr. McIlhenny's unfitness by training and experience for the delicate and important position which he is filling was one of the most generally admitted facts which I gathered in Haiti."

== Retirement and death ==
McIlhenny retired in 1922 and settled in a farmhouse near Charlottesville, Virginia. Over the next several years he renewed his interest in McIlhenny Company, helping with its reorganization, as a major shareholder in the family-owned company. After a prolonged illness, McIlhenny died in 1942 and was buried in Arlington National Cemetery.

== See also ==
- Edmund McIlhenny
- Edward Avery McIlhenny
- Walter S. McIlhenny
- Tabasco sauce
