= Paul Mauffray =

American conductor

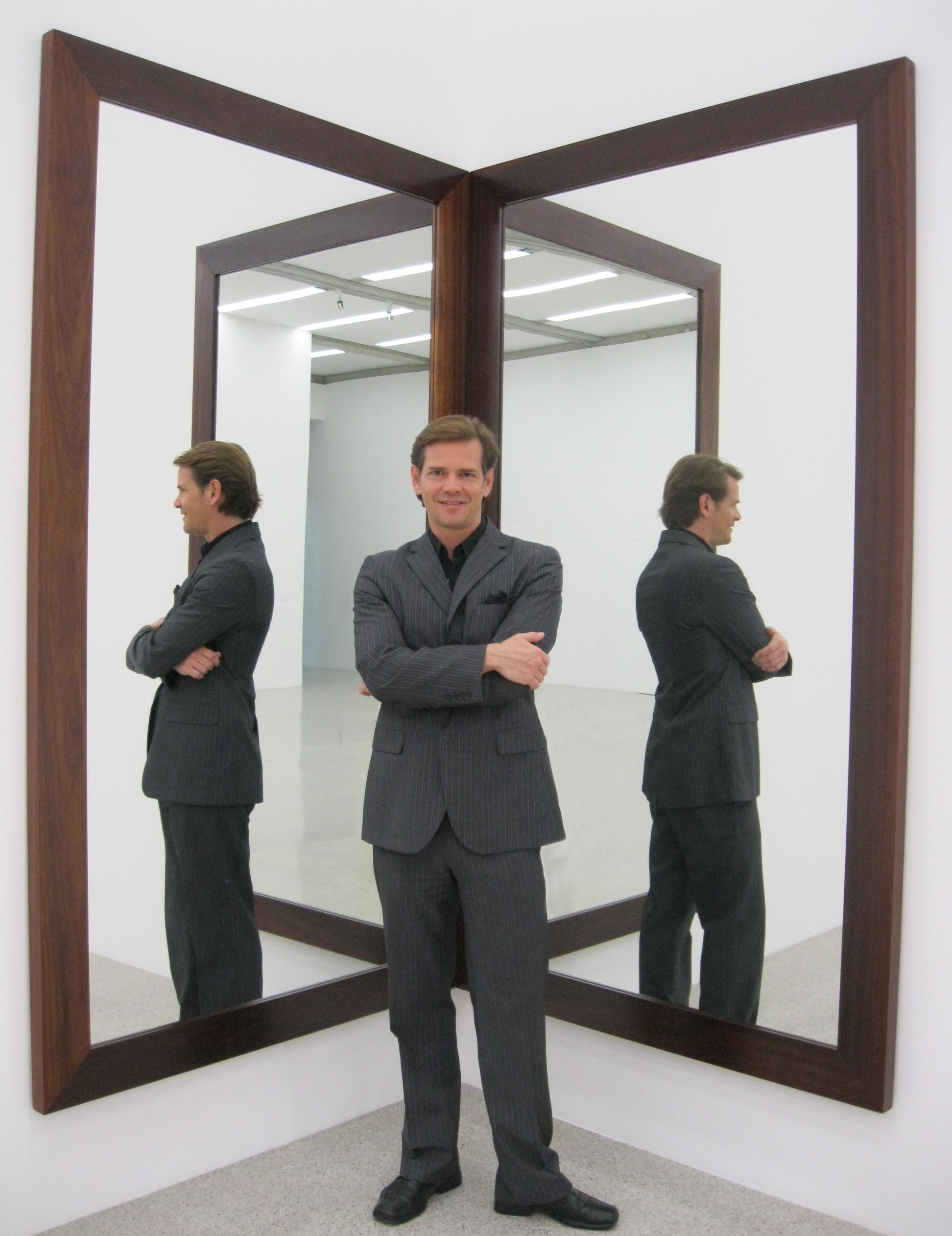
Conductor Paul Mauffray (Vienna, 2012)

Paul Mauffray is an American conductor and laureat of the 2007 Bartók International Opera Conducting Competition, The American Prize for Conductors, and 1996 Freedman Conducting Competition. He has studied at the New Orleans Center for Creative Arts, Louisiana State University, Justus Liebig University (Giessen), Masaryk University (Brno), and earned a Masters of Music degree in Orchestra Conducting as an Associate Instructor / Assistant Conductor at Indiana University's Jacobs School of Music.

He has been engaged in the Czech Republic at the Prague National Theater and National Theater in Brno, and he has worked as assistant conductor to Sir Charles Mackerras with the Czech Philharmonic on recordings of Leoš Janáček's Kata Kabanova and Antonín Dvořák's Rusalka. He has also worked as assistant conductor on operas at the Salzburg Festival, Theater an der Wien, and was a guest conductor at the Romanian National Opera, Bucharest, Schleswig-Holsteinisches Landestheater, Slovak National Theater (Bratislava, Slovakia), Opéra Louisiane, Mobile Opera Alabama, and the Mariinsky Theatre in Saint Petersburg, Russia.

As an advocate for the revival of lost operas, Paul Mauffray recorded excerpts from the 1964 opera The Scarlet Letter by Fredric Kroll with the Brno Philharmonic, and he reconstructed George Whitefield Chadwick's Burlesque Opera of Tabasco which had been lost since 1894 and which he conducted with New Orleans Opera in 2018.

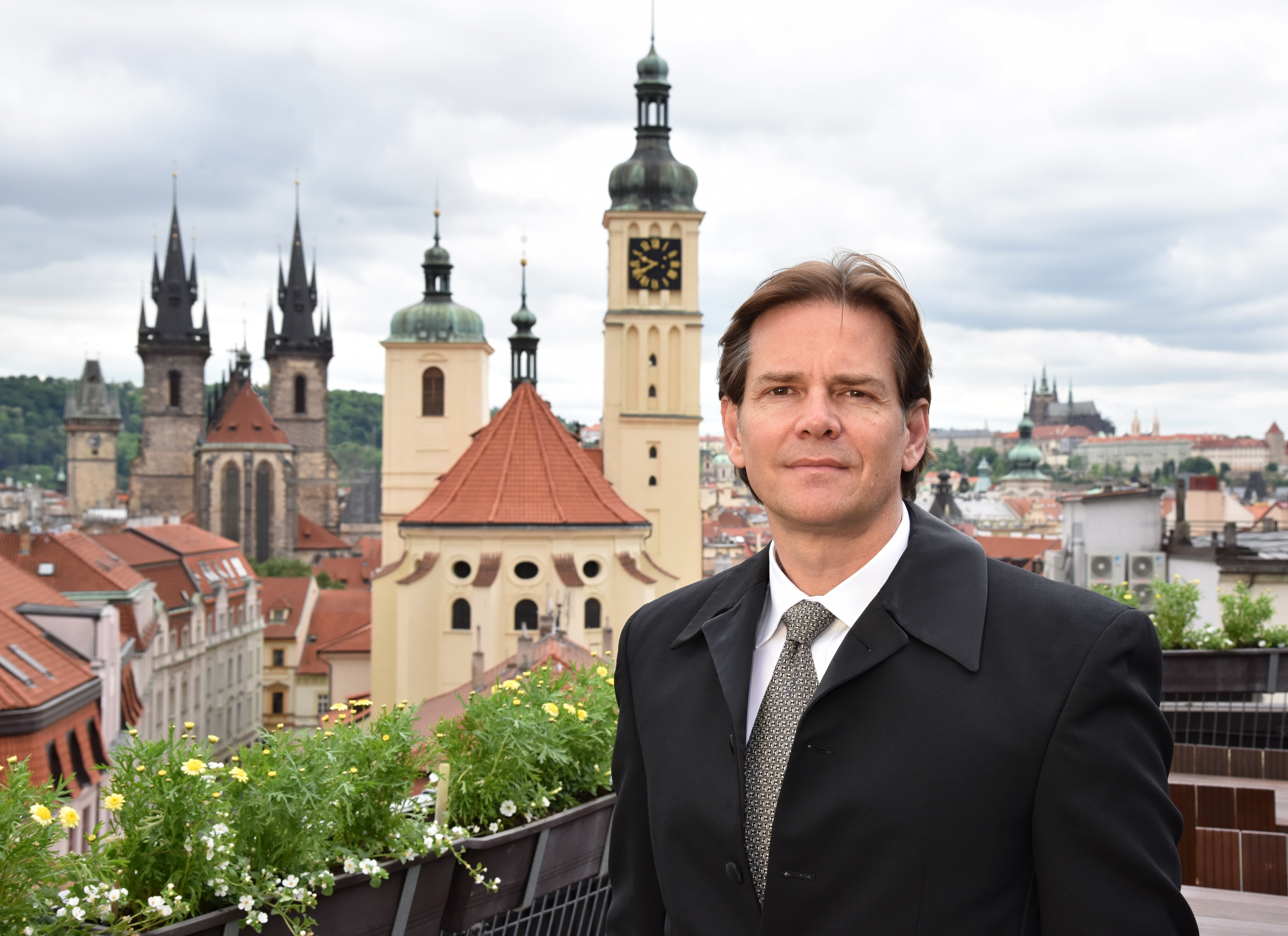
Paul Mauffray, Prague 2017

In 2018, Paul Mauffray was inducted as a national honorary member of Phi Mu Alpha Sinfonia music fraternity and recognized as a Signature Sinfonian.

== Orchestras ==
The orchestras which Paul Mauffray has conducted include the following:

- Academies Festival Orchestra Singapore
- Augsburg Philharmonic
- Bear Valley Festival Orchestra
- Beethoven Orchester Bonn
- Bohuslav Martinu Philharmonic Zlin
- Brno Philharmonic
- Brno National Theater Orchestra
- Carlsbad Symphony
- Chattanooga Symphony and Opera
- City Opera of Usti nad Labem
- Czech National Symphony Orchestra
- Czech Virtuosi
- Hradec Králové Philharmonic
- Hungarian Opera Cluj-Napoca
- Indiana University Symphony Orchestra
- Janáček Philharmonic Orchestra Ostrava
- Jefferson Symphony Orchestra
- Kammerphilharmonie der Nationen
- La Sierra University Orchestra
- Louisiana Philharmonic Orchestra
- Mariinsky Theatre Orchestra
- Mobile Opera
- Monroe Symphony Orchestra
- New Orleans Civic Symphony
- New World Symphony
- New York Concert Artists Orchestra
- North Hungarian Symphony Orchestra Miskolc
- Oakland East Bay Symphony
- Opéra Louisiane
- Orchestre de Besançon Franche-Comté
- Orchestre de Chambre de Lausanne
- Orchestre National de Lyon
- Orquesta Sinfónica de Salta
- Prague Philharmonia
- Pilsen Philharmonic
- Pardubice Chamber Philharmonic
- Prague Radio Symphony Orchestra
- Rapides Symphony
- Romanian National Opera, Bucharest
- Saint Joseph Symphony
- Schleswig-Holsteinisches Sinfonieorchester
- Schloss Schönbrunn Orchester
- Slovak National Opera
- Slovak Philharmonic
- Slovak Sinfonietta Zilina
- South Bohemia Chamber Philharmonic
- Stern Orchestra Prague
- Talich Philharmonia Prague
- Vargön Youth Orchestra

== Awards ==
- Second Place 2021, 2018, Third Place 2015, 2016, & 2019 Honorary Mention 2014, The American Prize for Professional Conductors
- Second Prize, Béla Bartók International Opera Conducting Competition, Romania, 2007
- First Prize, Freedman Conducting Competition, U.S.A., 1996
- Honorary Mention & Semi-Finalist, Prague Spring International Conducting Competition, Czech Republic, 1995 & 2000
