= Edward Avery McIlhenny =

American businessman, explorer, and conservationist

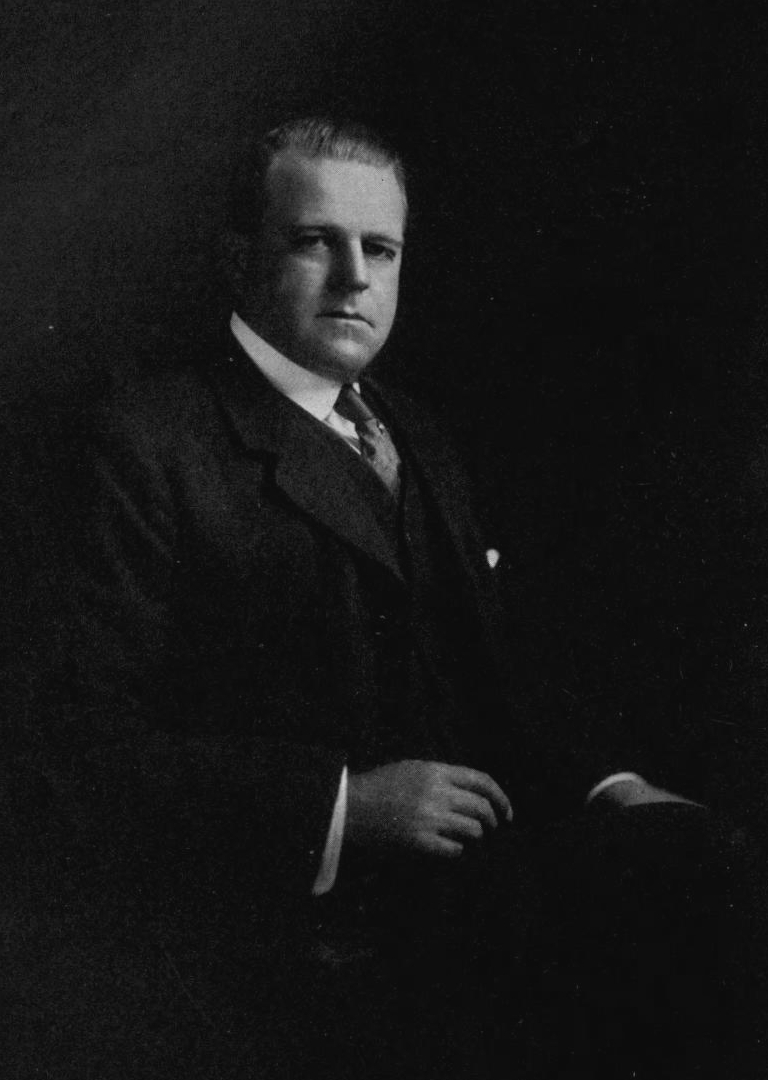
- Edward Avery McIlhenny, portrait from Bird Lore (1916)
- Born: Edward Avery McIlhenny; March 29, 1872; Avery Island, Louisiana
- Died: August 8, 1949 (aged 77); Avery Island
- Occupations: Businessman; explorer; bird bander; conservationist
- Family: Edmund McIlhenny (father); John Avery McIlhenny (brother)

Edward Avery McIlhenny (March 29, 1872 – August 8, 1949), son of Tabasco Company founder Edmund McIlhenny, was an American businessman, explorer, bird bander and conservationist. He established a private wildlife refuge around his family estate on Avery Island and helped in preserving a large coastal marshland in Louisiana as a bird refuge. He also introduced several exotic plants into Jungle Gardens, his private wildlife garden.

McIlhenny is sometimes blamed for the introduction of exotic nutria, also known as coypu, into Louisiana where they are a major ecological problem. Although he was neither the first to introduce their farming in the area nor to release them into the wild, he was a major proponent of the animals' introduction and an avid self-promoter, making him a local legend inextricably linked with the origin of nutria in the state.

== Biography ==
Born in 1872 at Avery Island, Louisiana, where his mother's family had lived since 1818, McIlhenny was educated privately before attending Wyman's Military Academy in Illinois and Dr. Holbrook's Military School in Sing Sing (now Ossining), New York. In 1892, McIlhenny enrolled at Lehigh University, where he joined the Phi Delta Theta fraternity, but he dropped out of school to join Frederick Cook's 1894 Arctic expedition as an ornithologist. The expedition ended when their ship Miranda was wrecked off Greenland. In 1897 he undertook an Arctic expedition to Point Barrow, Alaska, where he leased an old government refuge station, then owned by the Pacific Steam Whaling Company. When a whaling fleet became stranded, McIlhenny housed the ship's officers in the station house and bunked the ordinary seamen in an adjoining structure, including the Japanese adventurer and entrepreneur Jujiro Wada. He provided cotton, originally intended for taxidermic purposes, for the men's bedding and he hunted wildlife to feed the stranded crew.

On his return from the second Arctic expedition, he married Mary Givens Matthews, daughter of William Henry Matthews and Mary Campbell Given, on June 6, 1900, in New Orleans, Louisiana.

== Businessman ==
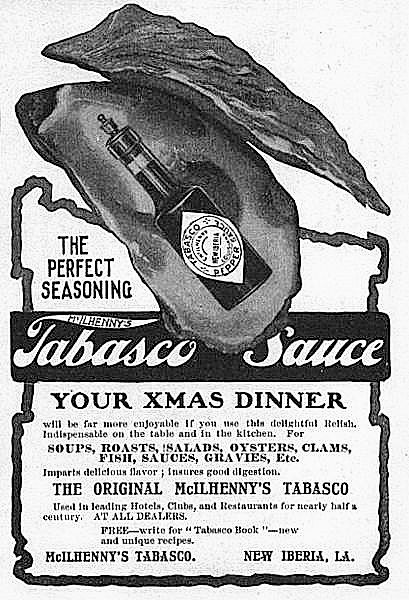
An advertisement for Tabasco pepper sauce from circa 1905, during Edward Avery McIlhenny's tenure as president of McIlhenny Company.

In 1898, Edward's elder brother John enlisted in the First U.S. Volunteer Cavalry, popularly known as the Rough Riders. At that time Edward took over the family business, E. McIlhenny's Son, which produced Tabasco Sauce, the hot-pepper seasoning invented by his father some 30 years previously. Edward renamed the firm McIlhenny Company and began to expand, modernize, and standardized sauce production. He also experimented with new ways of promoting the world-famous product, such as advertising on radio.

In 1927, McIlhenny replaced the cork-topped Tabasco bottles used for nearly six decades with the now-ubiquitous screw-top bottle. He also redesigned the iconic Tabasco diamond logo trademark, largely creating the version known today.

== Nutria farming and release ==
In a venture unrelated to Tabasco sauce, McIlhenny also operated a nutria (Myocastor coypus) farm on Avery Island from 1938 until his death. The nutria introduction began in collaboration with Armand P. Daspit, director of the Louisiana Department of Conservation's Fur and Wild Life Division who approached McIlhenny after reading a bulletin on them from Buenos Aires. Another couple, Susan and Captain H. Conrad Brote began a nutria farm at St. Tammany Parish from around 1933. The captain served on merchant ships running between New Orleans and Buenos Aires. Their farm did well but there were no sales and they let out their nutria even before McIlhenny had begun his operations from locally acquired stock. Another nutria farm was also begun around the same time in St. Bernard Parish from where McIlhenny's first nutria were obtained in 1938. McIlhenny's nutria farm quickly grew too large for their one-acre pen and he was surprised both by their prolific breeding and the difficulties in confining them to their pens. On June 1, 1940, he freed about 20 nutria. In 1945, he released all his nutria, claiming that it would help establish a fur industry in Louisiana.

== Conservation ==
After the first Arctic expedition, he noticed on returning to Avery Island, a great decline in the number of egrets. This led him to conduct experiments in captive breeding. McIlhenny founded the Bird City wildfowl refuge on Avery Island around 1895, which helped to save the snowy egret from extinction. In 1910, McIlhenny and Charles Willis Ward bought 57,000 acres (230 km^{2}) of marshland and later an additional 13,000 acres (53 km^{2}); on November 4, 1911, they dedicated the marsh to the state of Louisiana as a wildlife refuge. McIlhenny persuaded Mrs Russell Sage to purchase 75,000 acres (300 km^{2}) of Marsh Island on July 22, 1912, and the Rockefeller Foundation to acquire an additional 86,000 acres (350 km^{2}) nearby. This created a bird reserve of about 174,663 acres (706.84 km^{2}).

McIlhenny was keen to study the birds on his estate and began bird ringing in 1912, initially using his own bands made of tin and lead on ducks, but he received few recoveries. In February 1916, he began to use bands issued by the American Bird Banding Association. Between 1912 and 1942, he banded 286,743 birds. Based on his ringing studies he came to the conclusion that sex-ratios in ducks were skewed in the wild with males surviving to a greater age than females. Later studies based on McIlhenny's ringing data have yielded considerable information on the movements of black vultures.

In 1941, he wrote on the potential extinction of the ivory-billed woodpecker, noting its presence in his estate on Avery Island and suggesting that the destruction of old growth forests was key to its demise. The subspecies of white-tailed deer on Avery Island was named after McIlhenny as Odocoileus virginianus mcilhennyi by Frederic W. Miller in 1928.

McIlhenny used his 170-acre (0.69 km^{2}) personal estate, known as Jungle Gardens, to propagate both Louisiana-native and imported plant varieties, including azaleas, irises, camellias, papyrus, and bamboo. He wrote numerous academic articles, mainly about birds and reptiles, oversaw the publication in English of two European botanical treatises, and edited Charles L. Jordan's unfinished manuscript The Wild Turkey and Its Hunting (a book often mistakenly attributed to McIlhenny). He supported the equality of women but suggested that there were evolutionary handicaps standing in the way. He also wrote books about alligators (in which he claimed to have shot the longest American alligator 19 feet long), egrets, and African-American gospel music, including:

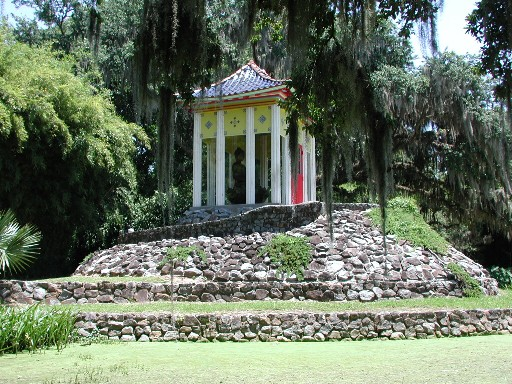
A Buddha temple in Avery Island's Jungle Gardens, the former personal estate of Edward Avery McIlhenny.

- Befo' De War Spirituals: Words and Melodies (1933).
- Bird City (1934).
- The Alligator's Life History (1935).
- The Autobiography of an Egret (1940).

== Death and legacy ==
McIlhenny died in 1949, three years after suffering a debilitating stroke; he is buried on Avery Island. Today, Jungle Gardens and Bird City continue to serve as havens for bird and plant species; they are also popular tourist destinations. Furthermore, the nearly 175,000 acres (710 km^{2}) of coastal marshland he helped to set aside as wildfowl refuges continue to exist as state wildlife areas. McIlhenny's illustrated and written documentation of plant and animal life on Avery Island was donated as a collection to Louisiana State University. The E. A. McIlhenny Collection of natural history books at Louisiana State University is named in his honor.

== See also ==
- John Avery McIlhenny
- Walter S. McIlhenny
