= C. E. Lum =

American politician

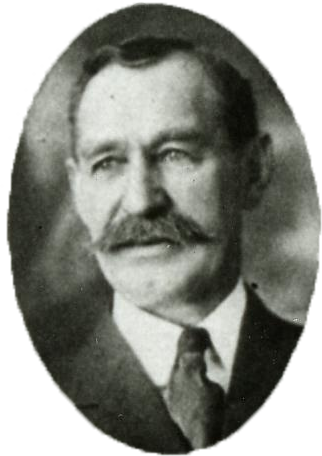
- Lum in 1913

Member of the Washington House of Representatives from the 20th district
- In office 1913–1917 Serving with Walker Moren (1913–1915); William P. Sawyer (1915–1917)
- Preceded by: Walker Moren; Charles W. Chamberlin
- Succeeded by: William P. Sawyer; Ina Phillips Williams

Personal details
- Born: July 4, 1852 Derby, Connecticut, United States
- Died: April 28, 1941 (aged 88) Yakima, Washington, U.S.
- Party: Republican
- Spouse: Adell Colwell (m. 1873; died 1939)
- Children: 5 Children: Charles Edward Jr.; Burton; Howard C.; Morris; "Mrs. George Clark"

Charles E. Lum (July 4, 1852 – April 28, 1941) was an American politician in the state of Washington. A Mississippi River Pilot, Lum moved to Yakima, Washington in 1884, where he was primarily involved in construction, being credited at time of his death with having "built most the early bridges in Yakima County", though for a period he served as deputy sheriff of Yakima County. He represented the 20th legislative district in the Washington House of Representatives from 1913 to 1917. During his time in politics he secured the first appropriation for the Naches Pass highway (Washington State Route 168). At the time of his death he was a member of the Order of Odd Fellows and the Masonic lodge.

He was said to always carry a small American flag.
