= Stuart A. Halsan =

American politician

Member of the Washington House of Representatives from the 20th district
- In office 1983–1985

Member of the Washington State Senate from the 20th district
- In office 1985 – May 10, 1988
- Preceded by: Bill Fuller
- Succeeded by: Gary Odegaard

Personal details
- Born: July 8, 1952 (age 74)
- Party: Democratic

Stuart A. Halsan (born July 8, 1952) is a former member of the Washington House of Representatives and the Washington State Senate.

== Biography ==
Halsan was born on July 8, 1952, in Seattle, Washington. His great-great-grandfather, Oliver A. Caswell, was a member of the Wisconsin State Assembly. Halsan is Lutheran and is a member of the Fraternal Order of Eagles and Moose International.

== Career ==
Halsan was a member of the House of Representatives from 1983 to 1985 and of the Senate from 1985 to 1988. He represented Washington's 20th legislative district in both cases. In 1988, he was a candidate for superior court judge. Halsan is a Democrat.

== See also ==
- The Political Graveyard
