= Swecker =

Swecker is a surname. Notable people with the surname include:

- Chris Swecker (born 1956), American lawyer
- Dan Swecker (1947–2021), American politician
- Susan Swecker (born 1955), American public affairs consultant
