= Rachel Harris (disambiguation) =

Rachel Harris (born 1979) is an Australian freestyle and medley swimmer.

Rachel Harris may also refer to:

- Rachael Harris (born 1968), American actress and comedian
- Rachel Harris (artist) (born 1991), American artist and model
- Rachel Davis Harris (1869–1969), American librarian and activist
- Rachel Harris Larson, American chemist and dental researcher
- Rachel Oakes Preston (1809–1868), Harris, American Seventh Day Baptist

== See also ==
- Rachel Harrison (disambiguation) (born 1966), American visual artist
