= Balize =

Balize may refer to:

- Belize, a country in Central America
- La Balize, Louisiana, a former French fort and settlement near the mouth of the Mississippi River
- The lobe of the Mississippi River Delta, named after the settlement
