= Rachel Harrison =

Rachel Harrison may refer to:

- Rachel Harrison (artist), American visual artist
- Rachel Harrison (computer scientist), British computer scientist
- Rachel Harrison (writer), writer of horror fiction

== See also ==
- Rachel Harris (disambiguation)
