= Neil Amondson =

American politician

Member of the Washington Senate from the 20th district
- In office January 9, 1989 – January 3, 1995
- Preceded by: Gary Odegaard
- Succeeded by: Dan Swecker

Member of the Washington House of Representatives from the 20th district
- In office January 12, 1987 – January 9, 1989
- Preceded by: Glenn Dobbs
- Succeeded by: Rose Bowman

Personal details
- Born: April 8, 1954 (age 72)
- Party: Republican

Neil Amondson (born April 8, 1954) is an American politician who served as a member of the Washington State Senate, representing the 20th district from 1989 to 1995. A member of the Republican Party, he previously served as a member of the Washington House of Representatives from 1987 to 1989.
