= Sheri Everts =

American academic

5th Chancellor of Appalachian State University
- In office July 1, 2014 – April 19, 2024
- Preceded by: Kenneth E. Peacock
- Succeeded by: Heather Norris

Personal details
- Born: Nebraska
- Education: University of Nebraska–Lincoln (BA, MA, EdD)

Sheri Noren Everts is an American academic and educator. She served as the chancellor of Appalachian State University in North Carolina until her resignation on April 19, 2024.

== Early life and education ==
Born and raised in Nebraska, Everts attended elementary school in a one-room schoolhouse. She completed her undergraduate education at the University of Nebraska–Lincoln, graduating with a Bachelor of Arts degree in English in 1980. She worked as a high school English teacher in Nebraska and Kansas for several years, later returning to UNL to complete a Master of Arts in literacy education and Doctor of Education.

== Career ==
In 1994, Everts joined the University of Nebraska Omaha as an assistant professor in the Department of Teacher Education. She was made assistant vice-chancellor for academic and student affairs in 2000, associate vice-president in 2003, and interim senior vice-chancellor in 2006. Everts left UNO in 2008 to become provost and vice-president for academic affairs at Illinois State University. She served as interim president from May to August 2013, following the resignation of Alvin Bowman. In March 2014, Everts was announced as the new chancellor of Appalachian State University. She took office in July 2014, and was formally installed April 2015 as the university's first female chancellor.

Under Everts' leadership, enrollment at Appalachian State University grew to more than 21,000 students, which included the most diverse student body to date in fall 2023, with 19% of the total population being racially and/or ethnically underrepresented students. The university has increased its underrepresented students by 77% and first-year underrepresented students by 117% since 2014, the beginning of Everts' tenure. For the university's 2022-23 undergraduate population, about one-third are first-generation students and nearly one-third are students from rural populations.

In November 2021, Everts announced the establishment of the App State Hickory Campus, which opened to students on Aug. 21, 2023. Until Nov. 19, 2021, when the university purchased the former Corning Optical Communications building, Hickory was the largest metropolitan area in North Carolina that did not have a major, public university campus.

Everts also opened Appalachian State University's Academy at Middle Fork in Walkertown, North Carolina, in 2018, which serves approximately 300 K-5 students with research-based practices. The university opened its second lab school, the App State Academy at Elkin, in 2022, which serves approximately 100 students in second through fourth grades, and is the only UNC System institution to operate two laboratory school programs.

Since joining Appalachian State University in 2014, Everts increased faculty salaries, with merit-based salary increases provided in 2019 through a reallocation of state funds and across-the-board salary increase for full-time faculty and staff in the 2021–22 and 2022-23 fiscal years.

Through the university's Appalachian Energy Summit, UNC System campuses had, by 2023, avoided $1.75 billion in utility costs. In early 2022, the university's percentage of electricity supplied from renewable energy sources increased from 2% to 18%, an advancement made possible through hydroelectric and solar power purchases, and purchased electricity for the Levine Hall of Health Sciences, the university's largest building on its Boone campus, was converted to 100% solar.

In 2020, Everts established the Chancellor's Awards for Inclusive Excellence. The inaugural award honorees included university students, faculty and staff, as well as a local community member.

Everts' two-year term as president of the NCSS Division I Sun Belt Conference, in which 17 of App State's 17 varsity sports teams compete, began July 1, 2023. For the preceding two years, she served as vice president of the conference.

On April 15, 2024, Everts announced her resignation as Chancellor of App State effective April 19 citing personal health challenges.

== Criticism ==
On June 8, 2015, Everts removed Vice Chancellor for Student Development (later renamed Vice Chancellor for Student Affairs) Cindy Wallace from her role after 12 years to "initiate a leadership change." Several students and community members voiced concern about the abrupt nature of Wallace's removal and a perceived pattern of Everts removing University leaders with little notice.

On August 17, 2020, the Appalachian State Faculty Senate voted no confidence in Everts' leadership primarily due to concerns about teaching during the COVID-19 pandemic. Appalachian State was one of the largest UNC System schools to hold in-person classes throughout 2020, with 30 percent in-person classes, 30 percent hybrid classes and 40 percent remote/online classes.

In Spring of 2024, Everts faced mounting criticism surrounding her renaming of Pride Week to Spring Week, as well as discussions around firing and demoting of LGBT+ professors and faculty. This was exacerbated by a poorly received university response and the removal of the University's free-expression tunnels. Towards the end of Everts' tenure, several protests surfaced around the treatment of LGBT+ students and faculty as well as issues with the renovation of Wey Hall which houses the University's art department.
