= Heather Hulburt Norris =

American academic

6th Chancellor of Appalachian State University
- Incumbent
- Assumed office March 1, 2025; Interim: April 19, 2024 – March 1, 2025
- Preceded by: Sheri Everts

Personal details
- Education: James Madison University (BBA), Penn. State (M.S., PhD)

Heather Hulburt Norris is an American academic and educator who has served as the chancellor of Appalachian State University in North Carolina since March 1, 2025. She previously held the position in an interim capacity beginning in April 2024.

== Early life and education ==
Norris began her higher education at James Madison University, where she earned a Bachelor of Business Administration. She later completed a Master of Science in Finance and a Ph.D. at Pennsylvania State University. After graduating, Norris served as an assistant professor of finance at Bowling Green State University from 1995 to 1997 and at West Virginia University from 1997 to 2003. She also held a position as a visiting assistant professor of finance at Pennsylvania State University from 2000 to 2001.

== Appalachian State University career ==
In 2003, Norris joined Appalachian State University as an assistant professor in the Walker College of Business’ Department of Finance, Banking and Insurance. She became assistant dean for undergraduate programs in 2005 and interim dean in 2015. She became the seventh dean of the Walker College of Business in 2016. During her tenure, the college grew its fundraising by nearly 70%, securing three endowed professorships and undergoing a major remodeling.

She became provost and executive vice chancellor on an interim basis in 2020 and fully in 2021.

On April 19, 2024, University of North Carolina system president Peter Hans announced her appointment as interim chancellor, succeeding Sheri Everts. While Norris was serving as interim chancellor, Appalachian State University earned an R2 Carnegie Classification, indicating high research activity and doctoral degree production.

During her tenure as interim chancellor, Norris also led the university’s response to Hurricane Helene, which struck Boone, North Carolina, the home of Appalachian State University, in late September 2024. The university canceled classes for approximately three weeks due to the storm’s impact. UNC System President Peter Hans described Norris as a “steady and healing presence through the very difficult months” following the storm.

On February 27, 2025, Norris was named the permanent chancellor of Appalachian State University, with her appointment taking effect on March 1, 2025.

== Personal life ==
Norris and her husband, Robert, a 1987 Appalachian State University alumnus and former staff member at Appalachian State University, have one daughter, Emma.
