= Gary Odegaard =

American politician

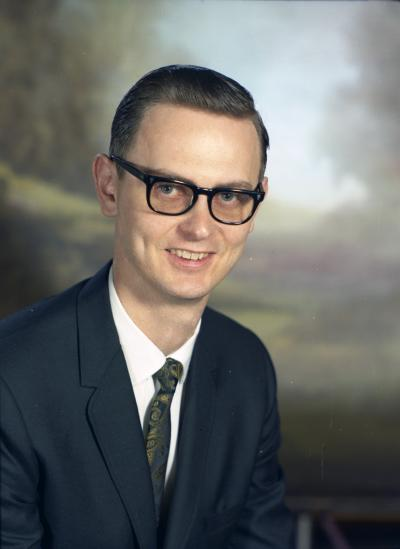
- Odegaard in 1969

Member of the Washington Senate from the 20th district
- In office June 2, 1988 – January 9, 1989
- Preceded by: Joe Chytil
- Succeeded by: Leonard E. “Len” Tabor
- In office January 13, 1969 – June 30, 1980
- Preceded by: Stuart A. “Stu” Halsan
- Succeeded by: Neil Amondson

Personal details
- Born: February 28, 1940 (age 86) Bellingham, Washington, U.S.
- Party: Democratic
- Spouse: Kay

Gary M. Odegaard (born February 28, 1940) is an American former politician in the state of Washington. He served the 20th district from 1969 to 1980.
