= Dan Swecker =

American politician (1947–2021)

Member of the Washington Senate from the 20th district
- In office January 5, 1995 – January 14, 2013
- Preceded by: Neil Amondson
- Succeeded by: John Braun

Personal details
- Born: Daniel Peter Swecker; February 28, 1947 Bozeman, Montana, U.S.
- Died: September 1, 2021 (aged 74) Rochester, Washington, U.S.
- Party: Republican
- Spouse: Debby Swecker
- Children: 4
- Education: Tacoma Community College (AA); Evergreen State College (BA)

Military service
- Allegiance: United States
- Branch/service: United States Army
- Years of service: 1966–1969

Daniel Peter Swecker (February 28, 1947 – September 1, 2021) was an American farmer, military officer, and politician.

== Biography ==
He served in the Washington State Senate from the 20th district from 1995 to 2013. He was a Republican.

Swecker died on September 1, 2021, at age 74.
