= Ina Phillips Williams =

Washington State politician

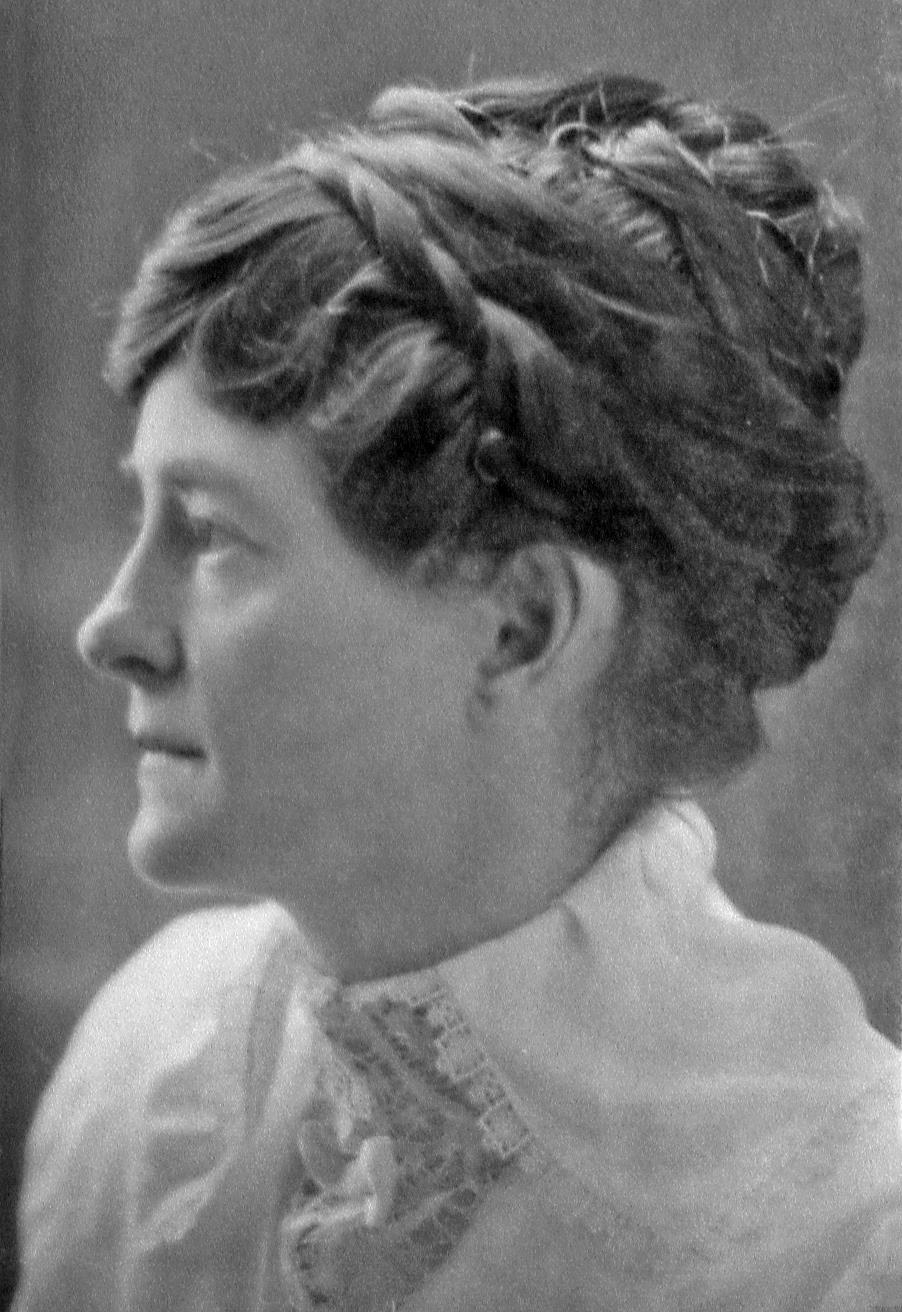
- Williams c. 1917

Member of the Washington House of Representatives from the 20th district
- In office January 8, 1917 – January 13, 1919 Serving with William P. Sawyer
- Preceded by: C. E. Lum; William P. Sawyer
- Succeeded by: William P. Sawyer; Howard C. Lucas

Personal details
- Born: Ina May Phillips; February 24, 1876 Tuscumbia, Missouri, U.S.
- Died: March 23, 1934 (aged 58) Yakima, Washington, U.S.
- Party: Republican
- Spouse: Wallis B. Williams (orchardist)
- Education: Washington State Normal School at Ellensburg, Washington (now Central Washington University) (graduated)
- Occupation: Teacher

Ina Phillips Williams (February 24, 1876 – March 23, 1934) was an American politician who served as a member of the Washington House of Representatives from 1917 to 1919. She represented Washington's 20th legislative district as a Republican.

== Early life and education ==
Williams was born Ina May Phillips in Tuscumbia, Missouri on February 24, 1876. When she was 10, she was orphaned and moved with her siblings to live with an uncle in Prosser, Washington. By the age of 15, she had begun teaching school.

In 1897, at the age of 20 or 21, she married Wallis B. Williams, a Yakima Valley orchardist. The 1910 census recorded five children (daughters aged 11, 8, 6, and 4, and a one-year-old son), as well as a servant. Wallis is listed as a milling company manager.

== Political career ==
Williams won election to the state House of Representatives and represented the 20th District as a Republican for one term, from 1917 to 1919.

=== Third party politics ===
Before and after finding electoral success as a Republican, Williams was engaged in liberal third party politics. She was a delegate for Theodore Roosevelt to the 1912 Progressive National Convention. She also served on the national executive committee of the Committee of 48, a liberal political association founded in 1919, with the ultimately unsuccessful hope of launching a third political party in opposition to increasingly conservative Republican and Democratic politics.

In August, 1920, she represented the Farmer-Labor Party in a "triangular political discussion" alongside congressional candidate E.K. Brown (representing the Republicans) and the honorable J.J. Miller representing the Democrats. The event in Wapato drew "an immense crowd from all parts of Yakima County."

== Personal life ==
Williams was an enthusiastic gardener, even helping found gardening clubs around the Yakima Valley. She also served as president of the Yakima Woman's Century Club, an organization founded in 1894 as the Woman's Club that furthered women's civic, social, and literary engagement.

The 1920 census lists Wallis as a fruit farmer. Neither the 1910 nor 1920 census lists an occupation for Ina, and her death certificate says she was a housewife for 30 years.

== Death and legacy ==
Williams died of metastatic breast cancer on March 23, 1934, at the age of 58. She is buried at Tahoma Cemetery in Yakima.

== See also ==
- 1912 Progressive National Convention
- Committee of 48
