= Hot Hot Hot (meme) =

2005 promotional video about Appalachian State University

"Hot Hot Hot" is the informal title of a promotional video about Appalachian State University that became an internet phenomenon in late 2005.

== Background ==
In 2004 a committee for the Appalachian Family Caravan tour created a promotional video shown throughout the region by Chancellor Kenneth E. Peacock. The tour began September 27, 2004 and included areas where Appalachian State has a strong alumni base. The tour planned to make stops in Atlanta, Miami and Tampa.

Peacock described the video's role in promotion:

It was used primarily for the [Appalachian] Caravan, taking it out with us on the road show and show that Appalachian is a great institution and it's hot in many ways, and that was part of the whole show. So in order to understand fully that video, you almost had to be at one of those Caravan events. I would ask the audience to say, 'You know why this is the case? It's because Appalachian, my friends, is …' and they would respond, 'Hot.' I think they took it off the Web site because, without it being a Caravan event, it's confusing. People don't really understand what the message is with the song. It was all done in fun, to go and energize our alumni and say here are some things that are happening on campus, holding up the highlights of faculty, programs, accomplishments of students, and say 'You know why this is possible? It's because Appalachian is hot.' It builds all around that whole theme.

== The video ==
This screenshot illustrates the format of the video, whose quality was widely panned. The format of the video is a slide show of pictures that one BoingBoing commentator described as "incredibly lame imagery." accompanied by lyrics at the bottom of the screen.

The two-minute-and-17-second slide show of images around campus included an original song with lyrics such as these from the chorus:

Hot hot hot,
Hot hot hot.
Appalachian is hot hot hot!
Come and let us show you what we've got.
Come and let us show you why we're hot hot hot!

== Response ==
The extensive use of puffery and the retro juxtaposition of music and PowerPoint style still imagery claiming that the school is "hot hot hot" inadvertently play into the stereotype that people from Appalachia are unsophisticated and out of touch.

A December 2004 Faculty meeting noted: "Concern has been expressed about the style/public image implied by the 'Faculty Caravan' video on ASU's webpage that goes with the song 'Hot Hot Hot.'"

The video began circulating widely in 2005. For many viewers, the video provided a first impression of Appalachian State University.

The video was featured on VH1's Web Junk 20 program in early 2006, where it was named to the No. 5 spot on the top 20 countdown of stupidest or funny Internet videos.

A January 26 editorial in the Appalachian State student newspaper criticized the video, calling it "so ridiculously tacky one cannot help but laugh when watching it," adding, "The jingle is horrible, the lyrics are absurd and the pictures make Appalachian seem like an institution stuck in the 1970s."

The video was not an official project and in the wake of the response is no longer used by the university. Lorin Baumhover, Chief of Staff for the Office of the Chancellor at Appalachian State, told NPR, "It's horrible," claiming the video was an inside joke for alumni. "I wish someone could put a stake through it," he said.

The video had somewhat of a resurrection on the Internet after it was revealed that Miss Teen South Carolina Caitlin Upton planned to attend Appalachian State. She achieved dubious Internet fame herself for providing a rambling answer on August 24, 2007, to a Miss Teen USA pageant question about why Americans cannot locate the U.S. on a world map. Two weeks later, the video achieved wide circulation among sports fans following the widely covered 2007 Appalachian State vs. Michigan football game.
