= Emily E. Edwards =

American physicist

- Education: Appalachian State University (BS); University of Maryland (MS, PhD)
- Known for: The Quantum Atlas; Fellow of the American Physical Society
- Scientific career
- Workplaces: University of Maryland; Illinois Quantum Information Science and Technology Center

Emily E. Edwards is an American physicist specializing in physics education and outreach concerning quantum mechanics. She was the executive director of the Illinois Quantum Information Science and Technology Center (IQUIST) at the University of Illinois Urbana–Champaign, and co-leader of the National Q-12 Education Partnership, a joint project of the White House Office of Science and Technology Policy and the National Science Foundation. As of 2025 she is also affiliated with Duke University.

== Education and career ==
Edwards is a 2002 graduate of Appalachian State University with a bachelor's degree in physics and chemistry. She then became a graduate student at the University of Maryland, College Park, where she earned a master's degree in chemical physics in 2008 and completed her Ph.D. in physics in 2009.

After completing her Ph.D., she conducted postdoctoral research at the University of Maryland's Joint Quantum Institute on quantum storage using ion traps. She later became the director of communications and outreach for the institute before moving to the Illinois Quantum Information Science and Technology Center, where she previously served as its managing director. In 2023, she testified before U.S. Congress on quantum technology education, particularly for K-12 students.

== Recognition ==
Edwards was named as a Fellow of the American Physical Society (APS) in 2022, after a nomination from the APS Forum on Outreach and Engaging the Public, "for creating innovative communication and outreach programs in quantum physics that broaden participation and for leadership in advancing informal quantum information science education for early learners".
