= Rose Bowman =

American politician (1945–2017)

Member of the Washington House of Representatives
- In office 1989–1993

Personal details
- Born: February 14, 1945 Woodward, Oklahoma
- Died: May 2, 2017 (aged 72) Centralia, Washington
- Party: Republican

Rose Anna Bowman (née Olin; February 14, 1945 – May 2, 2017) was an American politician. She was a Republican, representing Washington's 20th legislative district which included all of Lewis County and the southwest portion of Thurston County, from 1989 to 1993.

Bowman was born in Woodward, Oklahoma. She also served as Lewis County Treasurer.
