= Pilottown, Louisiana =

Pilottown
- Unincorporated community
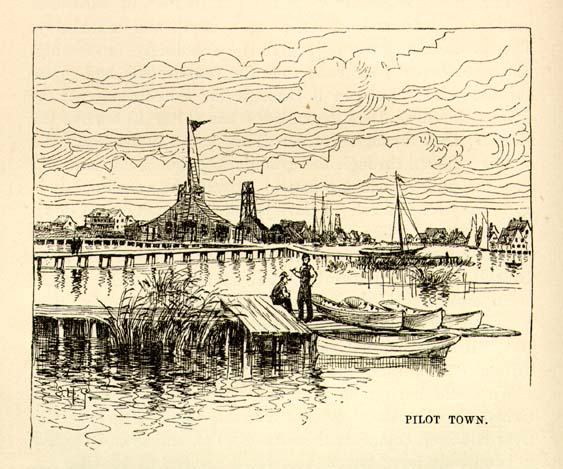
- Pilottown in the 1880s

- Location of Pilottown in Louisiana
- Coordinates: 29°10′54″N 89°15′27″W
- Country: United States
- State: Louisiana
- Parish: Plaquemines

Area
  - Total: 7.2 sq mi (19 km^{2})
  - Land: 5.0 sq mi (13 km^{2})
  - Water: 2.2 sq mi (5.7 km^{2})
- Elevation: 3 ft (0.91 m)

Population (2020)
  - Total: 0
  - Density: 0.0/sq mi (0.0/km^{2})
- Time zone: UTC-6 (CST)
  - Summer (DST): UTC-5 (CDT)
- ZIP code: 70081 (closed)
- Area code: 504

Pilottown (or Pilot Town) is an unincorporated community and ghost town in Plaquemines Parish, Louisiana, United States. It serves as a base for river pilots to guide ships across the bar and up and down the Mississippi River. As of 2020, there is no permanent residential population in the community.

In the 18th and 19th centuries, the French settlement and fort that preceded Pilottown near the mouth of the Mississippi was known as La Balize, a name that meant "seamark" in French. La Balize was located about 10 miles (16 km) downriver from Pilottown.

== History ==
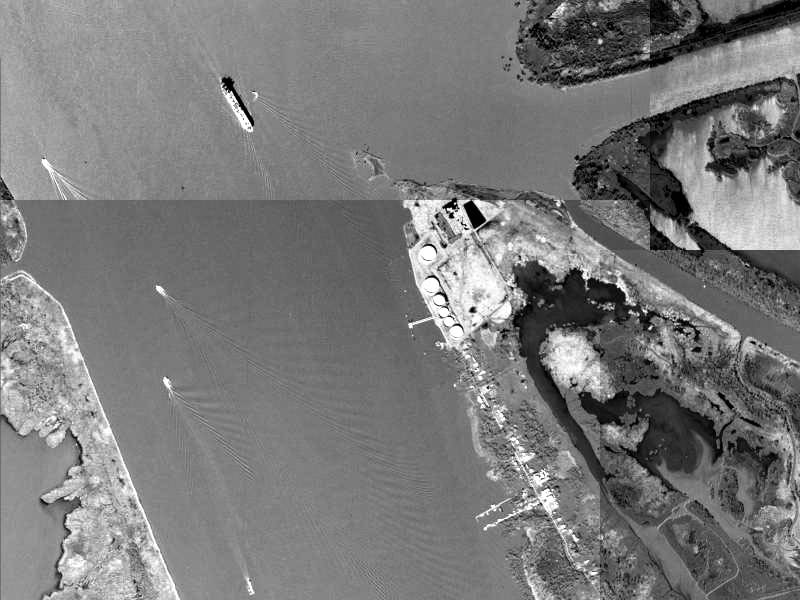
Pilottown, Louisiana, as ships pass by on the Mississippi

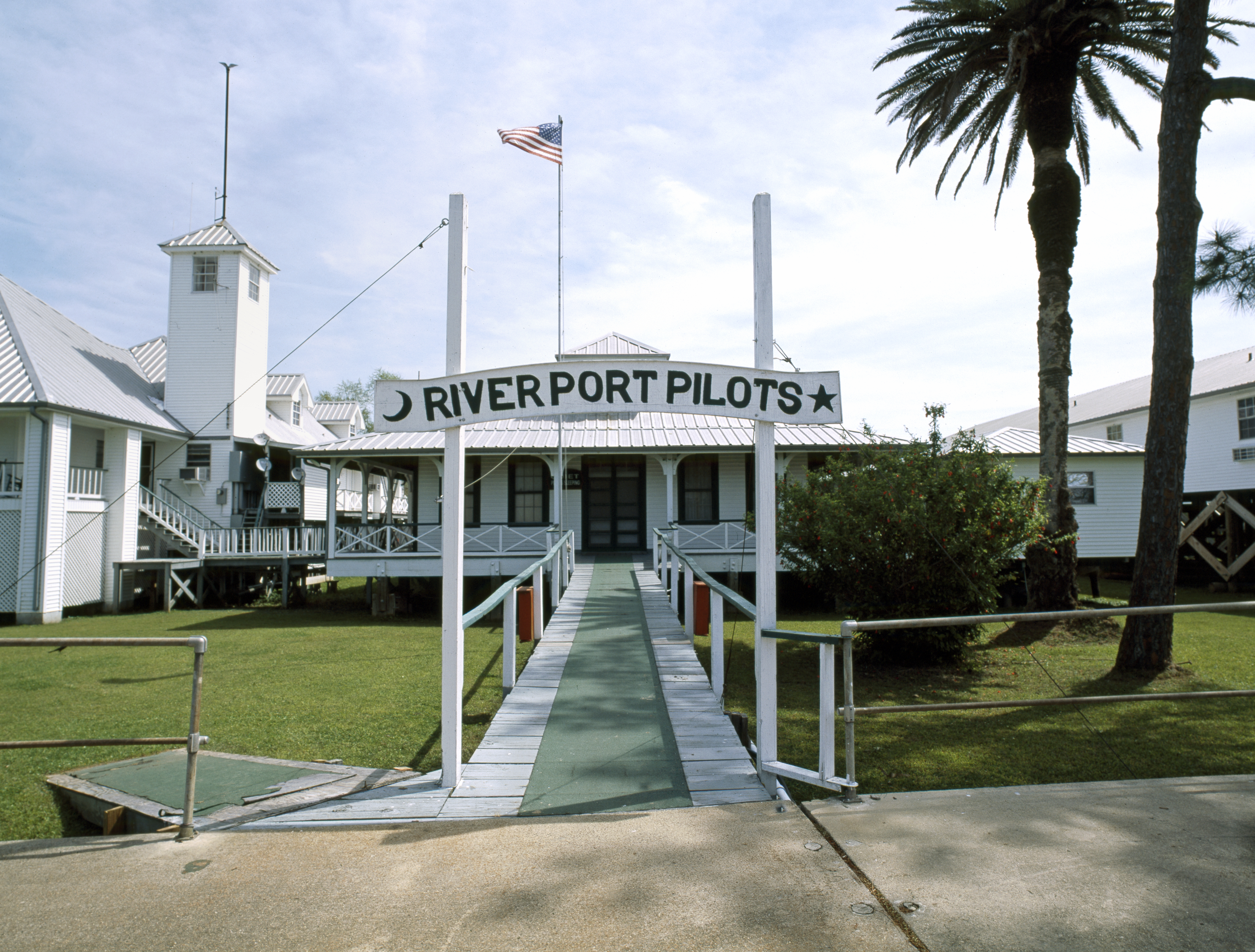
Before Katrina

Pilottown was constructed and settled after September 1860 in its current location. It replaced the earlier village of La Balize, that had been founded more than 160 years earlier downriver. After the hurricane of September 14–15, 1860, blew its buildings down and destroyed the area in a storm surge, La Balize was finally abandoned. The main river passage was moved to the Southwest Pass, because of its deeper water. The Mississippi River pilots built their new settlement upriver above Head of Passes. They named it Pilottown.

The first French settlers had built a crude fort and dwellings for La Balize near the mouth of the Mississippi in 1699. The name meant "seamark", and the French built a 62-foot-high (19 m) wooden pyramidal structure in 1721 to help guide ships on the Mississippi River and at its shifting delta. This was where river pilots came to live.

Pilottown is built on piers in swampy ground on the East Bank of the lower Mississippi River, about 85 miles (137 km) downriver from New Orleans (65 miles or 105 kilometres) and about 10 miles (16 km) south of Venice, Louisiana. Pilottown is located a few miles above Head of Passes, the point considered to be the mouth of the Mississippi River. Below there the River splits into multiple branches. This is part of the active delta front that has, over time, built up the larger Mississippi River Delta.

Pilottown serves as a temporary home for members of the Crescent River Port Pilots' Association and as a base for oil exploration. Although the captain is always responsible for his ship, all oceangoing ships must take a pilot on board when entering the Mississippi River system. The river has shifting passages and sand bars that make the journey difficult, especially given the tides and the powerful current downriver. The Associated Branch Pilots supplies river pilots for ships traveling between the Gulf of Mexico and Pilottown. The Crescent River Port Pilots' Association supplies river pilots between Pilottown and New Orleans, Louisiana, and the New Orleans-Baton Rouge Steamship Pilots Association supplies pilots for ships that are bound for Baton Rouge, Louisiana.

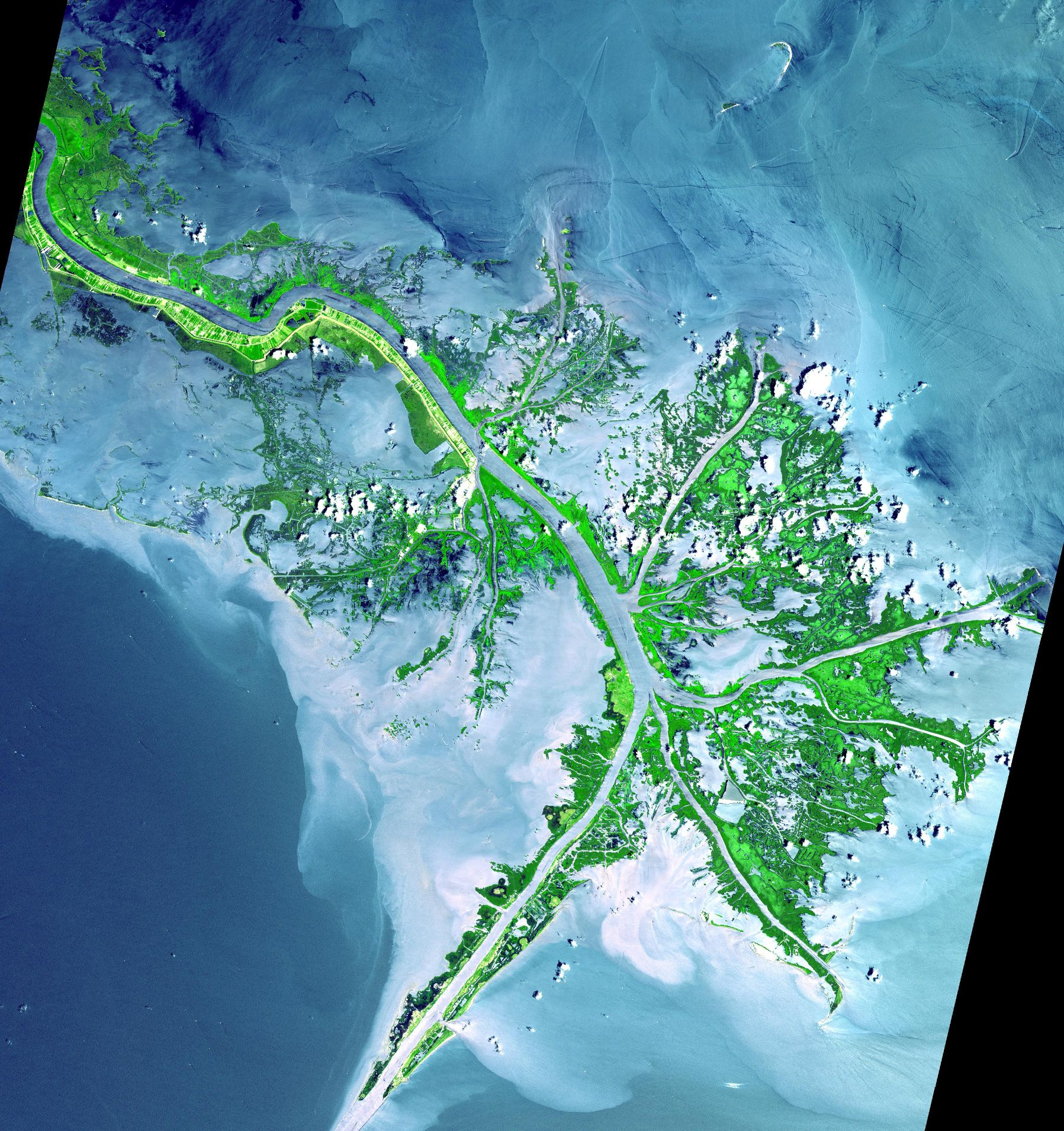
The active front of the Mississippi Delta. Pilottown is located just north of the main fork.

Pilottown consists of a few buildings, including temporary housing for river pilots and a weather station, and some large oil tanks. Because Pilottown is only a few feet above river level, a raised concrete walkway connects these buildings and runs the length of the island, to provide some footing in flood conditions.

Pilottown is accessible only by water or by helicopter. In the 19th and early 20th century many fishermen, pilots and their families lived here, but now most make their residence in larger communities upriver. The pilots stay in temporary quarters in Pilottown only while working. The peak population was probably reached in the 1860s, when La Balize had a population of some 800 people.

Pilottown no longer has any permanent residents; the remaining few in 2005 did not return after Hurricane Katrina. The Crescent River Port Pilots still maintain headquarters but pilots do not reside full-time. Pilottown is not listed in the United States census figures. Pilottown's one-room school was closed in the 1970s. Although Pilottown still has its own zip code of 70081, the Pilottown Post Office was closed when the US Postal Service could not find a postmaster willing to live in the village.

=== Hurricane Katrina ===
Hurricane Katrina struck southern Louisiana near Pilottown, inflicting heavy damage on nearly every structure. The headquarters of the Associated Branch Pilots, located in Pilottown for over 100 years, was pushed backward off its foundation, leading the pilots to decide against rebuilding in Pilottown. They have since relocated 10 miles upriver to Venice. The Crescent River Port Pilots decided to remain in Pilottown to provide pilotage on their route which begins at Pilottown.
