= Appalachian State University =

Public university in Boone, North Carolina, US

Coordinates: 36°12′50″N 81°40′43″W

- Former name: List: Watauga Academy (1899–1903) Appalachian Training School for Teachers (1903–1925) Appalachian State Normal School (1925–1929) Appalachian State Teachers College (1929–1967)
- Motto: Esse quam videri (Latin)
- Motto in English: "To Be, Rather Than To Seem"
- Type: Public research university
- Established: 1899; 127 years ago (as Watauga Academy)
- Parent institution: University of North Carolina
- Accreditation: SACS
- Academic affiliations: ORAU
- Endowment: $192 million (2025)
- Chancellor: Heather Hulburt Norris
- Students: 21,798 (2025)
- Location: Boone, North Carolina, United States
- Campus: Distant town, 1,300 acres (5.3 km^{2})
- Other campuses: Hickory
- Newspaper: The Appalachian
- Colors: Black and gold
- Nickname: Mountaineers
- Sporting affiliations: NCAA Division I FBS – Sun Belt; MAC; SoCon
- Mascot: Yosef
- Website: appstate.edu

Appalachian State University (/ˌæpəˈlætʃən/ (Note: The pronunciation of "Appalachian" in a Southern U.S. dialect is provided. For further information on pronunciation, please view the Appalachian Mountains article.)), or App State, is a public research university in Boone, North Carolina, United States. It was founded as a teachers' college in 1899 by brothers B. B. and D. D. Dougherty and the latter's wife, Lillie Shull Dougherty. The university expanded to include other programs in 1967 and joined the University of North Carolina System in 1971. It is classified as "R2: High Research Spending and Doctorate Production" for research activity.

The university enrolls more than 21,500 students. It offers more than 150 bachelor's degrees and 70 graduate degree programs, including two doctoral programs. The university has eight colleges: the College of Arts and Sciences, the Walker College of Business, the Reich College of Education, the College of Fine and Applied Arts, the Beaver College of Health Sciences, the Honors College, the Hayes School of Music, and University College. It opened an additional campus in Hickory in 2023.

The Athletic Teams compete in the Sun Belt Conference, except for a few sports that compete in the Southern Conference, such as wrestling. The university's team name is the Mountaineers.

== History ==
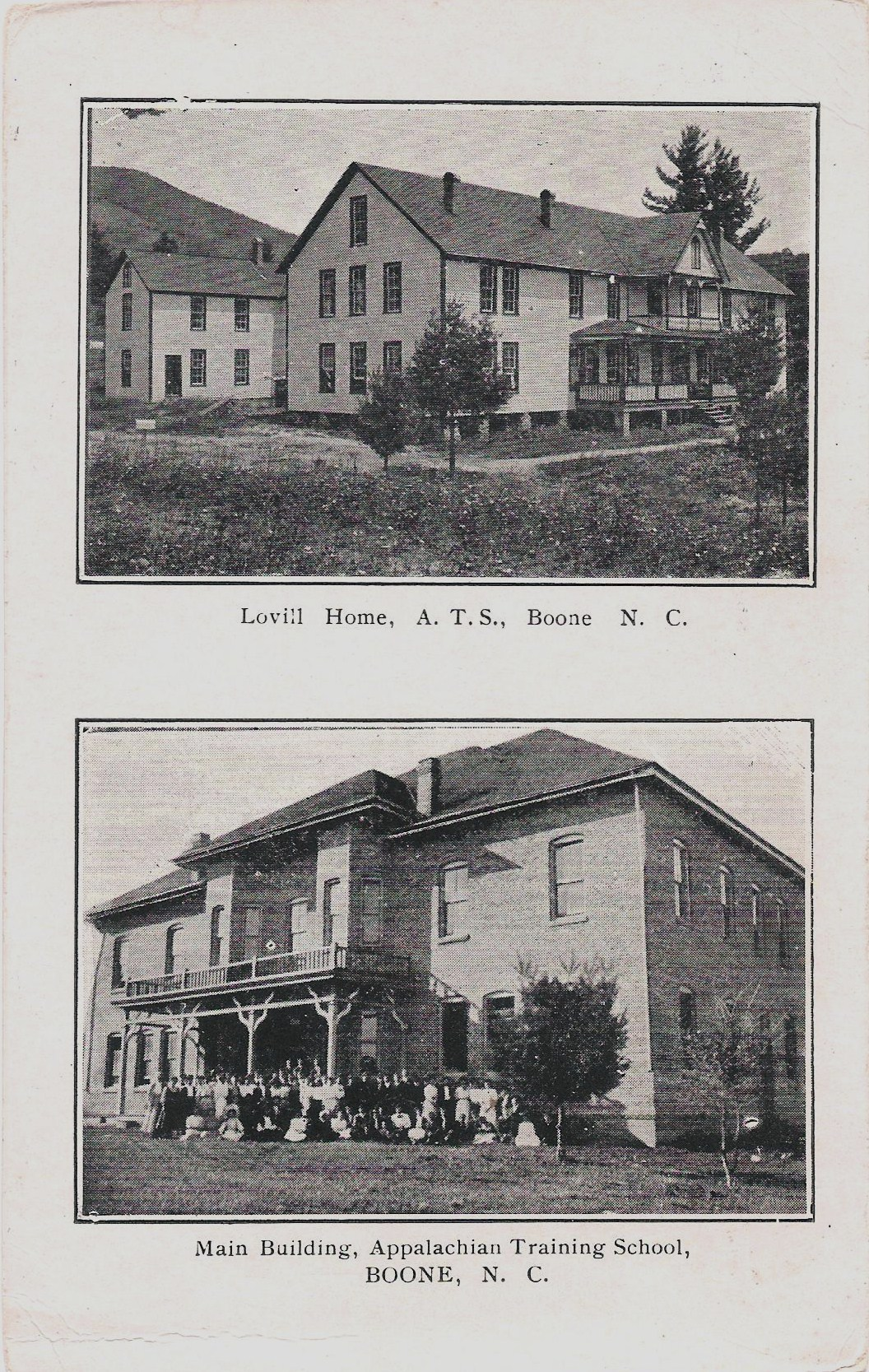
Lowell Home (above) and main building of Appalachian Training School

Appalachian State University began in 1899 when a group of residents in Watauga County, under the leadership of Blanford B. Dougherty and his brother Dauphin D. Dougherty, began a movement to educate teachers in northwestern North Carolina. Land was donated by Daniel B. Dougherty, father of the leaders in the enterprise, and J. F. Hardin. On this site a wood-frame building, costing $1,000, was erected by contributions from citizens of the town and county. In the fall of 1899, the Dougherty brothers, acting as co-principals, began the school, which was then called "Watauga Academy". The first year saw 53 students enrolled in three grades. D. D. Dougherty's wife, Lillie Shull Dougherty, taught classes and contributed to administrative decisions.

In 1903, after interest in the school had spread to adjoining counties, D. D. Dougherty was convinced the state would fund institutions established to train teachers. He traveled to Raleigh after drafting a bill. W. C. Newland of Caldwell County introduced the bill in the North Carolina Legislature to make this a state school, with an appropriation for maintenance and for building. E. F. Lovill of Watauga County, R. B. White of Franklin County, Clyde Hoey of Cleveland County, and E. J. Justice of McDowell County spoke in favor of the measure. On March 9, 1903, the bill became law, and the "Appalachian Training School for Teachers" was established. The school opened on October 5, 1903, with $2,000 from the state and 325 students.

For 22 years, there was a period of steady growth, academic development, and service to the state. In 1925, the legislature changed the name to the "Appalachian State Normal School" and appropriated additional funding for maintenance and permanent improvement. In 1929, the school became a four-year degree granting institution and was renamed "Appalachian State Teachers College". Over 1,300 students were enrolled in degree programs offered for primary grades education, physical education, math, English, science, and history.

Appalachian attained national standards by becoming accredited by the American Association for Teacher Education in 1939, and the Southern Association of Colleges and Schools in 1942. In 1948 a graduate school was formed. Dr. Dougherty retired in 1955 after 56 years of serving the school. J. D. Rankin became interim president until William H. Plemmons was installed. Plemmons led from 1955 to 1969, and his administration oversaw the addition of new buildings as the campus expanded and enrollment grew to nearly 5,000 students.

Appalachian was transformed from a single-purpose teachers' college into a multipurpose regional university and Appalachian State Teacher's College became Appalachian State University in 1967. Growth continued in the 1970s to around 9,500 students and 550 faculty. Afterward, four degree-granting undergraduate colleges were created: Arts and Sciences, Business, Fine and Applied Arts, and Education. Herbert Wey succeeded Plemmons as president in 1969 and was named chancellor in 1971. In 1972, Appalachian State became part of the University of North Carolina system.

== Campus ==
Located in the Blue Ridge Mountains of northwestern North Carolina, Appalachian State University has one of the highest elevations of any U.S. university east of the Mississippi River, at 3,333 feet (1,016 m). Its main campus is in downtown Boone, a town of 19,092 compared to an ASU enrollment of 21,253 students. The campus encompasses 1,300 acres (5.3 km^{2}), including a main campus of 410 acres (1.7 km^{2}) with 20 residence halls, 3 main dining facilities, 30 academic buildings, and 11 recreation/athletic facilities.

The center of campus is nicknamed Sanford Mall, an open grassy quad between the student union, dining halls, and library. Sanford Hall, on the mall's edge, is named for Terry Sanford, a former governor of the state. Rivers Street, a thoroughfare for town and university traffic, essentially divides the campus into east and west sections with tunnels and a pedestrian bridge connecting the two halves. The eastern half includes Sanford Mall, Plemmons Student Union, Central Dining Hall, and Carol Grotnes Belk Library and Information Commons, along with two residence hall neighborhoods, East Everest, and Durham Neighborhood. The west side has Trivette Dining Hall, the Student Recreation Center (or SRC), the Quinn Recreation Center, Kidd Brewer Stadium, and Stadium Side, Mountain Side and Pond Side residence hall neighborhoods. At the north end, Bodenheimer Drive crosses over Rivers Street and leads to Appalachian Heights (an apartment-style residence hall), Mountaineer Hall, the Chancellor's House, the Living Learning Center, and Jim and Bettie Smith Stadium. The George M. Holmes Convocation Center at Rivers Street's south end is the gateway and entrance to campus.

=== Turchin Center for the Visual Arts ===
The Turchin Center for the Visual Arts on the edge of main campus is the university's visual art center. It is the largest visual arts center in northwestern North Carolina, eastern Tennessee, and southwestern Virginia. It displays rotating exhibits indoors and outdoors, some culturally specific to the Appalachians, and offers community outreach programs through art courses. It opened in 2003. The newly renovated Schaefer Center for the Performing Arts, a 1,635-seat performance venue, hosts artists from around the world.

=== Appalachian State University Preserve ===
The Appalachian State University Nature Preserve consists of 67 acres of protected woodlands near the heart of campus. The land was dedicated as a State Natural Area in 1999 through the North Carolina Nature Preserves Act, and serves as an outdoor classroom for students and faculty. The preserve's primary purpose is to enable conservation, education, and recreation for students, staff, and faculty.

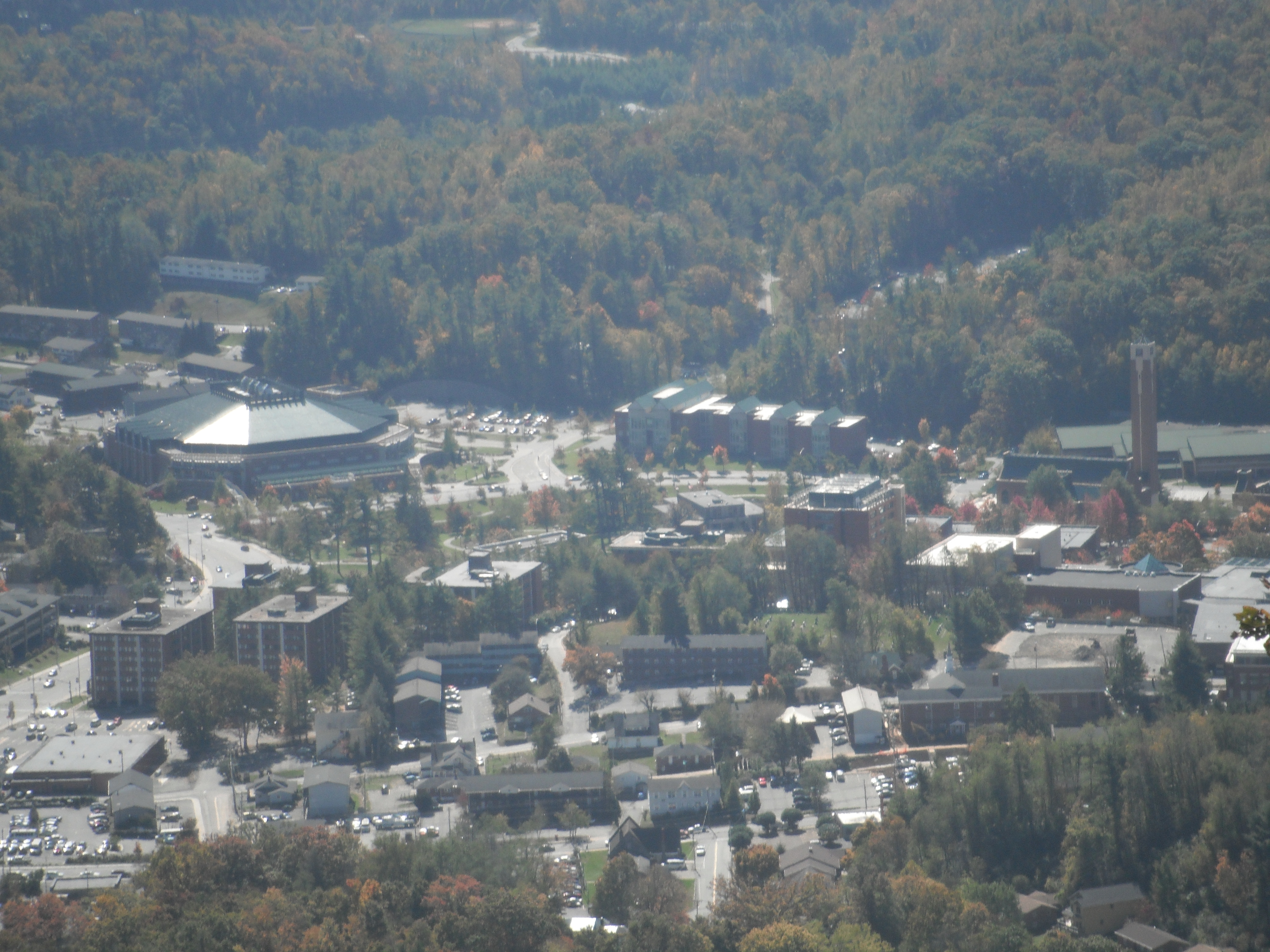
The campus seen from the summit of Howard Knob

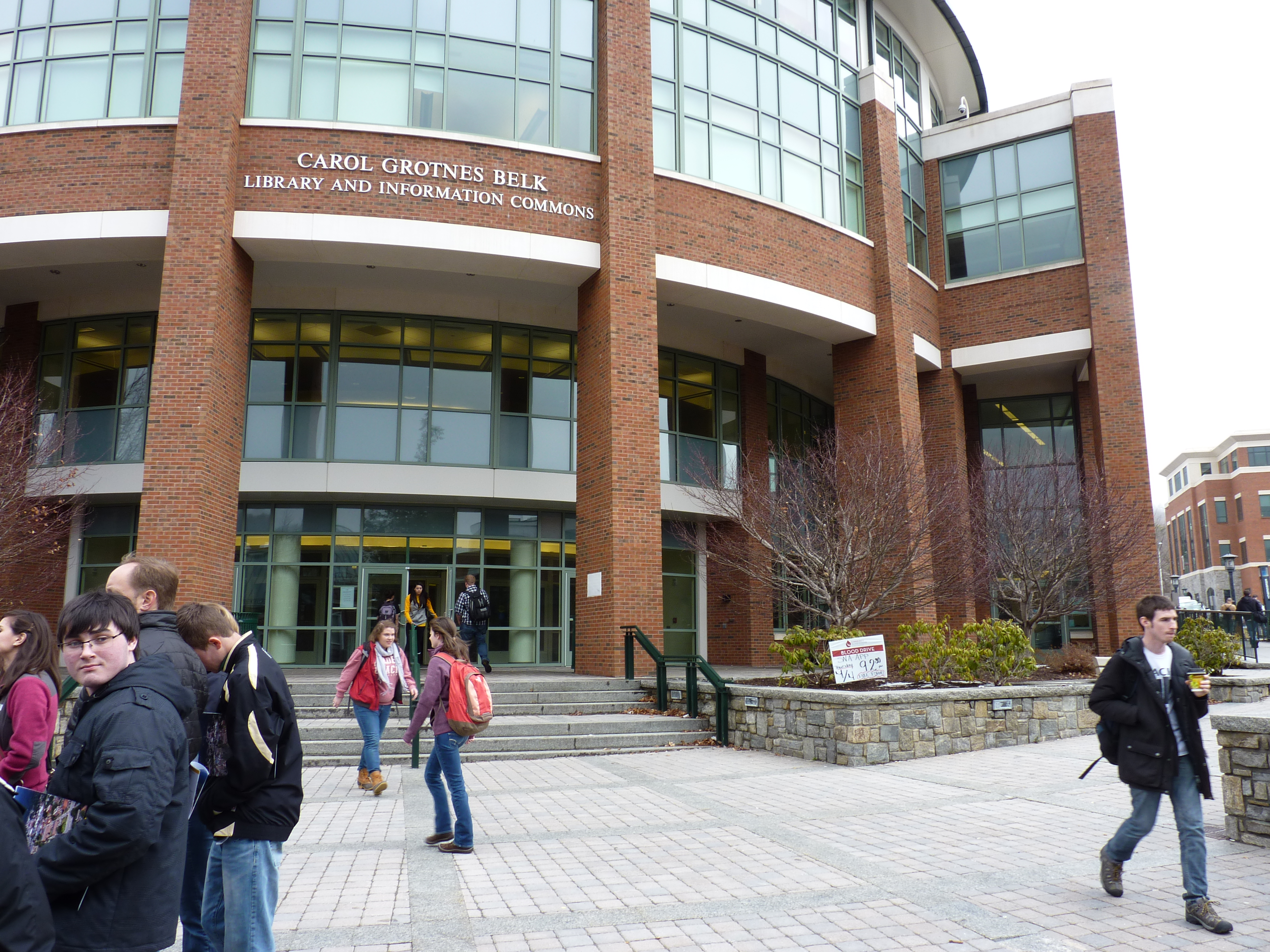
Carol Belk Library

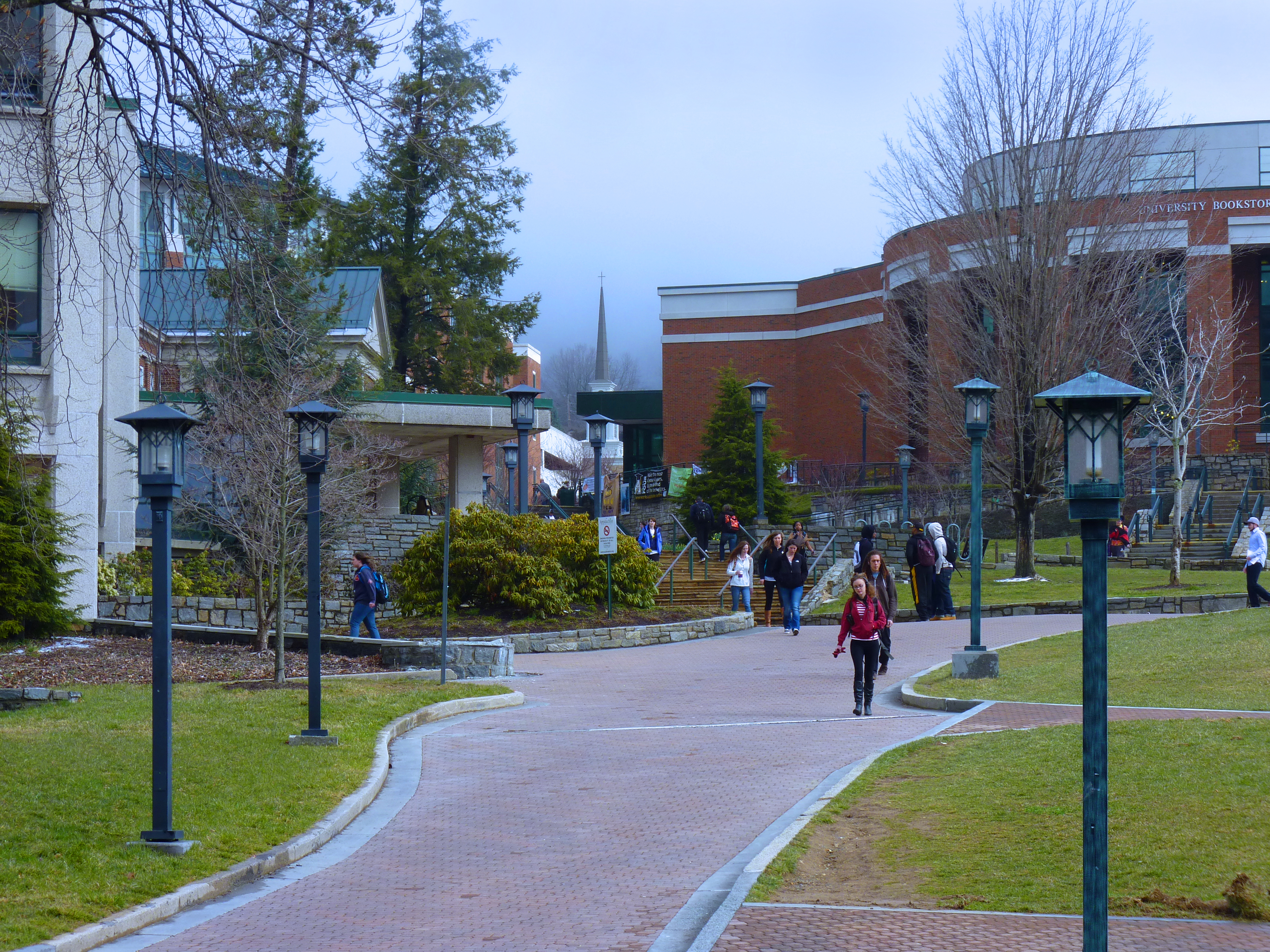
Campus

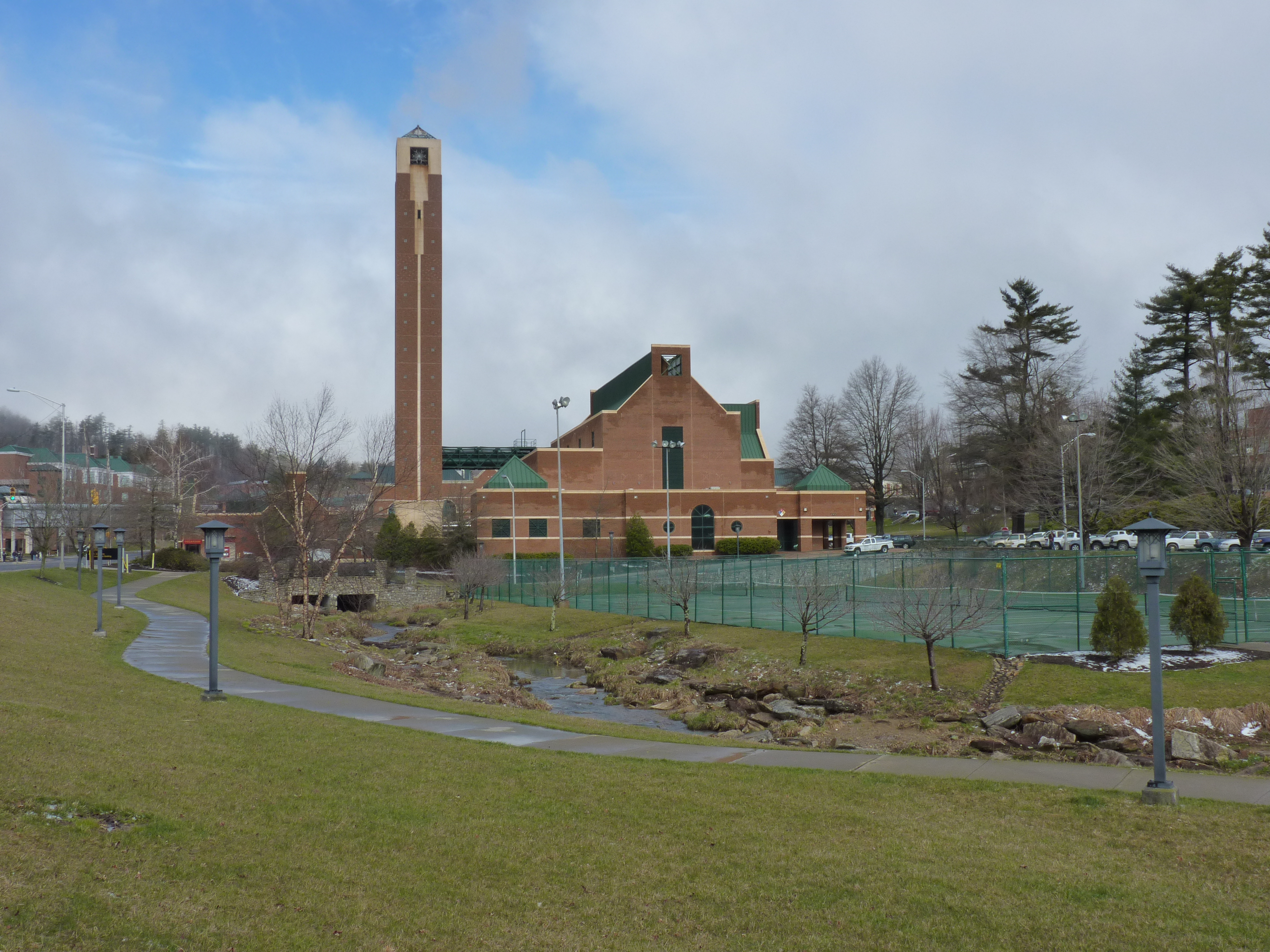
Tower

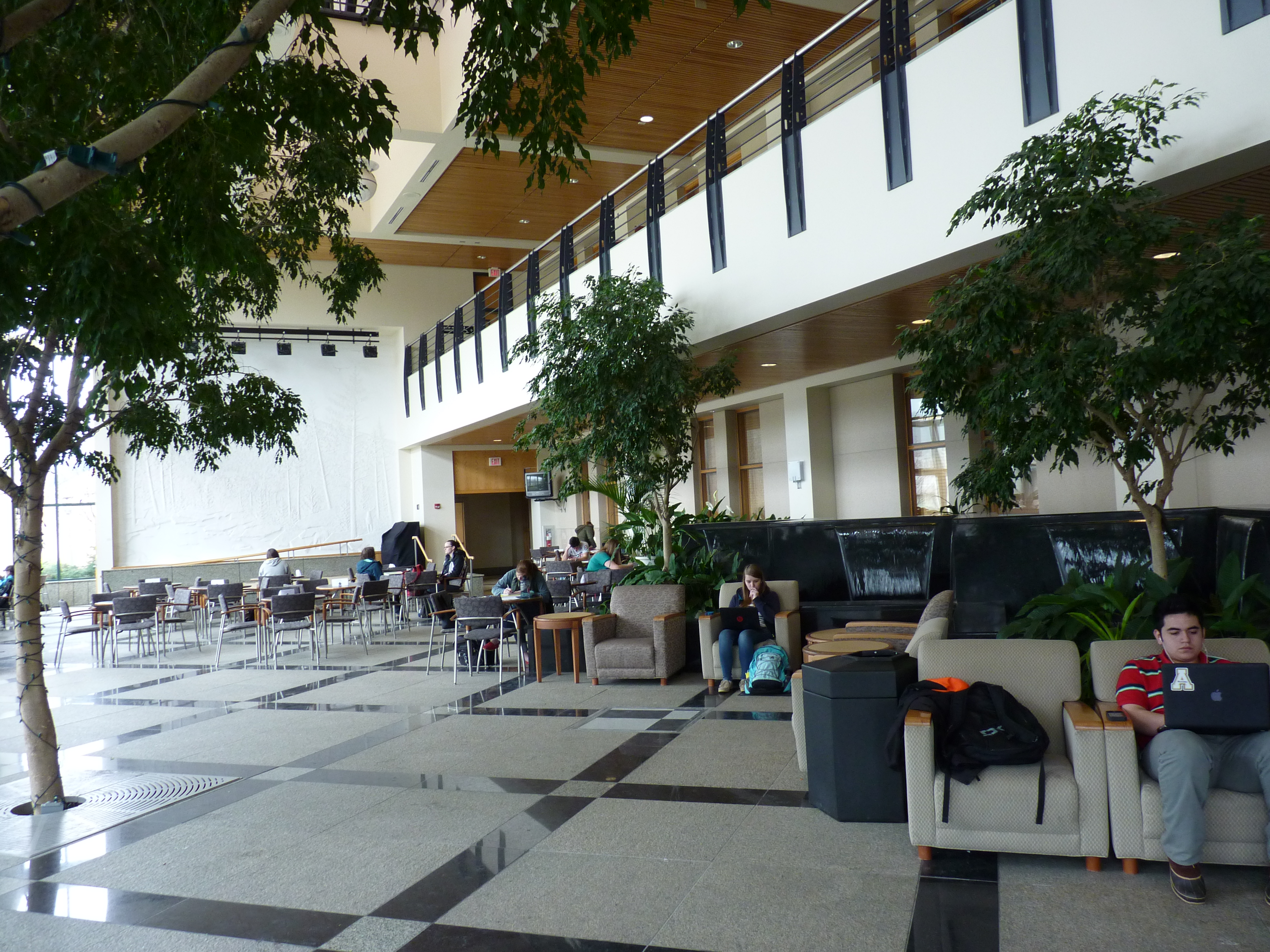

== Administration ==
The University of North Carolina's Board of Governors plans and develops the coordinated system of higher education in the state. It sets university policy but delegate Appalachian State's daily operations to a chancellor. The chancellor likewise delegates some duties to the provost, several vice-chancellors, and other administrative offices. These administrative offices are advised by several university committees on the needs of campus constituents, as represented by a Faculty Senate, Staff Senate, Graduate Student Association Senate, and the Student Government Association.

=== Presidents ===
- Blanford Barnard Dougherty (1899–1955)
- James D. Rankin (1955, interim)
- William H. Plemmons (1955–1969)
- Herbert W. Wey (1969–1971)

=== Chancellors ===
- Herbert W. Wey (1971–1979)
- Cratis D. Williams (1975, acting)
- John E. Thomas (1979–1993)
- Francis T. Borkowski (1993–2003)
- Provost Harvey R. Durham (2003–2004, interim)
- Kenneth E. Peacock (2004–2014)
- Sheri Everts (2014–2024)
- Heather Hulburt Norris (2024–present)

=== Campus police ===
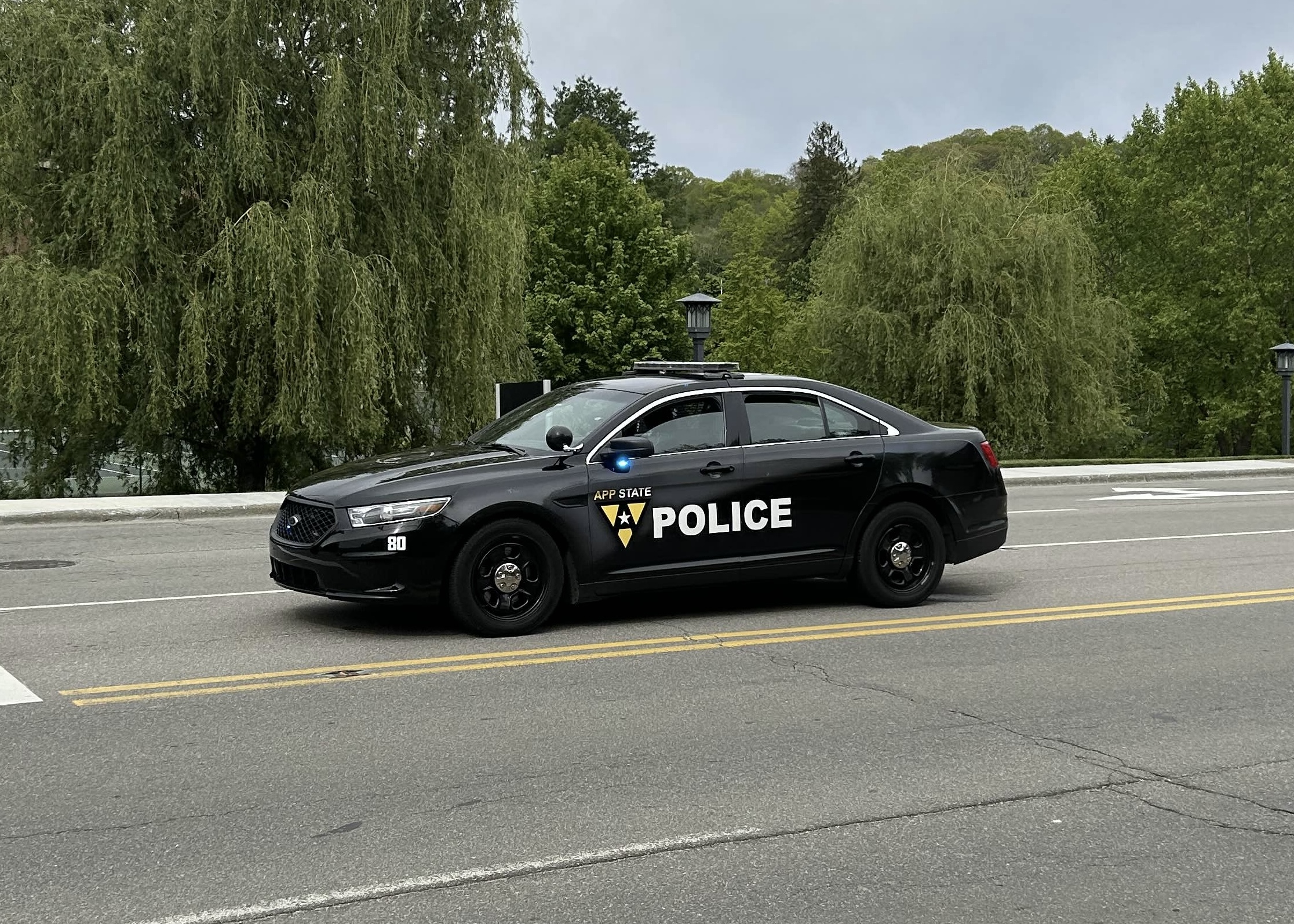
Appalachian Police Department patrol car, specifically a Ford Taurus

The official campus police department is the Appalachian State University Police Department, alternatively the Appalachian Police Department. The university houses the Appalachian Police Academy under the two-year Appalachian Police Officer Development Program.

Police vehicles used by the Appalachian Police Department primarily consist of Ford vehicles, although it has begun a shift towards electric vehicles. Notably, a new fleet of electric patrol vehicles partially include golden-colored Tesla sedans.

== Academics ==
Academic rankings

Regional
- U.S. News & World Report: 3

National
- Forbes: 256
- WSJ/College Pulse: 601–800

Appalachian State offers 176 undergraduate and 42 graduate majors. The average GPA for incoming freshmen in 2017 was 4.20. Courses at Appalachian are organized into eight colleges and one graduate school:

- Beaver College of Health Sciences
- College of Arts and Sciences
- College of Fine and Applied Arts
- Cratis D. Williams School of Graduate Studies
- Hayes School of Music
- Reich College of Education
- The Honors College
- University College
- Walker College of Business

=== Library ===
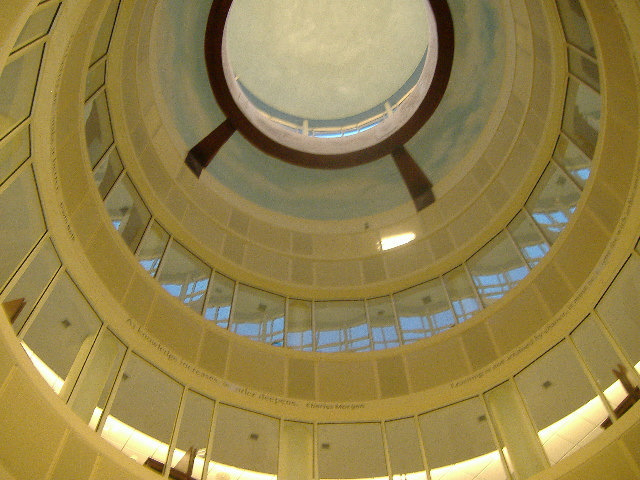
Belk Library rotunda

In 2005, the Carol Grotnes Belk Library & Information Commons opened in a new 165,000-square-foot (15,300 m^{2}) five-story building. Belk Library holds over 1.871 million bound books and periodicals, 1.5 million microforms, 24,000 sound recordings, and 14,000 videos. The library's collections include the W.L. Eury Appalachian Collection and the Stock Car Racing Collection which includes a donation from the family of Richard Petty.

With the opening of the new library building in 2005, Bill and Maureen Rhinehart of Long Island, New York, donated a large collection of rare books in English history, spanning from the 16th to the 19th centuries. The university created a special collections room for this donation which includes some 900 volumes comprising nearly 450 titles.

=== Watauga Residential College ===
Watauga Residential College (formerly Watauga Global Community) is a residential college founded in 1972. Watauga College was founded to be an "interdisciplinary, experimental, residential, coed alternative for social science and humanities general education requirements." Watauga Residential College was developed as "response to rising criticism of American education during the sixties and to the artificial fragmentation of knowledge in the academy; it was seen as a return to the world, where problems and themes do not recognize disciplinary boundaries and education is reconnected with individual learners."

Although it has changed names over the years, Watauga College in 1972, Watauga Global Community in 2008, and Watauga Residential College in 2014, its mission has remained relatively the same. "Watauga Residential College pursues its mission through a sequenced, interdisciplinary, experiential curriculum that requires students to integrate class content, community-based research, and multicultural immersion. This innovative curriculum, in conjunction with the academic and residential community, creates an atmosphere for the emergence of dynamic learning experiences through unique interactions among students and faculty." A key focus of Watauga is on the residential community, so for the first year students are required to live in the living learning center.

Watauga College was first based in Watauga Hall, then for decades was based in East Hall, a large U-shaped dormitory on the east end of campus. The dorm was known campus-wide as having the largest rooms of any dorm on campus, yet it was one of the oldest dorms on campus. Upon the completion of the Living Learning Center in 2003, Watauga College relocated and East Hall will either be renovated or destroyed because of the high cost of renovating such an old building.

=== Off-campus centers ===
Appalachian State University offers off-campus courses through three off-campus centers and online. These centers are:

- The Appalachian Center at Hickory
- The Appalachian Center at Burke in Morganton
- The Appalachian Center at Caldwell in Hudson

Off-campus programs offer students the ability to maintain family and careers while working toward a degree. Full-time undergraduate programs are available in Elementary Education, Advertising, Criminal Justice, Management, Social Work and Psychology. Appalachian provides a variety of off-campus, part-time undergraduate and graduate programs.

=== Publications ===
The university publishes or holds copyrights to several other periodicals, including:

- IMPULSE: The Premier Undergraduate Neuroscience Journal, Department of Psychology, College of Arts and Sciences
- Appalachian Business Review, Bureau of Business and Economic Research, Walker College of Business
- Appalachian Journal, Center for Appalachian Studies, College of Arts and Sciences
- Appalachian Today, University magazine
- Cold Mountain Review, Department of English
- History Matters: An Undergraduate Journal of Historical Research, student-run journal
- The International Comet Quarterly, Department of Physics and Astronomy (ceded to the Smithsonian Astrophysical Observatory in 1990)
- Journal of Developmental Education, Center for Developmental Education, Reich College of Education
- Journal of Health Care Marketing, Center for Management Development, Walker College of Business
- The Appalachian, student newspaper
- The Peel Literature & Arts Review, yearly student arts publication

=== Centers and institutes ===
The university houses several academic centers and institutes related to its mission. These include:

- Adult Basic Skills Professional Development Project
- Appalachian Energy Center - includes the following:
  - Collaborative Biodiesel Project
  - Renewable Energy Initiative
  - Small Wind R&D Site
- Blue Cross NC Institute for Health and Human Services
- Center for Appalachian Studies - includes the Appalachian Collection held by Belk Library, the Appalachian Cultural Museum, and publishing editor of the Appalachian Journal
- Center for Entrepreneurship
- Center for Judaic, Holocaust, & Peace Studies
- Center for Management Development
- Goodnight Family Sustainable Development Program
- Math and Science Education Center
- National Center for Developmental Education and the Kellogg Institute
- The Human Performance Lab at the North Carolina Research Campus
- Henderson Springs LGBTQ+ Center - located in Plemmons Student Union on the first floor
- Women's Center - located in Plemmons Student Union on the first floor
- Multicultural Center - located in Plemmons Student Union

== Student life ==
Undergraduate demographics as of Fall 2023
Race and ethnicity	Total
White	81%
Hispanic	9%
Two or more races	5%
Black	3%
Asian	2%
Unknown	1%
Economic diversity
Low-income (Note: The percentage of students who received an income-based federal Pell grant intended for low-income students.)	27%
Affluent (Note: The percentage of students who are a part of the American middle class at the bare minimum.)	73%

Students at ASU enjoy a variety of outdoor activities. The mountains offer snowboarding, skiing, tubing, rock climbing, hiking, cycling, rafting, camping, and fishing on and around the Blue Ridge Parkway. ASU also has over 400 clubs and organizations run by the McCaskey Center for Student Involvement and Leadership, such as Greek organizations, academic and diversity clubs, and sports clubs. Before the start of every semester, the university hosts a Club Expo featuring all the campus clubs and organizations. This event is for students to find an organization or club that suits them and get involved. The university also has volunteer centers, including the Looking Glass Gallery, the LGBT Center, and the Women's Center (the only completely volunteer-run Women's Center in North Carolina). All three are under the supervision of the Multicultural Student Development Office. In 2016, ASU opened a fourth center in the student union; the Student Veterans Resource Center. The campus also has three indoor fitness facilities, an athletics field, and an outdoor recreation center.

The student union also holds four permanent art collections, managed by the PSU Art Team. These collections are the Appalachian Artists Collection, Leigh Lane Edwards Collection, Dave Robinson Collection and Nature Photography Collection. The collections include art from notable artists such as Joan Miró, Denny Dent, Tim Guthrie, Warren Dennis, and Susan H. Page.

The Appalachian Popular Programming Society (A.P.P.S.) is a university-funded organization that exists to plan and provide diverse educational, enriching, and entertaining events for ASU's student body and community. Through its seven programming councils, A.P.P.S. members select, plan, promote, and present a diverse variety of popular entertainment programs and films that enhance ASU students' social and cultural life. A.P.P.S. was founded in 1985 to help with the student nightlife and to support retention. It plays a vital role in fostering and developing an inclusive ASU community. The seven councils of A.P.P.S. are Heritage, Club Shows, Main Stage, Representation and Intentional Student Engagement (RISE), Films, Special Events, and Spirit & Traditions. Students can enjoy concerts and other miscellaneous events at Legends, an entertainment facility on campus. ASU also offers an in-house movie theater at Plemmons Student Union, Greenbriar Theater, where students can watch movies.

== Sustainability ==
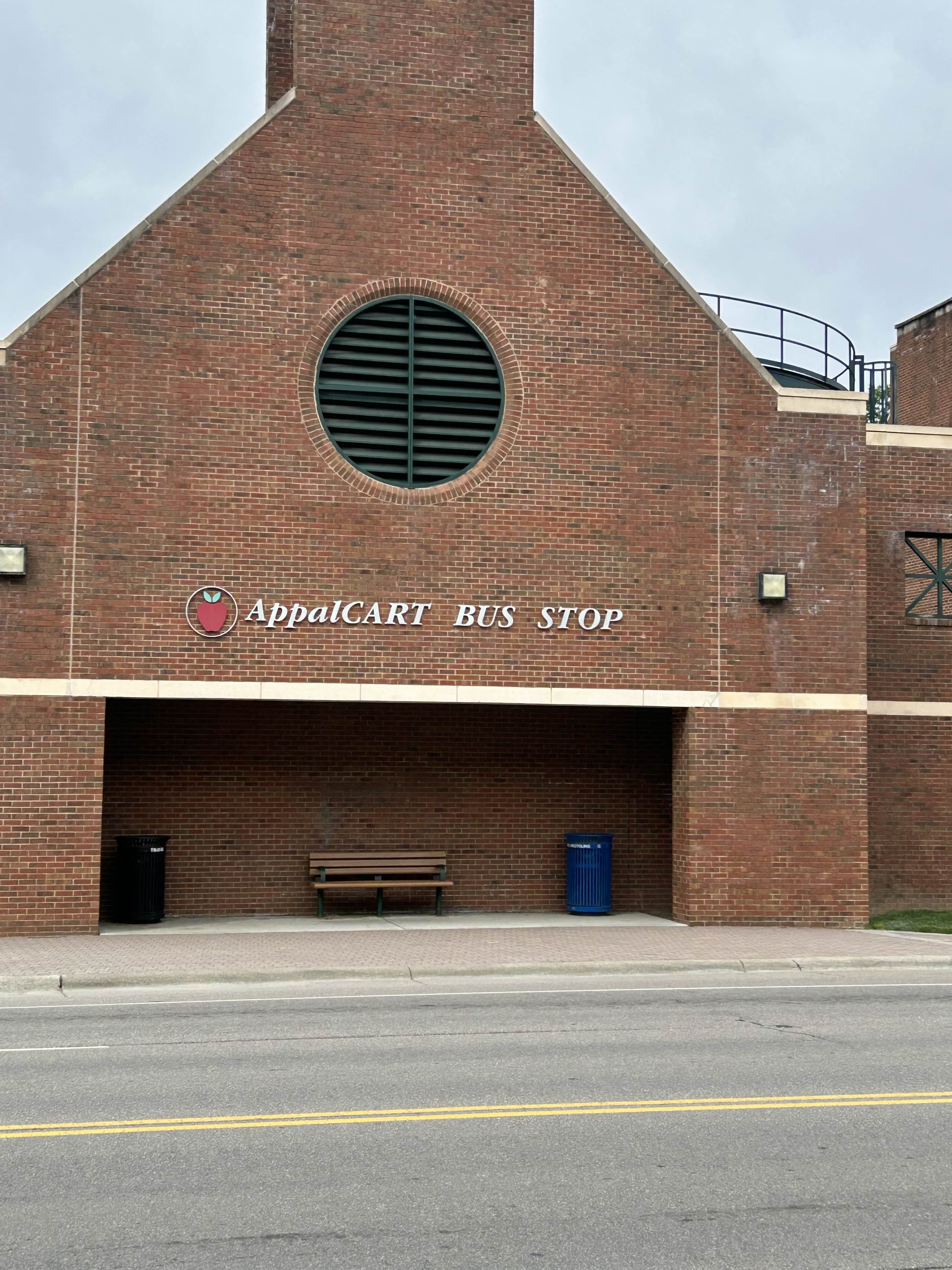
AppalCART bus stop located on the Appalachian State campus

Appalachian has invested in several sustainability projects in recent years such as:

- A 100-kilowatt (130 hp) wind turbine was installed at the Broyhill Inn and Conference Center in 2008. The wind turbine has become the most visible symbol of Appalachian's projects in renewable energy. Situated at the highest point on campus and standing more than 153 feet (47 m) tall, it was selected specifically to depict an industrial-scale wind turbine. As of May 2012, the turbine had produced over 311,000 kilowatt-hours (1,120,000 MJ).
- Both Frank Residence Hall, renovated in 2009, and The Mountaineer Residence Hall erected in 2011 have LEED® Gold Certifications and received a total of 68 points based on energy saving and sustainability features (65 points are needed to receive gold certification). Mountaineer Residence Hall houses a 40-panel solar thermal system to provide hot water needs. Buildings on ASU's campus that utilize solar energy include the Varsity Gym, Plemmons Student Union, Raley Hall, and Kerr Scott Hall. Kerr Scott Hall also has the first green roof on campus. The green roof works to conserve energy by providing shade and removing heat from the air through evapotranspiration.
- Appalachian Food Services is working to reduce food waste on campus by sending pre- and post-consumer food waste to a composting facility whose compost is used by Appalachian's Landscape Services as fertilizers.
- The AppalCART is a no-cost public transit service that services the campus and surrounding Boone community.
- Solar trash compactors were installed around Sanford mall in 2010. The trash compactors run 100% on solar power, and are completely self powered.
- Outside of the Living Learning Center sits The Edible Schoolyard which is a community space where students, faculty, and staff can maintain a garden plot to learn gardening practices. At this garden space, small-scale farming and gardening principles are pursued in an effort to teach productive maintenance of agricultural ecosystems, self-sufficiency, and permaculture.
- We Are Still In (2018) - Over 3,500 organizations, representative of the United States' economy and society, are showing the world that we stand by the Paris Climate Agreement and are committed to meeting its goals.
- Tree Campus USA certification - Appalachian State University has received Tree Campus USA certification from the Arbor Day Foundation. The certification process was a collaborative effort between the Department of Biology, Department of Geography and Planning, Physical Plant and New River Light and Power. "This certification demonstrates Appalachian's commitment to environmental aspects of sustainability."
- American Campuses Act on Climate Roundtable invited participant (2015) - Appalachian State University was one of 38 institutions of higher learning invited to participate in the American Campuses Act on Climate Roundtable Nov. 19 at the Eisenhower Executive Office Building in Washington, D.C. The event was hosted by the White House Council on Environmental Quality.
- Climate Leadership Award - In October 2015, the university was a recipient of Second Nature and the USGBC's Climate Leadership Award, which recognized Appalachian's commitment to climate action.
- Climate Pledge - In addition, Chancellor Everts visited the White House for the Day of Climate Action and signed the American Campuses Act on Climate Pledge. Chancellor Everts also signed the newly revamped Second Nature Climate Commitment.
- Received Carolina Recycling Association award - Appalachian State University's composting program has received the Outstanding Composting or Organics Program Award from the Carolina Recycling Association.

== Athletics ==
App State athletics logo

Appalachian's sports teams are nicknamed the Mountaineers. They compete in NCAA Division I and are members of the Sun Belt Conference. Appalachian fields varsity teams in 17 sports, seven for men and ten for women. The Mountaineer football team started competing in the NCAA Football Bowl Subdivision (FBS) in the 2014–2015 academic year.

University Recreation (UREC) also offers 20 club sports that compete with other regional institutions on a non-varsity level: lacrosse (men's and women's), rugby (men's and women's), soccer (men's and women's), ultimate frisbee (men's and women's), volleyball (men's and women's), climbing, cycling, equestrian, fencing, ice hockey, skiing, racquetball, snowboarding, swimming, and triathlon.

=== Football ===
Appalachian won three consecutive Division I FCS (I-AA) national championships in 2005, 2006, and 2007, over the University of Northern Iowa, the University of Massachusetts, and the University of Delaware, respectively. The Mountaineers are the first FCS football team to win three straight national championships since the playoffs began in 1978.

They are also the first Division I program to win three consecutive national championships since Army accomplished the feat in 1944, 1945, and 1946.

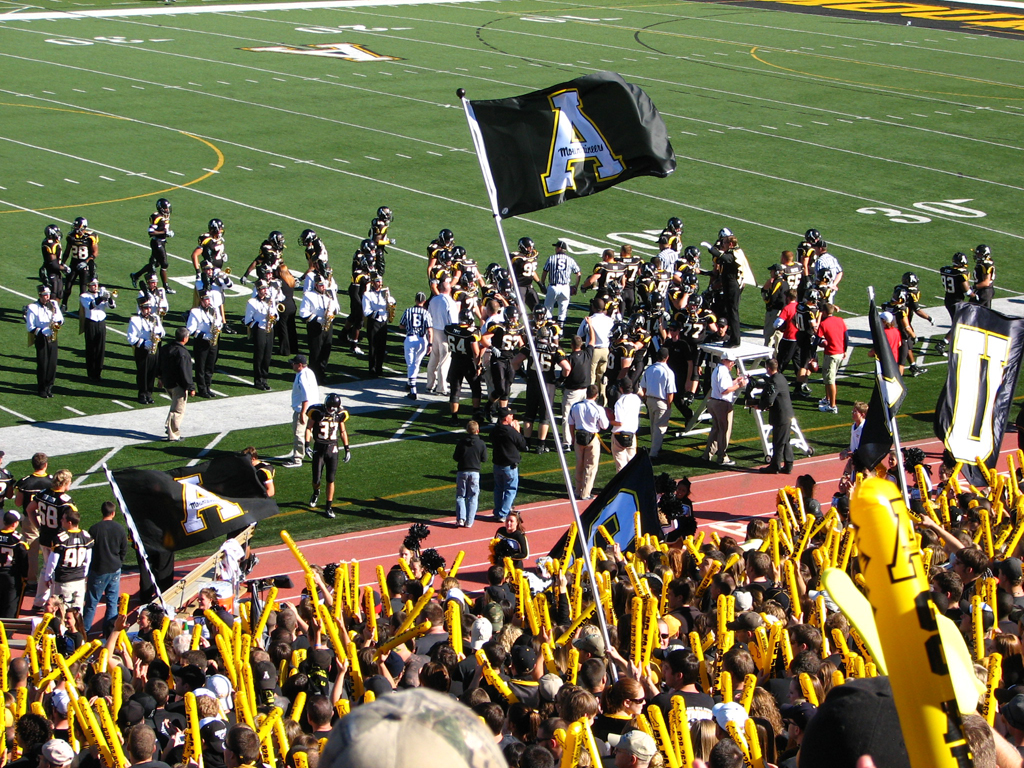
The Mountaineers football team in 2007

In a milestone for ASU athletics, on September 1, 2007, the Appalachian State football team played their season opener at the fifth-ranked University of Michigan in front of the largest crowd to ever witness an ASU football game. Appalachian State beat Michigan in the game that would become known as the "Alltime Upset" by Sports Illustrated with a final score of 34–32 and became the first Division I FCS (I-AA) football team to defeat a Division I FBS (I-A) team ranked in the AP poll.

Appalachian State moved to the FBS subdivision in 2014, finishing its first season with a winning record but ineligible for a bowl bid per NCAA rules. Each season from 2015 to 2019, App State won both its conference championship and final bowl game. In 2020, although the Mountaineers did not win the Sun Belt Conference, they did win their sixth consecutive bowl game, defeating North Texas 56–28 in the inaugural Myrtle Beach Bowl.

== In media ==
In 2004, a committee for the Appalachian Family Caravan tour created a promotional video titled "Hot Hot Hot", shown throughout the area by Chancellor Kenneth E. Peacock. The video became an inadvertent internet phenomenon and was featured on VH1's Web Junk 20 program in early 2006. The video was never intended to promote Appalachian State to anyone but the Family Caravan, much less as a recruiting tool for prospective students. The video is no longer used by the university, due to student and alumni protests.

In 2002, MTV's program Road Rules visited App State to produce an episode called Campus Crawl, aired on-campus during an annual, winter student swimming event called the "Polar Plunge". The show's participants also crossed a high-wire strung between Coltrane and Gardner Halls.

On March 16, 2012, Appalachian State placed a tenured sociology professor on administrative leave for a variety of charges, which included showing an anti-pornography documentary, The Price of Pleasure. This move gained national attention from the academic community.

== Notable alumni ==
=== Academia ===
- BJ Casey – psychologist, expert on adolescent brain development and self-control
- Henry Giroux – scholar, a founder of critical pedagogy
- Robert Allen Phillips – known for work on stakeholder theory and organizational ethics
- Royce Shingleton – professor and author
- Laura Wright – founder of academic field of Vegan Studies

=== Arts and entertainment ===
- Eric Bachmann – musician and producer; principal member of groups Crooked Fingers and Archers of Loaf
- Carlton Bost – musician, composer, producer; member of groups Berlin, Deadsy, Orgy, and Stabbing Westward
- Eric Church – country music singer
- Luke Combs – country music singer; attended for five years and dropped out with 1 credit hour remaining to pursue a music career
- Eustace Conway – naturalist, focus of book The Last American Man, one of subjects featured in History Channel series Mountain Men
- Liane Edwards – Americana and country music artist
- Charles Frazier – novelist, author of Cold Mountain
- David Furr – actor, Tony Award nominee
- Michael Gregory – of the Gregory Brothers and creator of Auto-tune the News series
- Byron Hill – country and pop music songwriter
- Andrew Hubner – novelist
- Lisa Lynn Masters – actress
- The Nude Party – six-piece folk/indie rock band, formed while they were students at Appalachian State in 2012
- Tim Pratt – science fiction and fantasy writer, poet, and 2007 winner of the Hugo Award
- Rainbow Kitten Surprise – members attended and agreed on a deal with Split Rail Records, a label at Appalachian State's Hayes School of Music
- Kate Rhudy – singer, songwriter, and musician
- Jason Roberts – guitarist known for collaborations with Norah Jones
- Douglas Sarine – co-creator of Ask a Ninja
- Mary Ellen Snodgrass – author, two-time New York Public Library award winner
- Whitney Thore – TV personality
- David Weber – science fiction and fantasy author
- Gary Wheeler – film director and producer
- Gene Wooten – Nashville Dobro player and session musician

=== Athletics ===
- Sam Adams – professional golfer who played on the PGA Tour
- Jane Albright – women's college basketball head coach
- Jennifer E. Alley – former North Carolina Tar Heels women's basketball head coach
- Ike Anderson – Olympic Greco-Roman wrestler (1988 Summer Olympics)
- Jimmy Armstrong – former NFL cornerback for the Dallas Cowboys
- Dusty Blake - MLB pitching coach (St. Louis Cardinals)
- David Bostian – professional wrestler signed to WWE under ring name Myles Borne
- Travaris Cadet – former NFL running back
- Don Cardwell – former MLB pitcher, 1969 World Series champion
- Dexter Coakley – former NFL linebacker (Dallas Cowboys and St. Louis Rams), 3x Pro Bowler, member of the College Football Hall of Fame
- Jaylin Davis – former Minor League Baseball player, currently plays for the York Revolution of the Atlantic League of Professional Baseball
- Akeem Davis-Gaither – NFL linebacker for the Arizona Cardinals
- Matt Dodge – former NFL punter
- Armanti Edwards – former NFL and CFL wide receiver; led team to two NCAA FCS national championships as quarterback, member of the College Football Hall of Fame
- Ryan Ellis – NASCAR Cup Series driver
- Darrynton Evans – NFL running back
- Ashley Fliehr – professional wrestler signed to WWE under ring name Charlotte Flair (transferred to North Carolina State University)
- Ed Gainey – former CFL defensive back
- Alvin Gentry – former NBA head coach of Miami Heat, Detroit Pistons, Los Angeles Clippers, Phoenix Suns, and New Orleans Pelicans
- Tony Gravely – UFC fighter
- Dino Hackett – former NFL linebacker (Kansas City Chiefs and Seattle Seahawks)
- Larry Hand – former NFL defensive end who played 13 seasons for the Detroit Lions and was selected as the Lions' most valuable player in 1972
- Mary Jayne Harrelson – track athlete, two-time NCAA Division I Women's Outdoor 1500m National Champion
- Cooper Hodges – NFL offensive tackle for the Jacksonville Jaguars
- Ron Hodges – former MLB catcher (New York Mets)
- Jason Hunter – former NFL defensive end
- C. J. Huntley – NBA player for the Phoenix Suns
- Dexter Jackson – former NFL wide receiver
- D'Marco Jackson – NFL linebacker for the Chicago Bears
- Shemar Jean-Charles – NFL cornerback for the Seattle Seahawks
- Daniel Jeremiah – analyst for NFL Network, writer with NFL.com, host of Move the Sticks podcast
- Paul Johnson – college football head coach
- Daniel Kilgore – former NFL center (San Francisco 49ers)
- Kendall Lamm – long-time NFL offensive tackle
- Corey Lynch – former NFL safety
- Rico Mack – former NFL linebacker
- Sam Martin – NFL punter for the Carolina Panthers
- Demetrius McCray – former NFL cornerback
- Matt McMahon – former head coach for men's basketball head coach at LSU 2022–2026; former men's basketball head coach at Murray State 2015–2022, Murray State Racers men's basketball 2011–2015 (assistant), UNC Wilmington Seahawks men's basketball 2010–2011 (assistant), Appalachian State Mountaineers men's basketball 2002–2010 (assistant), Tennessee Volunteers basketball 2001–2002 (GA), Appalachian State Mountaineers men's basketball 2000–2001 (student assistant)
- Doug Middleton – former NFL safety
- Melissa Morrison-Howard – two-time Olympic hurdler bronze medalist (2000 & 2004 Summer Olympics)
- Marques Murrell – former NFL linebacker
- Tyson Patterson – former professional basketball player
- Henry Pearson – former NFL fullback (Green Bay Packers)
- Ron Prince – former NFL assistant coach Detroit Lions, former head coach at Kansas State University
- Brian Quick – former NFL wide receiver (Washington Redskins, St. Louis Rams)
- Mike Ramsey – former MLB infielder 1978–985
- Mark Royals – NFL punter 1987–2003
- Scott Satterfield – former App State and University of Louisville head football coach; current head football coach at University of Cincinnati
- John Settle – former NFL running back, current running backs coach for Rice University
- Belus Smawley – former NBA player, one of the first basketball players to regularly use the jump shot
- D. J. Smith – former NFL linebacker and current defensive coordinator for App State
- Jeffrey Springs – MLB pitcher for the Athletics
- Matt Stevens – former NFL safety
- D. J. Thompson – former professional basketball player
- Coaker Triplett – former MLB outfielder for Cubs, Cardinals, and Phillies 1938–1945
- Daniel Wilcox – former NFL tight end (Baltimore Ravens)
- Steve Wilks – NFL defensive coordinator for the New York Jets, former
- Everett Withers – football head coach of Texas State Bobcats, former head coach of James Madison Dukes and University of North Carolina at Chapel Hill

=== Business ===
- James Edgar Broyhill – founder of Broyhill Furniture Industries, Inc.
- Chuck Gallagher – entrepreneur, speaker and author
- Harry L. Williams – president and CEO of the Thurgood Marshall College Fund

=== Economics and finance ===
- Stephen J. Dubner – writer, co-author of Freakonomics
- Chris Swecker – head of corporate security for Bank of America and former assistant director, FBI

=== Government and law ===
- Robert P. Ashley Jr. – retired U.S. Army lt. gen; 19th director of the U.S. Defense Intelligence Agency
- Chad Barefoot – former North Carolina state senator who represented the 18th district 2013–2018
- Danny Britt – North Carolina Senate, 24th district
- Ted Budd – U.S. senator; former member of U.S. House of Representatives from North Carolina's 13th district
- Javiera Caballero – member of the Durham City Council
- Anderson Clayton – political activist and chair of the North Carolina Democratic Party
- Howard Coble – former Republican 6th district U.S. congressman from Greensboro, North Carolina (only attended Appalachian for one year)
- Kevin Corbin – North Carolina Senate, 50th district
- Morris "Moe" Davis – retired United States Air Force colonel, lawyer, and administrative law judge
- Danya Dayson – associate judge on the Superior Court of the District of Columbia
- Josh Dobson – former North Carolina House representing 85th district, current North Carolina commissioner of labor
- Nelson Dollar – North Carolina House of Representatives, 36th district
- Andy Dulin – North Carolina House of Representatives, 104th district
- Jeffrey Elmore – North Carolina House of Representatives, 94th district
- John R. Evans Jr. – U.S. Army lt. gen; 8th commanding general of United States Army North
- Destin Hall – speaker of the North Carolina House of Representatives; North Carolina House of Representatives, 87th district
- Kelly Hastings – North Carolina House of Representatives, 110th district
- Ralph Hise – North Carolina Senate, 47th district
- Patricia Hollingsworth Holshouser – First Lady of North Carolina, chairwoman of the North Carolina Commission on Citizen Participation, and member of the U.S. National Council on Economic Opportunity
- Bryan R. Holloway – North Carolina House of Representatives, 91st district
- Allen Joines – 17th mayor of Winston-Salem, North Carolina
- Brock Long – FEMA administrator
- Steve Metcalf – lobbyist and former politician
- Grey Mills – North Carolina House of Representatives, 95th district
- Buck Newton – North Carolina Senate, 4th district
- Reece Pyrtle – North Carolina House of Representatives, 65th district
- Chris Swecker – attorney and assistant director of the FBI for the CID
- David Willis – North Carolina House of Representatives, 68th district

=== Ministry and religion ===
- Henry Babers – evangelist and scholar
- Franklin Graham – evangelist and missionary, son of Billy Graham, CEO and president of Samaritan's Purse and the Billy Graham Evangelistic Association
- James Emery White – pastor, author, and professor

=== Science ===
- Emily E. Edwards – physicist; executive director of the Illinois Quantum Information Science and Technology Center (IQUIST) at the University of Illinois Urbana–Champaign
- Rachel Harris Larson – chemist and dental researcher
- Stanley South – archaeologist; author of Method and Theory in Historical Archaeology

=== Other ===
- Steven M. Greer – ufologist and retired physician; founded the Center for the Study of Extraterrestrial Intelligence (CSETI)
- Corinne Hoch – vice president general of the United Daughters of the Confederacy
