= Chuck Gallagher =

American entrepreneur, speaker and author

- Born: Baltimore, Maryland, U.S.
- Education: Appalachian State University (BS, MS)
- Occupations: Entrepreneur, author, speaker
- Website: ChuckGallagher.com

Chuck Gallagher is an American entrepreneur, speaker and author.

He is the author of Second Chances and has been featured in media outlets including Life & Health, Small Business Opportunities, Business Week, CBS, CNN, Lifetime and National Public Radio. As a business ethics speaker and author his clients include Medtronic, the FBI, U.S. Navy, University of Florida, Skanska, University of North Georgia, Barclays, and UnitedHealth Group#UnitedHealthcare.

== Early life and education ==
Gallagher was born in Baltimore, Maryland. In 1975, he enrolled at Appalachian State University and successfully earned a bachelor’s degree in Accounting in 1979 and a master's degree in accounting by 1989. During his collegiate years, Gallagher took part in various extracurricular activities and societies and was a dedicated member of Beta Alpha Psi.

== Career ==
Gallagher serves as a chief operating officer for American Funeral Financial and served as a senior vice president for Stewart Enterprises. He is also the president of Ethics Resource Group and SportsEthics.com.

At the age of 26, Gallagher became the youngest tax partner in a regional CPA firm and was one of only three CPAs in the country asked to testify before the U.S. House Ways and Means Committee on a new employee benefits provision of the tax law. During that time, he authored numerous articles for national publications and has developed several continuing professional education (CPE) seminars.

Gallagher's career took a significant turn, leading to the loss of his professional standing as he was convicted of embezzlement and tax evasion in 1995. Currently, Gallagher helps corporate employees and other audiences realize the ramifications of their ethical choices and works with firms in fraud prevention.

== Works ==
- Gallagher, Chuck (2011). Second Chances – Transforming Adversity into Opportunity. Chicago, IL: Lifepaths Publishing. pp. 208 pages.
- Gallagher, Chuck (2014). Message from the Mountain: Awakening to Your Life's Purpose. Chicago, IL: Lifepaths Publishing. pp. 126 pages. ISBN 978-0979461088.
- Gallagher, Chuck (2023) Co-Author. Monday Morning Ethics. Leadership Books. pp. 318 pages. ISBN 1951648544
