= Liane Edwards =

Liane Edwards was born in Leigh Ann Abernethy in Indian Trail, North Carolina on November 11, 1969. Her first stage appearance was at the age of seven, in a local Baptist church. She was raised in a musical family. After getting her BA in French from Appalachian State University in Boone, North Carolina she headed to France, where she planned to master the language.

After a brief return to Colorado State University, she decided to move to Ardèche, France to start her career in music. She began writing songs at the age of 22 and recorded her first album in 1996. She is an independent artist that tours year round, 250 days a year. She plays guitar, piano, banjo and washboard. She is very appreciated in Europe for her dynamic stage shows. This popular stage artist promotes americana and country music all over Europe, and has an important following.

In 1998, a song from her album "Life Size" was 5 on the country music charts. "Jack", a title from her 2008 album was in the Top 10 Music Box ratings. She was nominated for Female Singer of the Year by the FCMA several times. She was voted Songwriter of the Year 2017 in the French Country Highway Awards.

Liane Edwards has collaborated in the studio or on stage with such artists as : Screaming Jay Hawkins, Zucchero, Albert Lee, Michael Jones, Bijou (SVP), Jett Williams, Ticky Holgado, Soldat Louis, Patrick Verbeke, Michelle Malone, Big Al Downing, Christian Seguret (fr), Brian Wooten, Janet Martin, Annabel, Rick Trevino, Heather Myles, Sarah Jory, Johnny Gallagher.

== Recording History ==
- Ghost Rider 1996
- Life Size 1998
- Inside the Machine 2001
- Branded 2004
- Caught Red Handed 2008
- High Heels and Shotguns 2012
- Raisin' Dust 2017

== Band members ==
- Jean-Pierre Benlian - Bass (1993–present)
- Alex Coin - Guitar (1993-1994)
- Richard Roums -Guitar (1994)
- Jean-Daniel Ott - Guitar (1994-2000)
- Olivier Giry - Guitar (2000-2001)
- Henri Laye - Guitar (2001-2012)
- Matthias Petitbois - Guitar (2012–2015)
- Guillaume Defoulounoux- Guitar (2015–2017)
- Thierry Jaoul - guitar (2015–present)
- Alexandre Bigot - guitar (2017–present)
- Jérôme Clavert - Drums (1993-1996)
- Jean-Louis Couenne - Drums (1996-1997)
- Lionel Goyot - Drums (1997-1998)
- Pham Trong Hieu - Drums (1998-2004)
- Rafaël Pereira - Drums (2004-2007)
- Max Cotineau - Drums (2007-2010)
- Jean-François Langelotti - Drums (2010-2012)
- Pierre Vanaret - Drums (2012–2014)
- Jean-Marc Monier Drums (2015–present)
- Nicolas Mermoud Drums (2015–present)
- Olivier Capelli Drums (2015–present)
- Alain Valadon - Pedal Steel (2000-2004)
- François Mathian - Fiddle (2000-2002)
- Thierry LeCoq - Fiddle (2004-2007)
- Monique Lucion - Fiddle (2009)
