= Committee of 48 =

American political association

- Logo of the Committee of 48, established in 1919
- Founded: 1919
- Dissolved: 1923
- Ideology: Liberalism; Social democracy
- Political position: Center-left

The Committee of 48 was an American liberal political association established in 1919 in the hope of creating a new political party for social reform to stand in opposition to the increasing conservatism of both major U.S. political parties, the Republican Party and the Democratic Party.

Named in recognition of the 48 U.S. states to signify the desire to construct a broad national movement, the moderate progressives of the Committee of 48 attempted without success to form such a third party with sympathetic activists from the labor movement in 1920.

The group, commonly known as the "Forty-Eighters", became one of the key constituents in the Conference for Progressive Political Action in 1922, a movement culminating in the independent candidacy of Robert M. La Follette for President of the United States in 1924.

== Organizational history ==
=== Establishment ===
J.A.H. Hopkins, a former member of the Democratic National Committee and head of the short-lived National Party, was the National Secretary of the Committee of 48.

The Committee of 48 traces its roots to January 1919, when a gathering of individuals interested in public affairs gathered in New York City. Those so assembled decided that a formal organization should be sponsored and decided to issue a call for a National Conference. The name "Committee of 48" was chosen as a reflection of the desire to form a national organization bringing together interested representatives of each of the nation's 48 states.

The formal call for a new organization, headlined "Revolution or Reconstruction? A Call to Americans," was first published on March 22 in four prominent liberal publications. This appeal was targeted to Americans who sought neither revolution nor a turn to reaction in America and urged the formation of a new political entity that would stand apart both from the proto-communist revolutionary socialist movement and from the increasing conservatism of the two "old parties" of American politics, the Republicans and Democrats. Public reaction to this announcement was deemed as favorable by the group's organizers.

The first published call to establish the organization read in part:

"Despite America's splendid success in a war waged against foreign autocracy, our country is menaced by the growing power of an autocratic and reactionary minority at home. We stand in danger of losing many of the liberties and advances won in the course of our national development....

"Centralization and autocracy are increasing rapidly in the organization of governments, in the control of credit, and in the determination of public opinion. The very classes whose labors in factory and field are the basis of our economic power, find no effective political medium through which to express their economic demand...

"It is the purpose of the Committee of Forty-eight to summon from all parts of the country the leaders of its liberal thought and of its forward-looking citizens, to meet in conference. We hope that out of this assemblage of the scattered forces of Americanism will come a flexible statement of principles and methods that will permit effective cooperation with organized Labor and Agricultural workers in the tasks of social reconstruction."

Planning on entering the political fray for the long haul, the Committee of 48 opened a headquarters office at 15 E 40th Street in New York City in June 1919, with J.A.H. Hopkins of Morristown, New Jersey, former chairman of the National Executive Committee of the National Party, in the role of Chairman. A more nebulous "General Committee" back of the organization included a number of marquee names of the American mainstream liberal movement, including historian and philosopher Will Durant, attorney Dudley Field Malone, pacifist minister John Haynes Holmes, and writer and academic Robert Morss Lovett, among others.

To gauge public interest in its efforts, the Committee of 48 circulated some 30,000 copies of a survey to progressives around the nation inquiring as to their views on the need for a new political party and polling them on who should lead such a political ticket. Some 21,000 surveys were returned to the organization, loudly voicing approval of a new organization to challenge the dominant Republican and Democratic Parties and endorsing the candidacy of Wisconsin Senator La Follette as their preferred nominee for President.

On September 22, 1919, the organizing committee pegged St. Louis, Missouri as the location at which the founding conference would be held and slated December 9 to 12 as the dates for the event. Some 300,000 copies of a pamphlet entitled A Call to a National Conference were distributed in preparation for the event.

=== National Conference ===
Over 500 persons attended the organizational conference of the Committee of 48, which was gaveled to order on December 9, 1919. That gathering unanimously adopted a first platform for the organization as well as a set of resolutions on various issues of the day. This platform was envisioned as a working draft, to be discussed by the public in preparation for a formally delegated political convention.

The platform approved by the December national conference of the Committee of 48 called for public ownership of transportation, stock yards, grain elevators, public utilities, and "the principle natural resources, such as coal, oil, natural gas, mineral deposits, timber, and water works. The use of tax policy was urged to ensure that idle land was put into productive use. The convention also declared itself for

"Equal economic, political, and legal rights for all, irrespective of sex or color. The immediate and absolute restoration of free speech, free press, peaceable assembly, and all civil rights guaranteed by the Constitution."

An end to the use of legal injunctions in labor disputes was demanded, and the right of workers to "organize and bargain collectively" was endorsed.

The conference passed resolutions calling for the retention of American railroads under government control for a two-year period, requiring that Congress submit any future declaration of war to a direct vote of the people, urging the Blockade of Soviet Russia be immediately lifted and all American forces withdrawn from that country, and demanding that "political prisoners and all imprisoned in violation of their constitutional right of free speech" be immediately released. Additional resolutions were passed urging that universal military training not be implemented and that the American government should "make every effort to secure universal disarmament by international agreement.

=== July 1920 Conventions ===
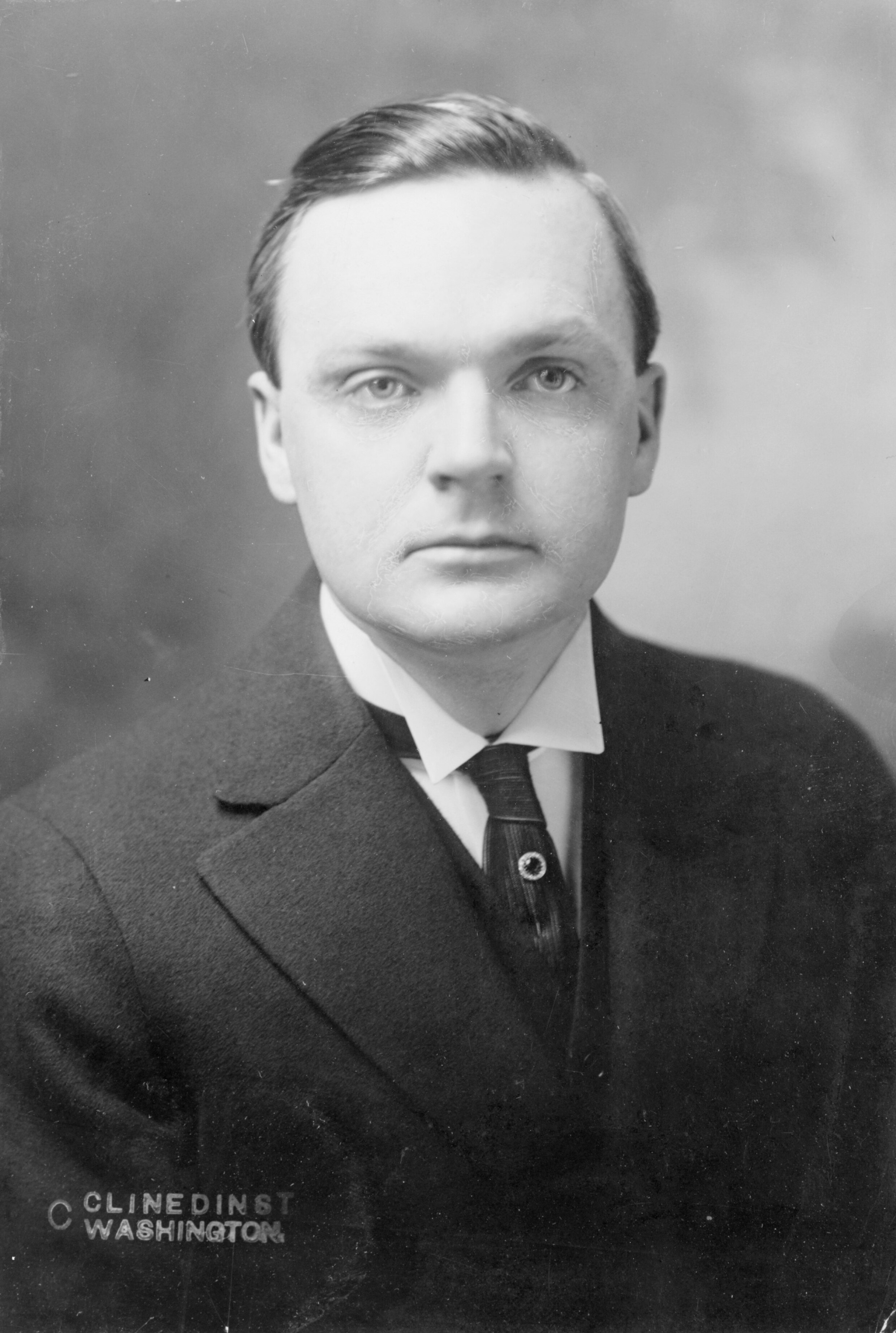
Attorney Dudley Field Malone, spokesman for the pro-unity forces in the Committee of 48 at the July 1920 Convention.

A grand unification convention designed to bring together liberal forces around a new third party was opened in Chicago on July 10, 1920. The gathering brought together the Committee of 48 with representatives of the Single Tax movement, with a view to further combining with the convention of the Labor Party of the United States, due to start in the same city two days later. Also joining the eclectic gathering of 539 accredited delegates were adherents of other political organizations, including the Non-Partisan League, the Northwest Farmers' National Council, the Triple Alliance of the Northwest, the Consumers' League, and other organizations.

Lack of harmony was evident from the outset, with incompatible programmatic goals and Presidential desires evident, the Single Taxers insistent upon a Single Tax plank in the new party's platform and threatening to bolt the convention if the favorite of the Committee of 48, "Fighting Bob" La Follette of Wisconsin, were to be nominated to head the ticket. Simultaneously, closed door unity negotiations were begun between representatives of the Committee of 48 and the Labor Party with a view to joining the two conventions in a new organization to challenge the so-called "old parties" of American politics, the Democratic Party and the Republican Party.

The unification effort was quickly on the rocks, however, as two days of preparatory meetings of conference committees of the two organizations proved unable to agree upon a common program. Bad feelings were in evidence, with at least one member of the Labor Party charging the Committee of 48 with being "plutocratic philanthropists trying to use the Labor Party." Moreover, the "Forty-Eighters" found themselves internally divided between a more conservative bloc based in the East, including top organizational leaders J.A.H. Hopkins, Allen McCurdy, and Amos Pinchot, and a more radical segment of newcomers hailing largely from the Western states, the most prominent spokesman for whom was lawyer Dudley Field Malone.

The matter of central difference between the two groups related to the proposed unified organization's position on nationalization of industry, with the Labor Party camp and the Western radical members of the Committee of 48 in favor of the proposition while the Eastern leadership of the "Forty-Eighters" deeming the matter "pre-revolutionary idealism" that was far in advance of political realities. Rumors circulated that Western adherents of the Committee of 48 believed their Eastern-based leadership, clearly unhappy with the direction in which the convention was headed, to be stalling unity negotiations in order to bring the unity convention to a stalemate and thereby preserve their organizational independence and personal control.

On July 12, the first day of their own scheduled convention, Labor Party activists at the convention therefore issued the Committee of 48 an ultimatum: to either proceed with amalgamation the next day on terms suitable to the Labor Party or else the Labor Party would forward alone, nominating its own candidate for President of the United States and writing its own program in its own name. The Hopkins-McCurdy-Pinchot bloc refused this proposition, and no unification of the two rival organizations was achieved. The Labor Party of the United States went on to nominate Utahn Parley Parker Christensen to head its ticket and conducted its own campaign in the 1920 campaign.

The Eastern leaders of the Committee of 48 attempted to put the best face on their inability to construct a unified third party for the November 1920 election, with Allen McCurdy declaring the failure to have been "inevitable," while counterintuitively declaring that the inability of the July conventions to unite having revealed "more clearly than ever the necessity for a new party." In McCurdy's view, unification had failed owing to the failure of the convention to accept the desires of "the responsible leadership of the Committee of 48" to establish a "great coalition party" of "believers in American progress," in which organized labor would play only a part. Instead, influenced by the British Labour Party, the adherents of the Labor Party of the United States had opted for a "class party devoted to the interests of the workers alone."

McCurdy declared:

"It is the conviction of the leaders of the Committee of 48 that the rank and file of the workers of the United States of America do not know what guild socialism is, do not believe it when they know what it is, and will not follow a political leadership which has this end in view."

The Committee of 48 would continue its efforts to establish a new progressive political party, but on its own terms.

=== Activity in the Conference for Progressive Political Action ===
Over the course of the next two years, members of the Committee of 48 gave support to various insurgent progressive politicians in their campaigns for election. Some of these successful candidacies included the Senatorial campaigns of Non-Partisan League Republican Lynn Frazier in North Dakota and progressive Republican Robert B. Howell in Nebraska, the re-election of La Follette in Wisconsin, and the Gubernatorial campaign of Charles W. Bryan in Nebraska.

Executive Chairman J.A.H. Hopkins saw this success of these and other progressive candidacies in the 1922 election to be indicative of a groundswell of support for a new political party to challenge the Republicans and Democrats in an organized manner, announcing to the press that plans were underway for the calling of yet another national convention to launch a new political movement.

=== Dissolution and legacy ===
The failure of the Committee of 48 to establish a viable new progressive capitalist political party owing its own ideological timidity was foreseen even in 1920, when one discouraged Single Tax adherent noted of the failed unity effort of July 1920:

"[J.A.H. Hopkins of the Committee of 48] does not seem to see that the Farmer-Labor Party did not fail, but did just what it went to Chicago to do. It formed a political party. It matters not whether this party is large or small. It carried its program through victoriously, and the estimable bourgeoisie comprising the Committee of 48, for whom these hardened persons never had anything but the most thinly veiled contempt, melted away when the burning glass at Carmen's Hall [LP convention site] turned its fierce intensive rays toward the Hotel Morrison [48ers convention site]....

"Mr. Hopkins still thinks an amalgamation possible on the basis of the [Committee of 48's] St. Louis platform. That platform has a labor plank for collective bargaining; labor laughs at it. It has a plank for government ownership of railroads and public utilities; the Socialists are already in the field and go the 48ers a lot better. It has a Single Tax plank, or a plank for the taxation of idle land to force it into use; the Single Tax Party is in the field with a full Single Tax program. The St. Louis platform is a painfully strained dilution of issues that are now before the country, presented by men who are not afraid of their convictions. The program of the 48 Committee is chiefly interesting to the disembodied ghosts of the Chartists of the early ’40s."

By 1923, the Committee of 48 had become defunct.

== Prominent members ==
- Herbert S. Bigelow
- McAlister Coleman
- Albert DeSilver
- Will Durant
- Zona Gale
- Charlotte Perkins Gilman
- Swinburne Hale
- Arthur Garfield Hays
- John Haynes Holmes
- Frederic C. Howe
- B. W. Huebsch
- Rush H. Limbaugh, Sr.
- Robert Morss Lovett
- Dudley Field Malone
- Amos Pinchot
- Ordway Tead
- Carl D. Thompson
- Ina Phillips Williams

== External sources ==
- The Committee of Forty-Eight: For a Conference of Americans Who are Equally Opposed to Reaction and Violent Revolution: Its Purposes — And the Reasons for It. New York: The Committee of Forty-Eight, n.d. [1919].
- Platform of the Committee of 48: Unanimously Adopted at the First National Conference, St. Louis, Missouri, Dec. 9-12, 1919: Together with Supporting Argument, Resolutions, and Methods of Political Procedure. New York: The Committee of 48, n.d. [1919].
- The Call to a National Conference of American Men and Women. New York: The Committee of 48, n.d. [1920].
- Allen McCurdy, Wanted — A Ballot Box. New York: The Committee of 48, n.d. [1920]. —Committee of Forty-Eight Pamphlets No. 1.
- Frederick William Pethwick-Lawrence, Hand and Brain. New York: The Committee of 48, n.d. [1920]. —Committee of Forty-Eight Pamphlets No. 2.
- J.W. McConaughy, The Bishops and Industrial Civilization. New York: The Committee of 48, n.d. [1920]. —Committee of Forty-Eight Pamphlets No. 3.
- Edgar Lee Masters, The New Star Chamber: An Analysis of the Use of the Injunction in Strikes First Published in 1904. New York: The Committee of 48, n.d. [1920]. —Committee of Forty-Eight Pamphlets No. 4.
- Amos Pinchot, A New Party Needed... New York: The Committee of 48, n.d. [1920]. —Committee of Forty-Eight Pamphlets No. 5.
