= Chris Swecker =

American lawyer

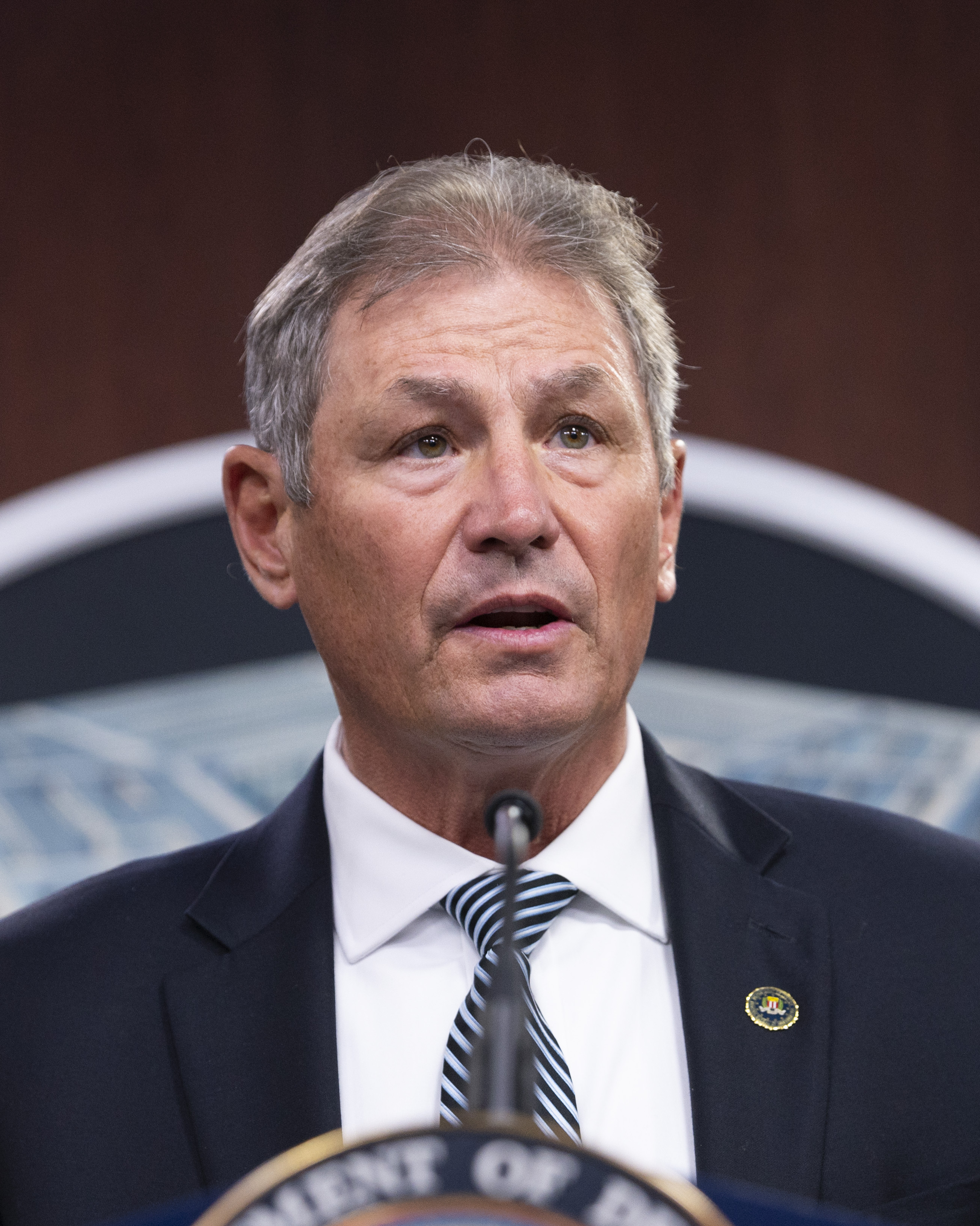
- Swecker in 2020

Assistant Director of the Federal Bureau of Investigation
- In office 2004–2006

Personal details
- Born: July 14, 1956 (age 70) Ferrol, Spain
- Education: Appalachian State University (BA); Wake Forest University (JD)

Chris Swecker (born July 14, 1956, in Ferrol, Spain) is a Spanish-born American attorney and law enforcement officer who served as assistant director of the Federal Bureau of Investigation for the Criminal Investigative Division from 2004 to 2006. He later established a law practice in Mecklenburg County, North Carolina, and was appointed by North Carolina Governor Pat McCrory as chairman of the Governor's Crime Commission in 2013.

== Education ==
Swecker earned a bachelor's degree from Appalachian State University in 1978, followed by a Juris Doctor from the Wake Forest University School of Law in 1981.

== Career ==
Swecker served in the Federal Bureau of Investigation for 24 years. In 2003, he served as the FBI's on-scene Commander in Iraq, and later served as Special Agent in Charge of North Carolina Operations, where he managed the capture of Eric Rudolph after the Centennial Olympic Park bombing, and dismantling a Hezbollah terrorist cell.

Swecker served as Corporate Security Director for Bank of America from July 2006 to January 2009. He has also appeared as a guest on CNN, CNBC, and Fox News. Swecker was also featured in The Staircase, in which he provided testimony for an appeal made by Michael Peterson.
