= Rachel Harrison (computer scientist) =

British computer scientist and software engineer

Rachel Harrison is a British computer scientist and software engineer whose research interests include mobile apps and object-oriented design. She is a professor of computer science at Oxford Brookes University.

== Education and career ==
Harrison has master's degrees in mathematics from the University of Oxford and in computer science from University College London, and a Ph.D. in computer science from the University of Southampton. Before joining Oxford Brooks, she has been professor and head of the computer science department at the University of Reading, and a consultant in the computing industry. At Oxford Brookes University, she leads the Applied Software Engineering Group.

In 2009, Harrison became editor-in-chief of the Software Quality Journal, a position she still holds as of 2020.
