= La Balize, Louisiana =

Colonial French fortification and settlement in Louisiana

La Balize
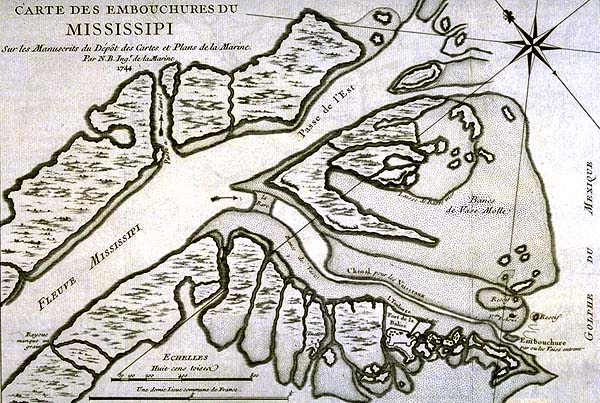
- 1744 French map of the Mississippi Delta East Pass, showing Fort de la Balize on the lower right
- Nickname: Pilotsville
- Interactive map of La Balize
- Coordinates: 29°07′21″N 89°06′26″W

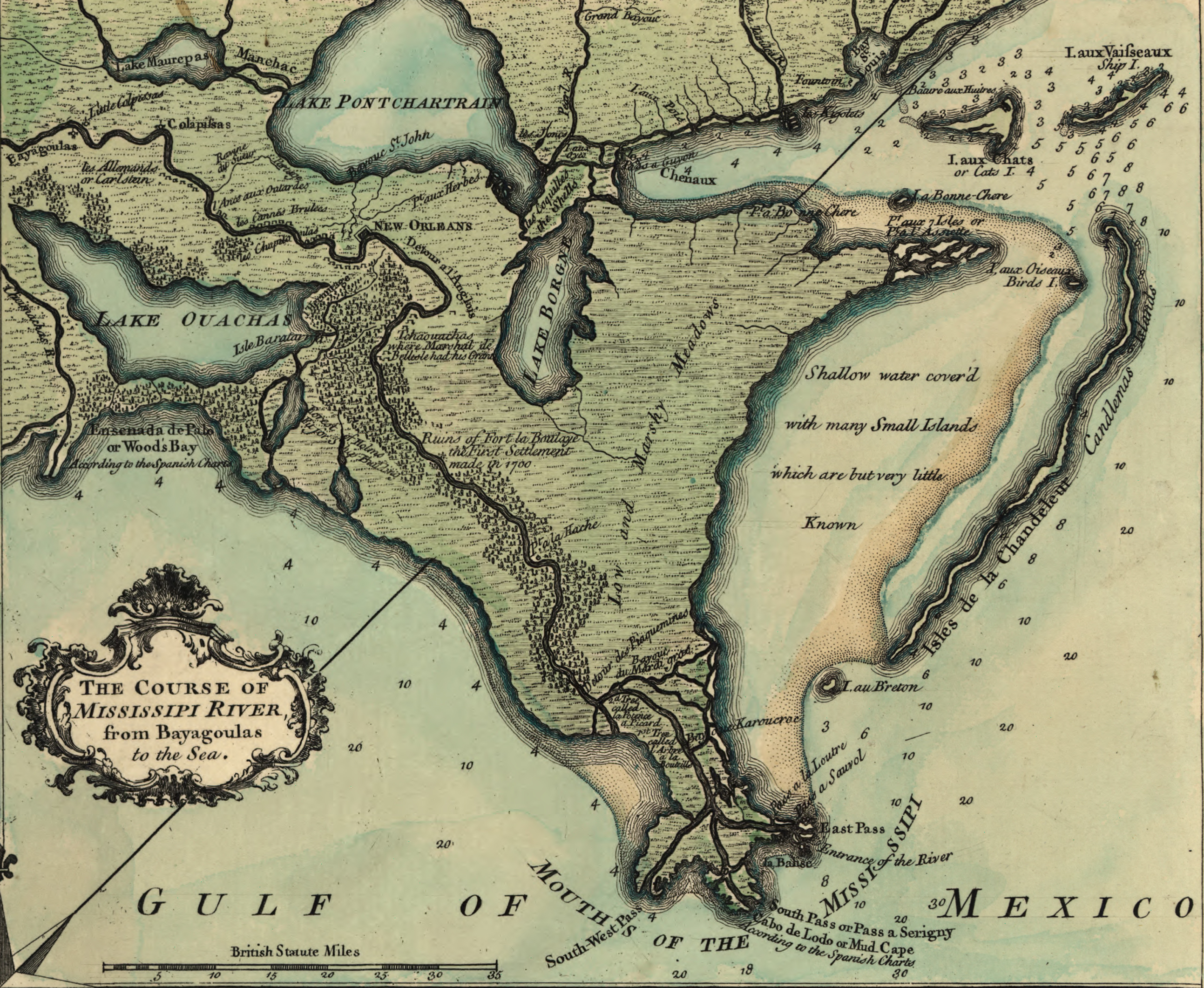
1720 map shows location of the East Pass and La Balize

La Balize, Louisiana was a French fort and settlement near the mouth of the Mississippi River, in what later became Plaquemines Parish. The village's name (also spelled La Balise) meant "seamark." La Balize was historically and economically important for overseeing the river. It was rebuilt several times because of hurricane damage. The active delta lobe of the river's mouth is called the Balize Delta, after the settlement, or the Birdfoot Delta, because of its shape.

La Balize was inhabited chiefly by fishermen, river pilots, and their families. The pilots were critical to helping ships navigate to and from the port of New Orleans through the shifting passages, currents, and sandbars of the river's delta front. The village was vulnerable to seasonal hurricanes. Washed away in a hurricane of 1740, the village was rebuilt on the newly emerged island of San Carlos. That village in turn was damaged severely several times and finally destroyed.

By 1853 also called Pilotsville, the village of La Balize was rebuilt about five miles (8 km) to the northwest in the Southwest Pass, on the west bank of the Mississippi. That village was taken down by wind and a storm surge of the September 14–15 hurricane of 1860. La Balize was abandoned, and a new pilots' settlement was constructed about five miles (8 km) upriver on the east bank of the Mississippi, just above the Head of the Passes. The new village was named Pilottown.

== History ==
When the explorer Robert de La Salle claimed the land in 1682 for the French crown, he identified this site near the mouth of the Mississippi as important. It was at a point just above two major forks in the river, so passage could be controlled. A map drawn about 1720 showed the mouth of the Mississippi with the different forks of the river, and the isle and fort of La Balize. By 1721, the French had constructed a 62-foot (19 m)-high wooden pyramid as la balize at the settlement. It sat relatively high above the mud and marshes of the delta wetlands.

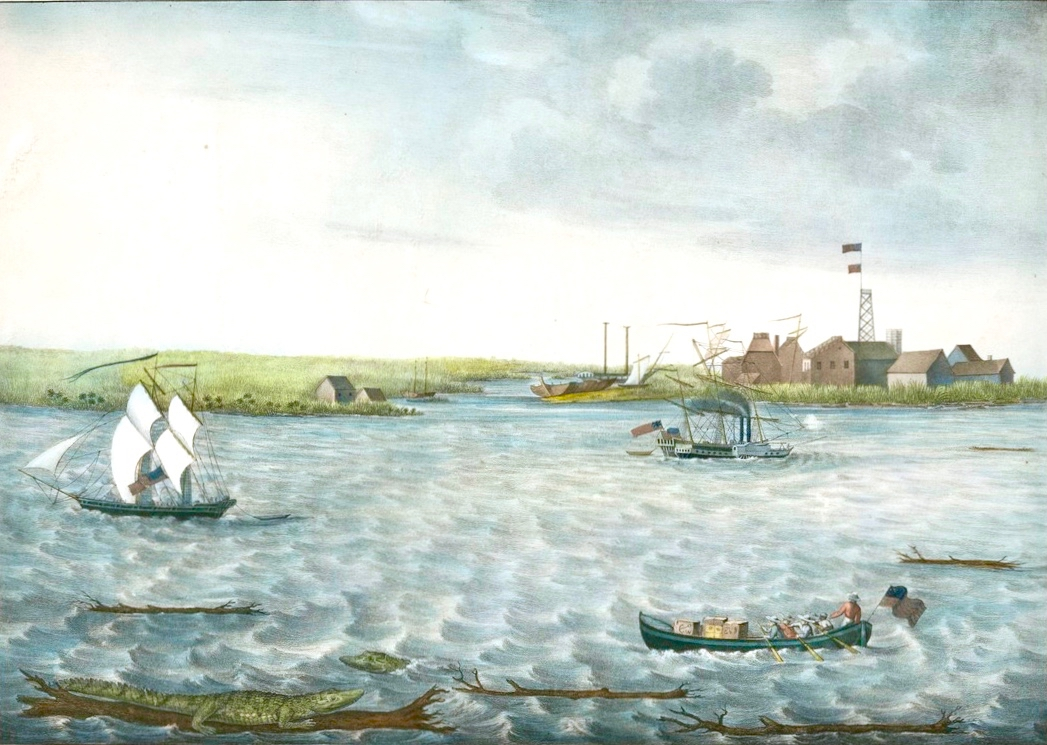
La Balize in 1828

By 1722 the center of the French colony was in New Orleans. In the early 18th century, the Roman Catholic Church quickly established seven pioneer parishes in the Louisiana colony, among them the parish at La Balize, founded in 1722. The French also founded four pioneer parishes in early villages of what are now Mississippi and Alabama. After the establishment of La Balize, the King commissioned Nicolas Godefroy Barbin to serve as the "Garde Magazin" (chief administrator) there. That commission, signed in 1703 by the King and his minister Jérôme Phélypeaux comte de Pontchartrain, was significant in that it recognized the strategic importance of La Balize.

Despite the vulnerability of the low-lying site to hurricanes, the French and later the Spanish needed to control the mouth of the Mississippi and have a place where pilots could meet the ships. They always rebuilt. The complicated conditions on the Mississippi River required ships to have river pilots to help them navigate the bar, with its changing currents, mud and sandbars, and avoid going aground. After the Americans took control of the territory by the Louisiana Purchase in 1803, they sometimes called the village Pilotsville. With the advent of steam tugboats in the 19th century, the pilots had more power to maneuver oceangoing ships in the river.

Not only did hurricanes destroy the settlements, but engineers started working early to try to improve entry at the river mouth. In 1726 French engineers dragged an iron harrow through sandbanks to make it easier for ships to pass the bar. Other elements which pilots and captains had to deal with at the mouth of the Mississippi were changing passages. The main ship passage changed four times before 1888. In 1750, the main passage was at the Northeast Pass (part of Pass á Loutre), then in succession it was at Southeast Pass (also in Pass á Loutre), Southwest Pass, and South Pass. The main ship passage is again in the Southwest Pass.

Historical records for La Balize documented the long struggle of the French, Spanish and Americans to maintain this critical site at the delta front:

- 1740 - La Balize was destroyed in a hurricane. A new island arose which was called San Carlos. The village was built again on San Carlos.
- October 7–10, 1778 - La Balize was destroyed, but was rebuilt at this location.
- July 25–28, 1819 - Ships anchored near La Balize suffered through a 24-hour gale, but only three were grounded.
- 1831 - La Balize suffered major damage.
- April 3–4, 1846 - This was the most damaging storm since that of 1831. It was a hurricane-like storm but likely not of tropical origins, given the time of year. It cut a new channel between Cat Island and its lighthouse

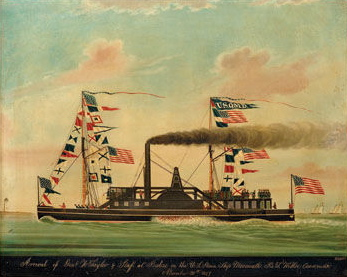
U.S. Steam Ship Monmouth returns U.S. General Zachary Taylor from victories in the war with Mexico at Balize, Louisiana, November, 1847

- By 1853 La Balize had been relocated to the Southwest Pass, where it was built on the western bank about five miles (8 km) northwest of its first location.
- September 15–16, 1855 - At Cat Island the lighthouse keeper's house was destroyed and the lighthouse imperiled. Almost everything else was swept away in the storm surge.
- August 11, 1860 - In the first hurricane of the season, trees were uprooted and up to 10 feet (3.0 m) of water flooded the region of La Balize.
- September 14–15, 1860 - The second hurricane struck at the mouth of the Mississippi and destroyed La Balize. Tides were six feet above the high-water mark. The village was abandoned and rebuilt upriver at what became Pilottown.
- October 2–3, 1860 - In the third hurricane of the season, there was widespread damage as far inland as Baton Rouge.
- September 13, 1865 - Although La Balize had been abandoned since 1860, this hurricane destroyed the last traces of the village.

The hurricanes of 1860 persuaded the pilots and their families to rebuild further upriver, which they did about five miles (8 km) away, on the east bank of the Mississippi. The new settlement was named Pilottown. At its peak of population in the 19th century, it had about 800 residents. A school for children operated into the 20th century. Today the pilots usually stay there only temporarily for work shifts.

Little of La Balize remains today. In the early 20th century, only a rusted iron tomb marking the site remained.

== Literature ==
Travelers found the Mississippi delta an astonishing area. In her Domestic Manners of the Americans (1833), Fanny Trollope captured her first perceptions as her ship entered the area of the river:

Large flights of pelicans were seen standing upon the long masses of mud which rose above the surface of the waters, and a pilot came to guide us over the bar, long before any other indication of land was visible.

I never beheld a scene so utterly desolate as this entrance of the Mississippi. Had Dante seen it, he might have drawn images of another Bolgia from its horrors.

One only object rears itself above the eddying waters; this is the mast of a vessel long since wrecked in attempting to cross the bar, and it still stands, a dismal witness of the destruction that has been, and a boding prophet of that which is to come.

By degrees bulrushes of enormous growth become visible, and a few more miles of mud brought us within sight of a cluster of huts called the Balize, by far the most miserable station that I ever saw made the dwelling of man, but I was told that many families of pilots and fishermen lived there.

Élisée Reclus, a young Frenchman who later became a renowned geographer and anarchist, recounted his trip up the Mississippi in early 1853, describing his impression of the village of la Balize:

The village of Pilotsville, whose plank shacks are built on the left bank [of the Mississippi River], is generally known by the name of Balize. In reality, this name belongs to another village founded by French settlers on the southeast pass, but since the southwest pass has become the main mouth of the Mississippi, the pilots have transported both their industry and the name of their miserable village there. There are certainly few places in the world that look as sad and desolate as la Balize. The narrow strip of earth where the houses are grouped is at the same time the shore of the river and that of the sea; the salty waves and the swells of freshwater cover it in turn and meet each other there in a labyrinth of ditches filled with a viscous and corrupted mixture; everywhere a bulge of the spongy earth allows plants to attach their roots, wild canes and reeds grow there in impenetrable thickets. The shacks are made of planks that are as light as possible in order that they not sink in the soaked ground, and, so that the moisture can penetrate them less, they are perched on high stilts as if on perches. Also, when the storm wind blows and the waves of the sea come one after another tumbling into the river over the offshore bar, the houses of la Balize could well be swept away if they were not moored like ships; sometimes even the village comes to drag on its anchors. Fevers and death emerge incessantly from the blanket of miasmas spread out over la Balize. Yet, four hundred Americans have the courage to perch in these shacks and sleep off their fever there, in the hope of being able to rob passing ships.

== See also ==
- Fort De La Boulaye
- Fort Jackson
- Fort St. Philip
