= Rachel Harris Larson =

American chemist

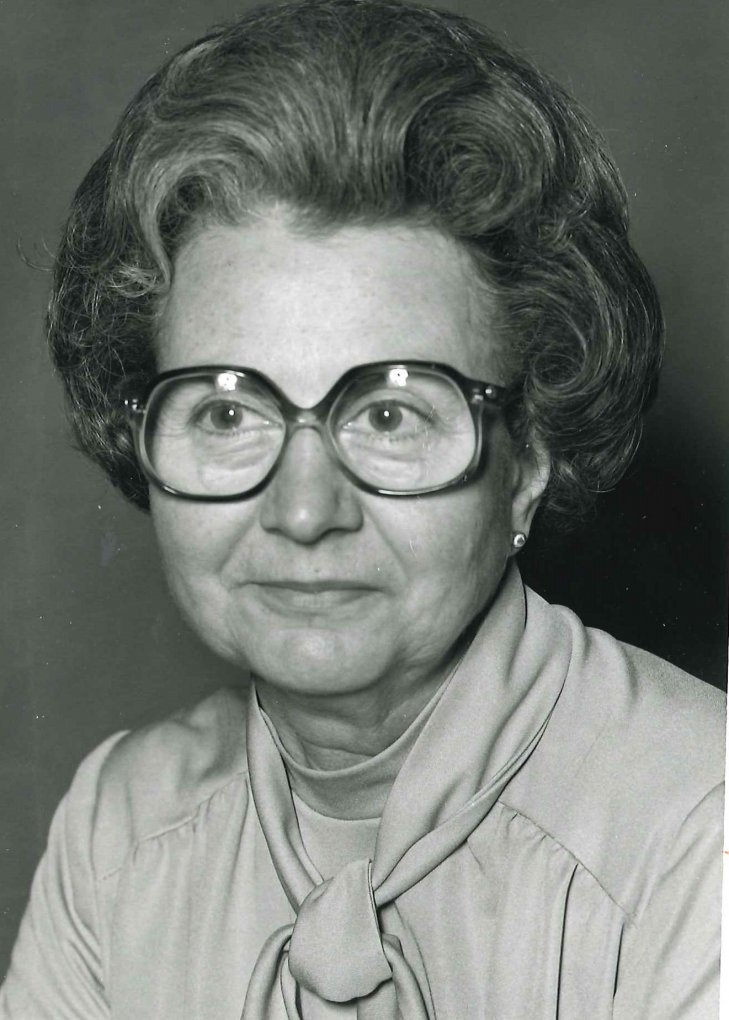
- Born: Rachel Harris; Wake Forest, North Carolina, US
- Education: Appalachian State Teacher's College; Georgetown University
- Scientific career
- Fields: Chemistry, dental research
- Workplaces: National Institute of Dental and Craniofacial Research
- Thesis: Ethylenediaminetetraacetic acid as a caries potentiating agent in the rat (1958)

Rachel Harris Larson (née Harris) was an American chemist and dental researcher who studied the interrelationships of genetics, nutrition, and bacteriology in dental caries. She was the first female scientist at the National Institute of Dental and Craniofacial Research where she worked from 1942 until her retirement in 1977.

== Early life and education ==
A native of Wake Forest, North Carolina, Rachel Harris Larson was the oldest daughter and had 4 siblings. She graduated from Appalachian State Teacher's College and worked as a social worker and mathematics and general science teacher. In the summer of 1943, after her younger sister Dorothy "Dot" Murphy graduated from business college, she received a civil service appointment in Washington, D.C. Larson decided to accompany her sister and look for a job in chemical research. She started working as a laboratory technician in the industrial hygiene laboratory at the National Institutes of Health (NIH). Larson worked by day at the NIH laboratories; nights and weekends, she studied toward her M.S. and Ph.D. degrees in chemistry at Georgetown University. Her 1958 dissertation was titled Ethylenediaminetetraacetic acid as a caries potentiating agent in the rat.

== Career and research ==
Larson was the first female scientist at the National Institute of Dental and Craniofacial Research (NIDR) where she researched in the dental caries section. Larson's studies at the NIDR on the interrelationships of genetics, nutrition, and bacteriology in dental caries in experimental animals brought her international recognition. She was a fellow of the American College of Dentists and presented a DHEW superior service honor award. Larson and her sister retired from NIH in 1977.

== Personal life ==
Larson met her husband, Philip Larson on a cruise in Bermuda. She was widowed after 10 years of marriage. She remarried in 1971 to John W. Henry but continued to use the surname Larson to retain her established identity in the scientific community and literature. After retirement, she did volunteer work in the Washington area and spent time with husband at their mountain cottage near Front Royal, Virginia.
