= Mississippi River Pilot =

A Mississippi River pilot is responsible for guiding ships along the Mississippi River, including across the bar from the Gulf of Mexico, through the shifting sandbars and passages at the mouth, and upriver to New Orleans and Baton Rouge.

On the Lower Mississippi River, the Associated Branch Pilots supplies River Pilots between the Gulf of Mexico and Pilottown, Louisiana. The Crescent River Port Pilots Association supplies River Pilots between Pilottown and New Orleans, Louisiana, and the New Orleans-Baton Rouge Steamship Pilots Association supplies River Pilots between New Orleans and Baton Rouge, Louisiana.

The Associated Federal Pilots and Docking Masters of Louisiana are pilots who deal strictly with US Flagged vessels and operate from Southwest Pass to Baton Rouge, the longest transit of the 4 pilot associations in the river.
