= Washington's 20th legislative district =

American legislative district

Coordinates: 46°30′N 122°30′W

Map of Washington's 20th legislative district

Washington's 20th legislative district is one of forty-nine districts in Washington state for representation in the state legislature.

The district includes a southern section of Thurston County, most of Lewis and Cowlitz counties, and the northern tip of Clark County.

This mostly rural district is represented by state senator John Braun and state representatives Peter Abbarno (position 1) and Ed Orcutt (position 2), all Republicans.

== History ==
The 20th District has not always been located in southwest Washington. For example, as of 1917, when Republican Ina Phillips Williams took one of the House seats, it represented Yakima County in central Washington.

== Members ==
- Rose Bowman (1989–1993)

== See also ==
- Washington Redistricting Commission
- Washington State Legislature
- Washington State Senate
- Washington House of Representatives
- Washington (state) legislative districts
