= Boothville-Venice, Louisiana =

Boothville-Venice
- Former census-designated place
- Location of Boothville-Venice in Louisiana
- Coordinates: 29°19′04″N 89°23′25″W
- Country: United States
- State: Louisiana
- Parish: Plaquemines

Area
  - Total: 5.1 sq mi (13 km^{2})
  - Land: 2.6 sq mi (6.7 km^{2})
  - Water: 2.5 sq mi (6.5 km^{2})
- Elevation: −3 ft (−0.91 m)

Population (2000)
  - Total: 2,220
  - Density: 850/sq mi (330/km^{2})
- Time zone: UTC-6 (CST)
  - Summer (DST): UTC-5 (CDT)
- Area code: 504

Boothville-Venice is a former census-designated place (CDP) in Plaquemines Parish, Louisiana, United States, which includes the unincorporated communities of Boothville, Venice, and Orchard. The population was 2,220 at the 2000 census. For the 2010 census, Boothville-Venice was split into the CDPs of Boothville and Venice.

Boothville is the most populous and northernmost of these communities, all located along Louisiana Highway 23 on the West Bank of the Mississippi River. Boothville is home to the Boothville Heliport, important in helicopter transport for offshore oil rigs in the Gulf of Mexico. Venice is the town farthest south along Highway 23 within the protection levee. Neighboring Orchard (sometimes considered part of Venice) is outside of the protection levee; it has a boat marina and buildings raised on stilts. The Boothville-Venice area also includes the community of Tidewater, to the west of Orchard on a secondary road; port and petroleum facilities dominate Tidewater, which also has a weather station.

== History ==
=== Hurricane Katrina ===
Boothville is near to where Hurricane Katrina made landfall on August 29, 2005. According to the Baton Rouge Advocate, little was left standing in either Boothville or Venice, the few buildings that survived had water up to the rooftops, and the area orange groves had also been submerged. The only building for almost 40 miles (64 km) that weathered the storm with minimal damage was Boothville-Venice High School. It was built after Hurricanes Betsy and Camille on concrete stilts 14 feet (4.3 m) above ground to protect classrooms from storm surge, and it was designed with tall, narrow windows to lessen the risk of broken windows from flying debris. The school was reopened in 2006 as Boothville-Venice Elementary School.

== Geography ==
Boothville-Venice is located at 29°19′4″N 89°23′25″W (29.317853, -89.390416).

According to the United States Census Bureau, the CDP has a total area of 5.1 square miles (13 km^{2}), of which 2.6 square miles (6.7 km^{2}) is land and 2.5 square miles (6.5 km^{2}) (49.01%) is water.

== Demographics ==
Historical population
Census	Pop.	Note	%±
1990	2,743		—
2000	2,220		−19.1%
U.S. Decennial Census; 1960 1970 1980; 1990 2000 2010

Boothville-Venice first appeared as a census designated place in the 1990 U.S. census; the CDP was split into the Boothville CDP and Venice CDP before the 2010 U.S. census.

As of the census of 2000, there were 2,220 people, 746 households, and 584 families residing in the CDP. The population density was 863.2 inhabitants per square mile (333.3/km^{2}). There were 933 housing units at an average density of 362.8 per square mile (140.1/km^{2}). The racial makeup of the CDP was 61.94% White, 28.74% African American, 3.38% Native American, 4.01% Asian, 0.27% from other races, and 1.67% from two or more races. Hispanic or Latino of any race were 1.22% of the population.

There were 746 households, out of which 41.6% had children under the age of 18 living with them, 58.3% were married couples living together, 14.2% had a female householder with no husband present, and 21.7% were non-families. 19.0% of all households were made up of individuals, and 5.9% had someone living alone who was 65 years of age or older. The average household size was 2.96 and the average family size was 3.38.

In the CDP, the population was spread out, with 31.7% under the age of 18, 10.1% from 18 to 24, 28.6% from 25 to 44, 22.1% from 45 to 64, and 7.5% who were 65 years of age or older. The median age was 32 years. For every 100 females, there were 104.2 males. For every 100 females age 18 and over, there were 100.9 males.

The median income for a household in the CDP was $33,813, and the median income for a family was $42,823. Males had a median income of $35,385 versus $18,571 for females. The per capita income for the CDP was $13,123. About 11.8% of families and 17.3% of the population were below the poverty line, including 17.4% of those under age 18 and 21.7% of those age 65 or over.

== Education ==
Plaquemines Parish School Board operates the public schools of the parish.

It is served by Boothville-Venice Elementary School in Boothville and South Plaquemines High School in Buras. Prior to 2005 Boothville-Venice High School served the community, but Hurricane Katrina damaged the building.
