= Bradley Sylve =

American football player (born 1993)

No. 3
- Position: Cornerback

Personal information
- Born: January 29, 1993 (age 33); Port Sulphur, Louisiana, U.S.
- Listed height: 6 ft 0 in (1.83 m)
- Listed weight: 180 lb (82 kg)

Career information
- High school: South Plaquemines (Plaquemines Parish, Louisiana)
- College: Alabama
- NFL draft: 2016: undrafted

Career history
- Buffalo Bills (2017)*; New Orleans Saints (2017)*; Birmingham Iron (2019); DC Defenders (2020); Los Angeles Wildcats (2020); Philadelphia Stars (2022)
- * Offseason or practice squad member only
- Stats at Pro Football Reference

Bradley Sylve (born January 29, 1993) is an American former professional football cornerback. He played college football for the Alabama Crimson Tide, and was signed by the Buffalo Bills as an undrafted free agent in 2017.

== College career ==
Sylve spent 2011–2015 at Alabama primarily in the reserve, logging 40 tackles (9 on special teams) and 7 pass breakups. He started 3 games in 2013, one game in 2014, and was one of the Alabama's four Special Teams Players of the Year. With the Crimson Tide, Sylve won 2 BCS National Championship Games, in 2011 and 2012.

The day before Alabama's Pro Day in 2016, he suffered a torn Achilles tendon.

== Professional career ==
=== Buffalo Bills ===
On April 7, 2017, Sylve was signed by the Buffalo Bills. He was waived on September 1.

=== New Orleans Saints ===
On September 20, 2017, Sylve was signed to the New Orleans Saints' practice squad. On October 10, he was cut. On January 5, 2018, Sylve was signed to a reserve/futures contract with the Saints. He was waived on May 14, 2018.

=== Birmingham Iron ===
Sylve was signed to the Birmingham Iron in 2019 and competed in 8 games before the Alliance of American Football folded on April 2, 2019. He recorded 30 tackles and two interceptions, picking off Mike Bercovici of the San Diego Fleet & Matt Simms of the Atlanta Legends.

=== DC Defenders ===
Sylve was drafted by the DC Defenders in the 5th round in phase 4 of the 2020 XFL draft. In his first career game with the Defenders, Sylve picked off Brandon Silvers and took it back, marking the first defensive touchdown in the XFL. The Defenders would defeat the Seattle Dragons 31–19.

=== Los Angeles Wildcats ===
On February 14, 2020, Sylve was traded to the Los Angeles Wildcats in exchange for Anthony Johnson. He had his contract terminated when the league suspended operations on April 10, 2020.

=== Philadelphia Stars ===
Sylve was selected in the 11th round of the 2022 USFL draft by the Philadelphia Stars. After suffering an ankle injury before the start of the regular season, he was transferred to the team's practice squad on April 16, 2022. He remained on the inactive roster on April 22, 2022, with the injury. He was transferred to the active roster on May 5. He was transferred back to the inactive roster on May 14. On February 23, 2023, Sylve was released by the Stars.
