= Boothville, Louisiana =

- Census-designated place
- Location within Louisiana Location within the United States
- Coordinates: 29°20′37″N 89°25′11″W
- Country: United States
- State: Louisiana
- Parish: Plaquemines

Area
  - Total: 3.723 sq mi (9.64 km^{2})
  - Land: 2.149 sq mi (5.57 km^{2})
  - Water: 1.574 sq mi (4.08 km^{2})
- Elevation: −3.3 ft (−1 m)

Population (2020)
  - Total: 718
  - Density: 334/sq mi (129/km^{2})
- Time zone: UTC-6 (Central (CST))
  - Summer (DST): UTC-5 (CDT)
- ZIP Code: 70038
- Area code: 504
- FIPS code: 22-08710
- GNIS feature ID: 533330

Boothville is an unincorporated community and census-designated place in Plaquemines Parish, Louisiana, United States. Its population was 854 as of the 2010 census, and 718 at the 2020 U.S. census.

Jeré Longman of The New York Times stated that before Hurricane Katrina in 2005 the community served as "a hub of the fishing and oil and gas industries; as of September 2023 the Times listed it as "(inundated").

== History ==
Boothville was named for Colonel Booth, a landowner.

== Demographics ==
Historical population
Census	Pop.	Note	%±
2010	854		—
2020	718		−15.9%
U.S. Decennial Census

Boothville first appeared in the 2010 U.S. census split out along with the Venice CDP from the deleted Boothville-Venice CDP.

Boothville CDP, Louisiana – Racial and ethnic composition Note: the US census treats Hispanic/Latino as an ethnic category. This table excludes Latinos from the racial categories and assigns them to a separate category. Hispanics/Latinos may be of any race.
Race / Ethnicity (NH = Non-Hispanic)	Pop 2010	Pop 2020	% 2010	% 2020
White alone (NH)	515	376	60.30%	52.37%
Black or African American alone (NH)	205	144	24.00%	20.06%
Native American or Alaska Native alone (NH)	21	16	2.46%	2.23%
Asian alone (NH)	52	35	6.09%	4.87%
Native Hawaiian or Pacific Islander alone (NH)	1	0	0.12%	0.00%
Other race alone (NH)	0	2	0.00%	0.28%
Mixed race or Multiracial (NH)	52	91	6.09%	12.67%
Hispanic or Latino (any race)	8	54	0.94%	7.52%
Total	854	718	100.00%	100.00%

Boothville first appeared as a census designated place in the 2010 U.S. census, with a population of 854. At the following decennial census, its population declined to 718.

== Education ==
Plaquemines Parish School Board operates the public schools of the parish.

It is served by Boothville-Venice Elementary School in Boothville and South Plaquemines High School in Buras. Prior to 2005 Boothville-Venice High School (PreK-12) served the community, but Hurricane Katrina damaged the original building.

Plaquemines Parish is in the service area of Nunez Community College.
