= Port Sulphur, Louisiana =

- Unincorporated community Census-designated place
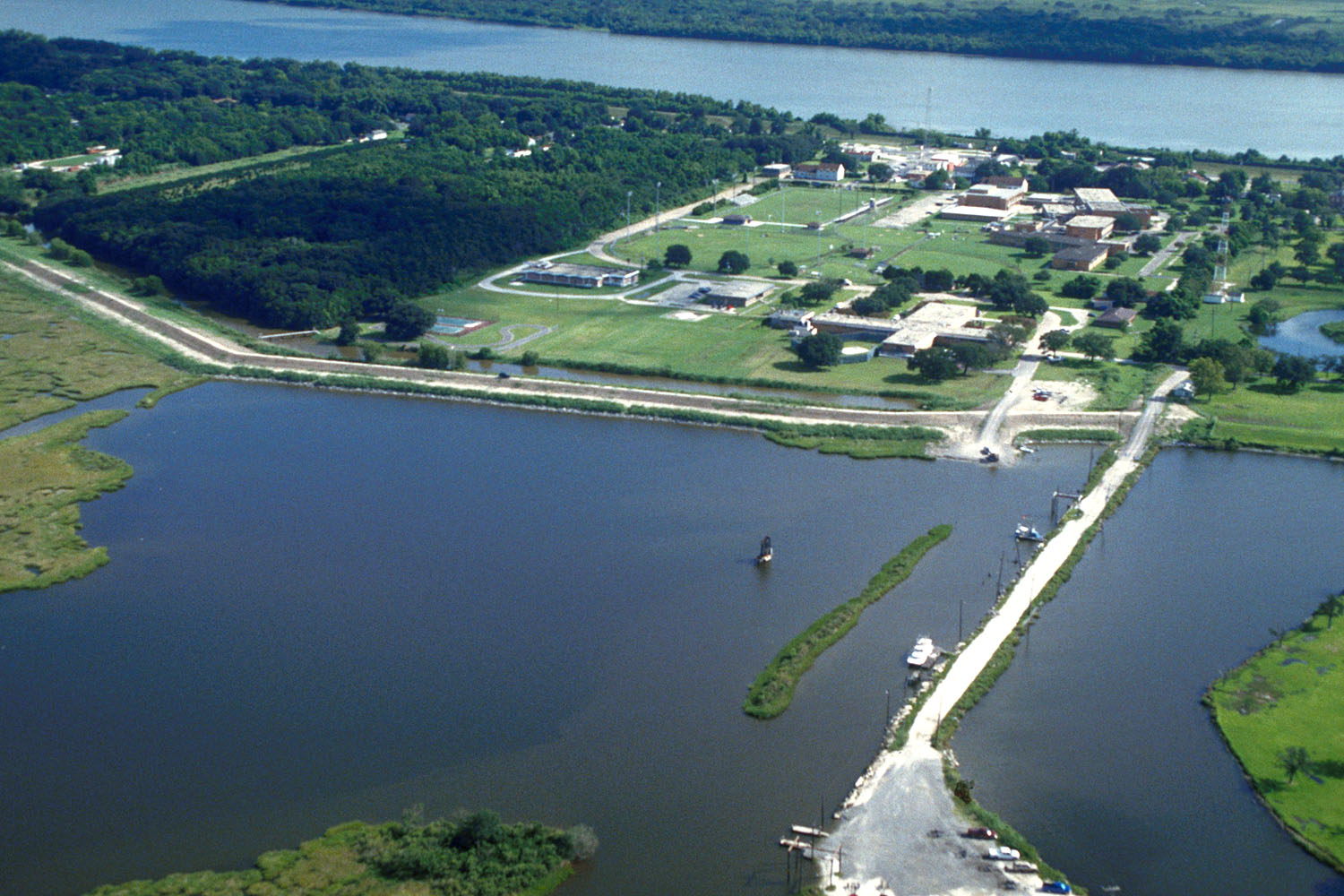
- Aerial view of Port Sulphur, Louisiana on the Mississippi River

- Location of Port Sulphur in Louisiana
- Coordinates: 29°29′40″N 89°42′45″W
- Country: United States
- State: Louisiana
- Parish: Plaquemines

Area
  - Total: 8.41 sq mi (21.78 km^{2})
  - Land: 5.41 sq mi (14.02 km^{2})
  - Water: 3.00 sq mi (7.77 km^{2})
- Elevation: 3 ft (0.91 m)

Population (2020)
  - Total: 1,677
  - Density: 309.9/sq mi (119.65/km^{2})
- Time zone: UTC-6 (CST)
  - Summer (DST): UTC-5 (CDT)
- ZIP code: 70083
- Area code: 504
- FIPS code: 22-62070

Port Sulphur is an unincorporated community on the West Bank of the Mississippi River in Plaquemines Parish, Louisiana, United States. For statistical purposes, the United States Census Bureau has defined the community as a census-designated place (CDP) which at the 2020 census, it had a population of 1,677.

== Etymology ==
The name for the community derives from the Freeport Sulphur Company in the early 1930s, when it set up logistics, refining, storage and shipping operations to support its Frasch Process sulphur mine at Lake Grande Ecaille, located 10 miles west of the town in the nearby marsh. The Grande Ecaille mine was among the largest sulphur deposits in the world when it began operation in 1933, and remained in production until 1978. Over time, as other discoveries were made, the Freeport Sulphur Company also used the Port Sulphur facility to support their other Frasch Process sulphur mines located at Garden Island Bay, Lake Pelto, and Caillou Island; a land-based mine at Chacahoula; the first offshore sulphur mines at Grand Isle and Caminada Pass; and a large operation 50 miles offshore from the Mississippi River Delta in 300 feet of water, at Main Pass Block 299 in the Gulf of Mexico. The facility was also used to process and ship recovered sulphur obtained by oil and gas refining. The terminal was able to filter and store liquid hot molten sulphur in large insulated heated tanks, and "vat" liquid sulphur into acres of long term dry storage by forming blocks of bright yellow sulphur by spraying molten sulphur into metal forms on the ground and allowing to cool. The site is valuable because of its proximity to sulphur producing areas near the Gulf of Mexico, its docking sites along the Mississippi River and back bay marsh.

== History ==
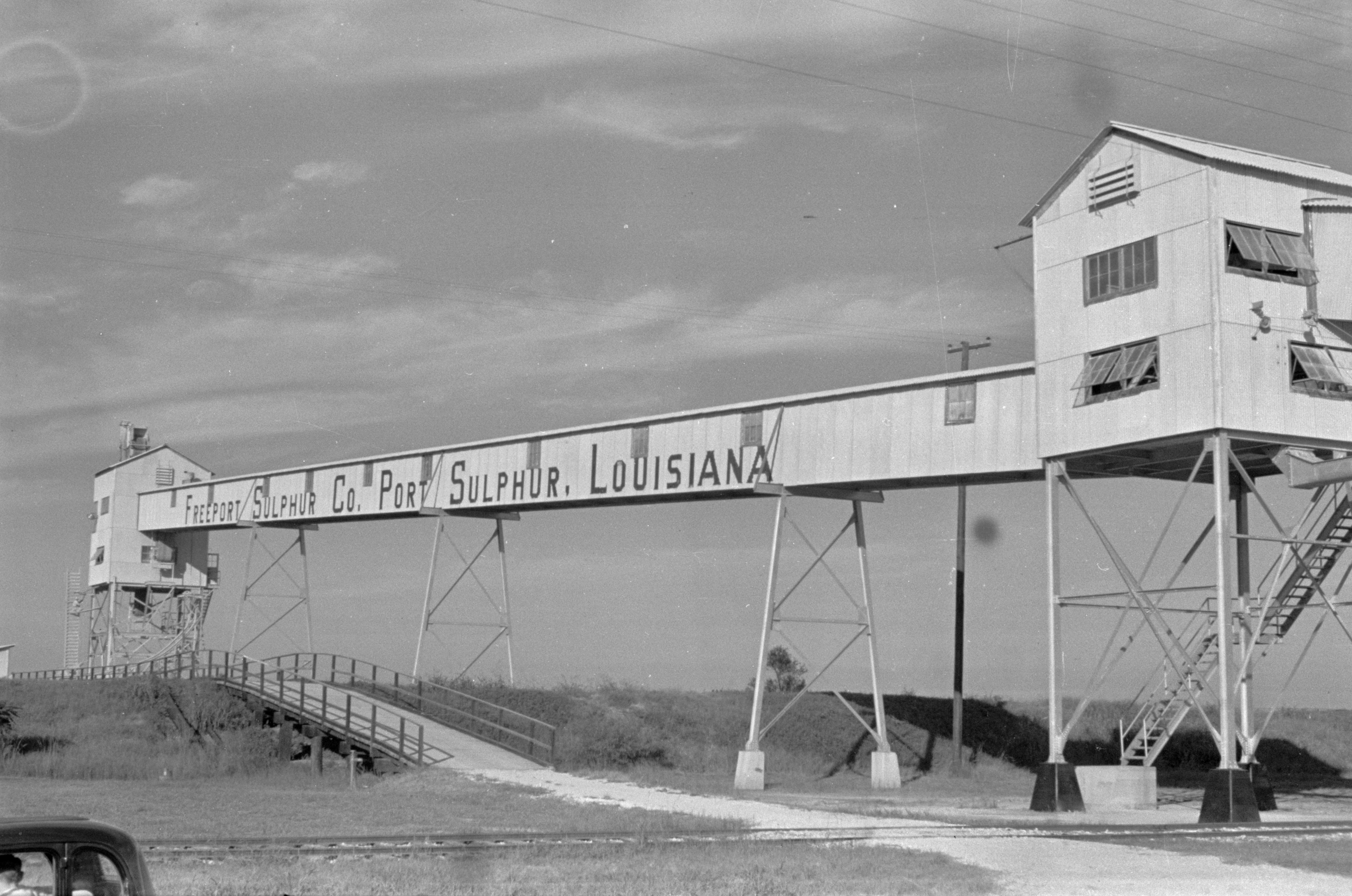
1935

Port Sulphur was originally a typical company town, with its residents and civic life closely tied to the Freeport Sulphur Company. As the company divested itself of much of the town property and governance, it became more of a regular town with private individual land ownership. As the number of employees at the site dwindled, the Freeport Company became less important in everyday life and economic activity. At some point, most of the company-owned land not necessary for the sulphur operation was transferred to Plaquemines Parish or sold to private owners. The economic fortunes of the Freeport Sulphur Company declined during the 1980s and 1990s, resulting from the competitive forces of recovered Sulphur processed from sour oil & gas. In the early 2000s Freeport Sulphur shut down operations, as the price of sulphur dropped too low because large amounts of sulphur recovered during petroleum refining and from Canadian natural gas exploration were dumped on the international sulphur market. With inexpensive recovered sulphur in large supply, the large scale and expensive Frasch Process sulphur mining and storage operations proved to be uneconomical and were discontinued. The Freeport-McMoRan Port Sulphur facility was closed and sold. Hurricane Katrina destroyed much of what was left of the sulphur facility in August 2005, with a few buildings remaining.

The large brick Plaquemines Parish Government building located on Louisiana Highway 23 (LA 23) in town next to the former Freeport property was originally the Freeport Sulphur Company administration building. The Port Sulphur school and other buildings located around the Civic Drive area were originally located on company property and are oriented towards the former Freeport Property. Much of the original town buildings were sold or removed, and much of the original town site sits mostly vacant empty land, with a large stand of oak trees on the former Freeport Property next to the Plaquemines Government building. An historical marker about Port Sulphur is located in front of the Government Building. The golf course land located on LA 23, just south of the former Freeport property, was originally a neighborhood of the company townsite. The land was later donated to the Plaquemines Parish Government.

The town began to struggle economically after Freeport Sulphur Mine ended its business in the town.

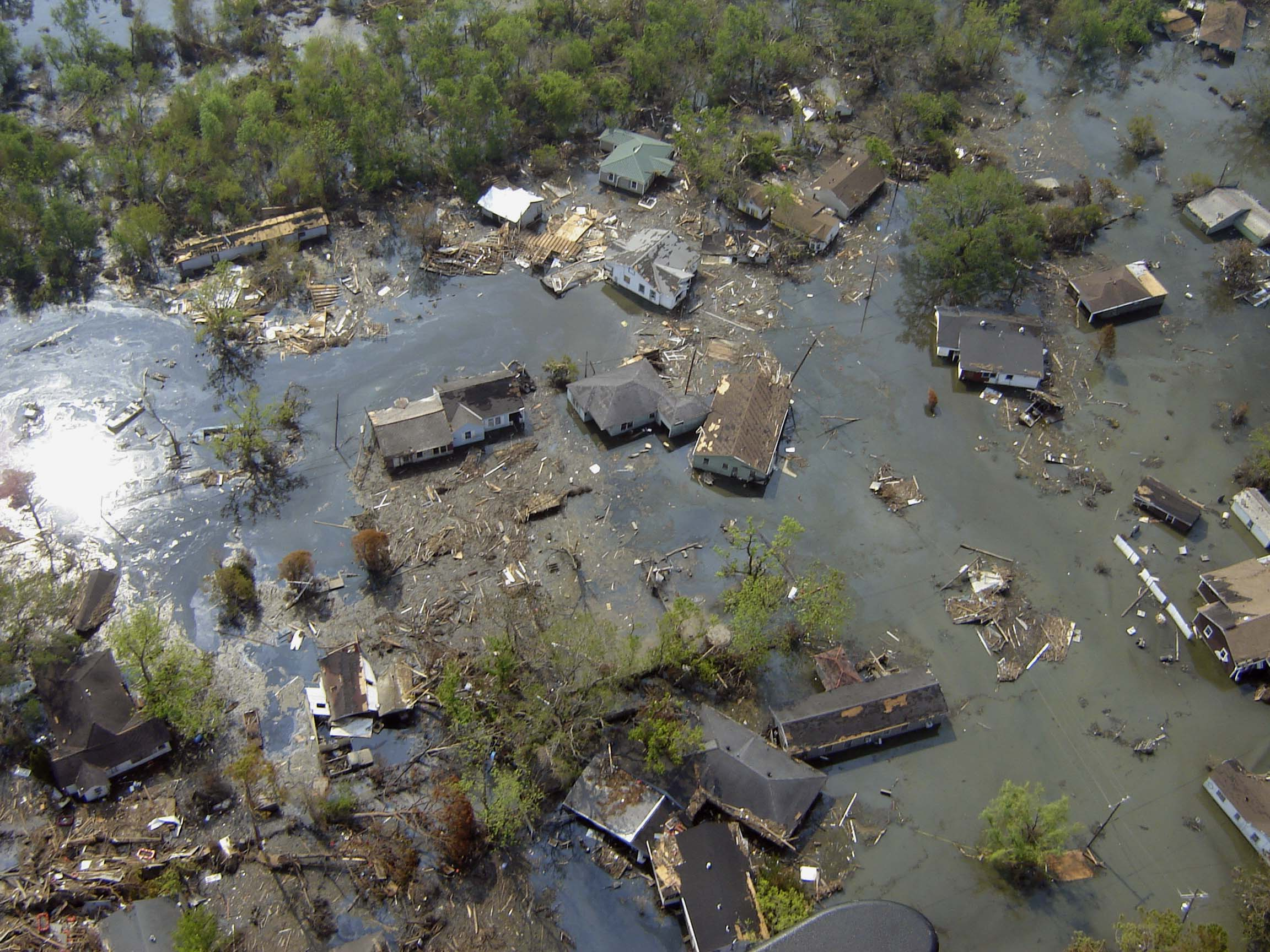
Residential section after Katrina

The town is 8 feet (2.4 m) above sea level and had not flooded during Hurricane Betsy nor Hurricane Camille. Before Hurricane Katrina and Hurricane Rita about 3,000 people lived in Port Sulphur. Nevertheless, during Hurricane Katrina, the federal levees failed and around 22 feet (6.7 m) of water engulfed the town. Almost all single-family homes in the town were destroyed, many of which were moved off their foundations by as much as 100 feet. In the months following Katrina, some residents moved back to Port Sulphur in trailers and modular homes provided by the Federal Emergency Management Agency. But many residents relocated to other parts of Louisiana, the Southeast, and Texas.

By November 2006, in the post-Katrina period, the post office and several businesses had reopened, and Highway 23 had some street lights added. By December 2007 there were about 1,500 residents of Port Sulphur and the majority of the small businesses resumed operations. Due to the usage of modular buildings and trailers in the period, Jeré Longman described it as "a feel of impermanence and uncertainty."

== Geography ==
According to the United States Census Bureau, the CDP has a total area of 8.5 square miles (22 km^{2}), of which 5.5 square miles (14 km^{2}) is land and 3.0 square miles (7.8 km^{2}) (35.29%) is water.

Located nearby is Fucich Bayou.

== Demographics ==
Historical population
Census	Pop.	Note	%±
1950	1,255		—
1960	2,868		128.5%
1970	3,028		5.6%
1980	3,318		9.6%
1990	3,523		6.2%
2000	3,115		−11.6%
2010	1,760		−43.5%
2020	1,677		−4.7%
U.S. Decennial Census; 1950 1960 1970 1980; 1990 2000 2010

Port Sulphur first appeared as an unincorporated place in the 1950 U.S. census under the name Potash-Port Sulphur and as Port Sulphur in the 1960 U.S. census. Port Sulphur was redesignated as a census designated place in the 1980 United States census.

Port Sulphur CDP, Louisiana – Racial and ethnic composition Note: the U.S. census treats Hispanic/Latino as an ethnic category. This table excludes Latinos from the racial categories and assigns them to a separate category. Hispanics/Latinos may be of any race.
Race / Ethnicity (NH = Non-Hispanic)	Pop 2000	Pop 2010	Pop 2020	% 2000	% 2010	% 2020
White alone (NH)	1,404	419	356	45.07%	23.81%	21.23%
Black or African American alone (NH)	1,379	1,136	1,013	44.27%	64.55%	60.41%
Native American or Alaska Native alone (NH)	219	90	74	7.03%	5.11%	4.41%
Asian alone (NH)	19	25	57	0.61%	1.42%	3.40%
Native Hawaiian or Pacific Islander alone (NH)	0	0	1	0.00%	0.00%	0.06%
Other race alone (NH)	18	28	37	0.58%	1.59%	2.21%
Mixed race or Multiracial (NH)	46	26	81	1.48%	1.48%	4.83%
Hispanic or Latino (any race)	30	36	58	0.96%	2.05%	3.46%
Total	3,115	1,760	1,677	100.00%	100.00%	100.00%

In 2020, the CDP had a population of 1,677.

== Government and infrastructure ==
The United States Postal Service operates a post office.

== Education ==
Plaquemines Parish School Board operates the public schools of the parish. The district formerly had an office in Port Sulphur.

It is served by South Plaquemines Elementary School in Port Sulphur; and South Plaquemines High School in Empire, near Buras.

Prior to 2005 Port Sulphur High School (PK-12) served the community, but Hurricane Katrina damaged the original building.

The Plaquemines Parish Library maintains the Port Sulphur Branch.
