= Buras-Triumph, Louisiana =

Buras-Triumph
- Former Census-designated place
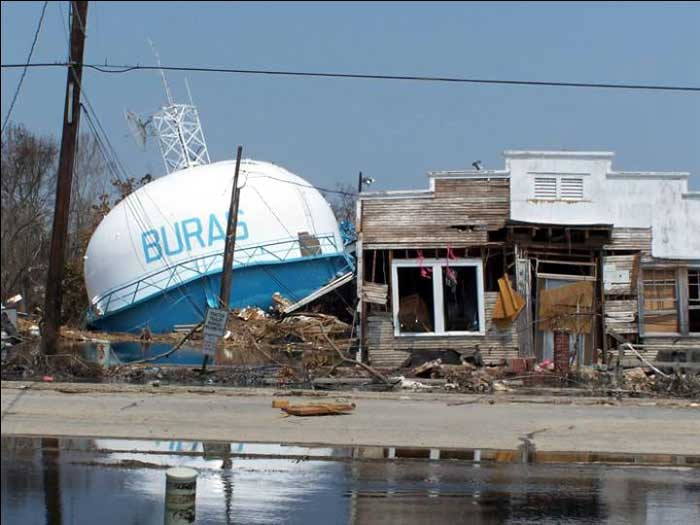
- Fallen water tower following Hurricane Katrina

- Location of Buras-Triumph in Louisiana
- Coordinates: 29°21′06″N 89°30′50″W
- Country: United States
- State: Louisiana
- Parish: Plaquemines

Area
  - Total: 7.2 sq mi (19 km^{2})
  - Land: 5.0 sq mi (13 km^{2})
  - Water: 2.2 sq mi (5.7 km^{2})
- Elevation: 3 ft (0.91 m)

Population (2000)
  - Total: 3,358
  - Density: 670/sq mi (260/km^{2})
- Time zone: UTC-6 (CST)
  - Summer (DST): UTC-5 (CDT)
- Area code: 504

Buras-Triumph is a former census-designated place in Plaquemines Parish, Louisiana, United States. The population was 3,358 at the 2000 census. For the 2010 census, Buras-Triumph was split into the CDPs of Buras and Triumph. On the peninsula, Buras has been located higher, with Triumph located southeast of Buras.

== History ==
The town of Buras was established, informally, in the 1840s. Several small settlements on the West Bank of the Mississippi River north of Fort Jackson became known collectively as the Quartiers des Burats, the Burat Settlement, anchored on the property of Sebastian Burat, near where Cazezu Boulevard meets Parish Highway 11 today. Burat was later anglicized to Buras. In 1854, the Buras Post Office was established, along with a regular mail route by packet boat on the river. By 1864, a new church, Our Lady of Good Harbor, was established in Buras as the community grew.

=== Civil War ===
In April 1862, during the American Civil War, the Battle of Forts Jackson and St. Philip took place near Buras. Union Flag Officer David Farragut led a fleet up the river to capture New Orleans and engaged the forts in the early morning hours of April 23. A single Union vessel, the USS Varuna, was sunk near Buras in an engagement with the Confederate steamer CSS Governor Moore and the CSS Stonewall Jackson. The heavily damaged Governor Moore also sank, not far from its Union opponent.

=== 20th century ===
In the first decades of the 20th century, Buras' primary industries were oyster fishing and citrus farming. In the 1930s, petroleum was discovered in the region, along with natural gas and sulfur. One of the first producing fields was established in Quarantine Bay, east of Buras, by the Gulf Oil Company. With the coming of the oil and gas industries, Buras began to slowly evolve from a farming and fishing village into a larger community.

=== Hurricanes ===
Buras-Triumph and the surrounding communities have been subjected to many devastating hurricanes over the years, including the 1893 Cheniere Caminada hurricane, which destroyed the original church, the 1901 Louisiana hurricane, the 1915 New Orleans hurricane, Hurricane Betsy in 1965, and Hurricane Camille in 1969.

More recently, this area was the location where, on August 29, 2005, the eye of Hurricane Katrina first made landfall in Louisiana. Although Katrina was one of the costliest natural disasters to strike the U.S., according to the Hurricane Severity Index, at landfall both Betsy and Camille were higher-intensity hurricanes than Katrina. However, the loss of surrounding marsh lands to erosion and subsidence allowed the energy of Hurricane Katrina's storm surge to overtop the levee system and the area was devastated yet again.

Emblematic of the rebuilding and recovery is the new Buras water tower. The image of the previous tower, collapsed in the rubble, was an icon of the destruction Katrina brought. (See photos.)

== Geography ==
Buras-Triumph is located along the west bank of the Mississippi River at 29°21′6″N 89°30′50″W (29.351783, -89.513815) and has an elevation of 3 feet (1 m). Buras-Triumph is within the federal hurricane protection levee system. Approximately 3,000 acres (12 km^{2}) of the area are drained by two stormwater pumping stations, one north of Buras and one in Triumph.

According to the United States Census Bureau, the CDP has a total area of 7.2 square miles (19 km^{2}), of which 5.0 square miles (13 km^{2}) is land and 2.2 square miles (5.7 km^{2}) (30.32%) is water.

== Demographics ==
Historical population
Census	Pop.	Note	%±
1950	1,799		—
1960	4,908		172.8%
1970	4,133		−15.8%
1980	4,137		0.1%
1990	3,702		−10.5%
2000	3,358		−9.3%
U.S. Decennial Census; 1950 1960 1970 1980; 1990 2000 2010

Buras-Triumph first appeared as an unincorporated place in the 1950 U.S. census; and as a census designated place in the 1980 United States census. The CDP was split into the Buras CDP and Triumph CDP prior to the 2010 U.S. census.

Buras-Triumph CDP, Louisiana – Racial and ethnic composition Note: the US Census treats Hispanic/Latino as an ethnic category. This table excludes Latinos from the racial categories and assigns them to a separate category. Hispanics/Latinos may be of any race.
Race / Ethnicity (NH = Non-Hispanic)	Pop 2000	% 2020
White alone (NH)	2,380	70.88%
Black or African American alone (NH)	365	10.87%
Native American or Alaska Native alone (NH)	55	1.64%
Asian alone (NH)	413	12.30%
Pacific Islander alone (NH)	0	0.00%
Other race alone (NH)	37	1.10%
Mixed race or Multiracial (NH)	71	2.11%
Hispanic or Latino (any race)	37	1.10%
Total	3,358	100.00%

As of the census of 2000, there were 3,358 people, 1,146 households, and 850 families residing in the CDP. The population density was 670.9 inhabitants per square mile (259.0/km^{2}). There were 1,408 housing units at an average density of 281.3 per square mile (108.6/km^{2}). The racial makeup of the CDP was 71.68% White, 10.90% African American, 1.67% Native American, 12.30% Asian, 1.28% from other races, and 2.17% from two or more races. Hispanic or Latino of any race were 1.10% of the population.

There were 1,146 households, out of which 40.4% had children under the age of 18 living with them, 53.6% were married couples living together, 12.7% had a female householder with no husband present, and 25.8% were non-families. 20.9% of all households were made up of individuals, and 8.1% had someone living alone who was 65 years of age or older. The average household size was 2.92 and the average family size was 3.40.

In the CDP, the population was spread out, with 30.3% under the age of 18, 10.0% from 18 to 24, 29.7% from 25 to 44, 22.1% from 45 to 64, and 7.9% who were 65 years of age or older. The median age was 32 years. For every 100 females, there were 102.4 males. For every 100 females age 18 and over, there were 105.9 males.

The median income for a household in the CDP was $33,059, and the median income for a family was $41,216. Males had a median income of $35,980 versus $16,917 for females. The per capita income for the CDP was $13,426. About 18.1% of families and 20.7% of the population were below the poverty line, including 23.2% of those under age 18 and 15.2% of those age 65 or over.

== Education ==
Plaquemines Parish School Board operates the public schools of the parish.

It is served by South Plaquemines High School in Buras. Prior to 2005 Buras Middle School and Buras High School served the community, but Hurricane Katrina damaged the buildings.
