= Grand Ecaille, Louisiana =

Island in Louisiana, United States

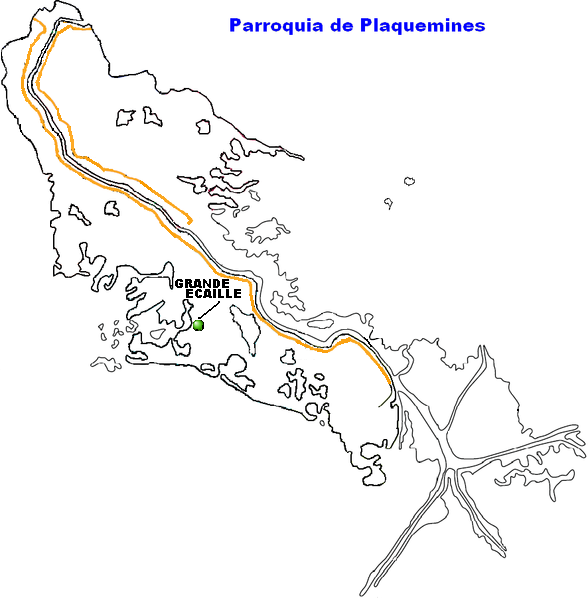
Location of Grande Ecaille within Plaquemines Parish, Louisiana

Grande Ecaille is an island located in the parish of Plaquemines, Louisiana, United States. It is in Lake Grand Ecaille. It was the site of a sulphur factory operated by the Freeport Sulphur Company and built in 1933.

== Geography ==
The island is located at 29°22′48″N 89°46′50″W, approximately 10 miles (16 km) west of Port Sulfur and 71 kilometers from New Orleans. It is only 3 feet (0.91 m) above sea level, making it an area prone to flooding.
