= KNOU =

KNOU may refer to:

- Korea National Open University
- KWMZ-FM, an Empire, Louisiana radio station that held the KNOU call sign from 2001 to 2012
- WFUN-FM, a Saint Louis, Missouri radio station that held the KNOU call sign from 2015 to 2020
- KNX-FM, a Los Angeles, California radio station that held the KNOU call sign in 2021
