= Delta National Wildlife Refuge =

National Wildlife Refuge in Louisiana

- IUCN category IV (habitat/species management area)
- Location within the United States
- Location: Plaquemines Parish, Louisiana
- Nearest city: Venice, Louisiana
- Coordinates: 29.25000°N 89.20000°W
- Area: 49,000 acres (200 km^{2})
- Established: 1935
- Governing body: U.S. Fish and Wildlife Service
- Website: Delta National Wildlife Refuge

Delta National Wildlife Refuge

The Delta National Wildlife Refuge is located 10 miles (16 km) east of Venice, Louisiana along the Mississippi River. The area formed when a breach in the natural levee of the Mississippi River occurred in 1862 approximately 100 miles (160 km) below New Orleans, Louisiana. The 48,000-acre (190 km^{2}) refuge was purchased in 1935 with the primary purpose to provide sanctuary and habitat to wintering waterfowl. Access is by boat only.

== Wildlife and habitat ==
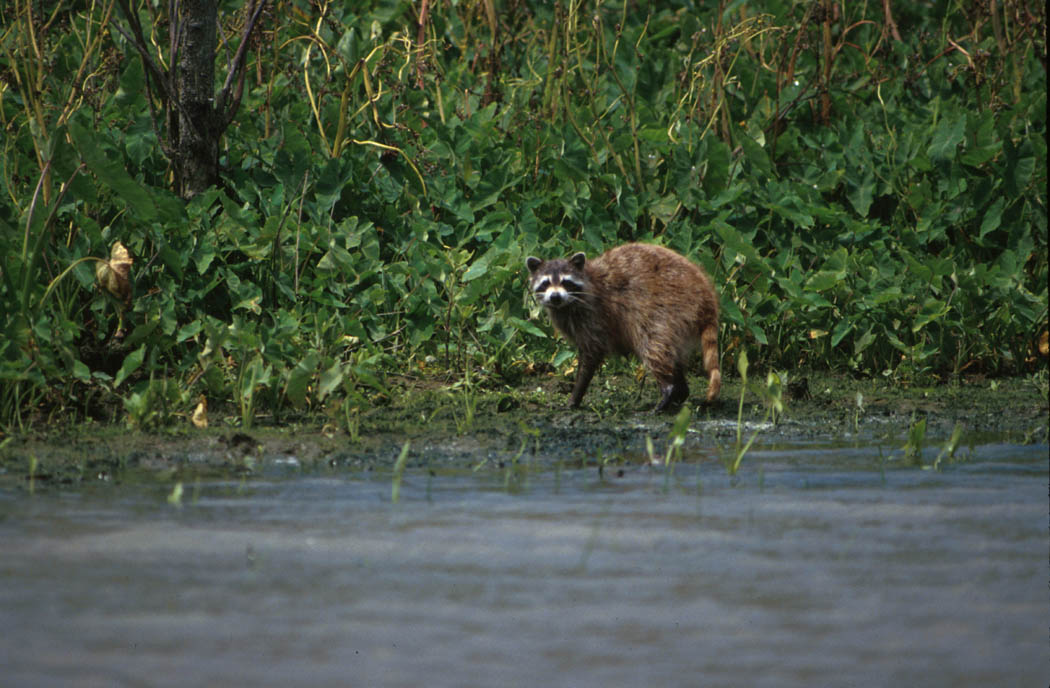
Raccoon photographed in the Delta National Wildlife Refuge in Louisiana

Delta NWR supports a wide variety of wildlife species. Tens of thousands of wintering waterfowl take advantage of the rich food resources found in the delta. Large numbers of other bird species can be found on the refuge, with numbers peaking during the spring and fall migrations. Large numbers of wading birds nest on the refuge, and thousands of shorebirds can be found on tidal mudflats and deltaic splays. Numerous furbearers and game mammals are year-round residents, and the marshes and waterways provide year-round and seasonal habitat for a diversity of fish and shellfish species.

Thousands of shorebirds use the refuge as a wintering area and also as a resting and staging area during migration. Commonly observed species include greater and lesser yellowlegs, long-billed dowitchers, dunlins, western sandpipers, Wilson's plovers, killdeer and willets.

Raptors are a common sight on Delta NWR. The most commonly observed species include American kestrels, northern harriers, red-tailed hawks and turkey vultures. Black vultures, Cooper's hawks, merlins, red-shouldered hawks and sharp-shinned hawks have also been seen on the refuge. Ospreys are common winter visitors to the refuge.

Large numbers of passerine birds (songbirds) utilize the refuge as a resting and staging area during the spring and fall migrations. Deer are frequently observed by the refuge staff on the natural pass banks, manmade spoil banks, and the marshes associated with these features. Swamp rabbits are found over much of the refuge, and populations appear to be stable. A number of fur bearing species make their homes on Delta NWR. The most abundant of these is the nutria.

The marshes and waterways of the Delta NWR support a diversity of fish species. Speckled trout, redfish, flounder, blue crabs and shrimp are important saltwater species found on the refuge. Catfish, largemouth bass, and various sunfish species are found in the freshwater areas of the refuge. Delta NWR is an extremely important nursery area for both fresh and saltwater fish species.

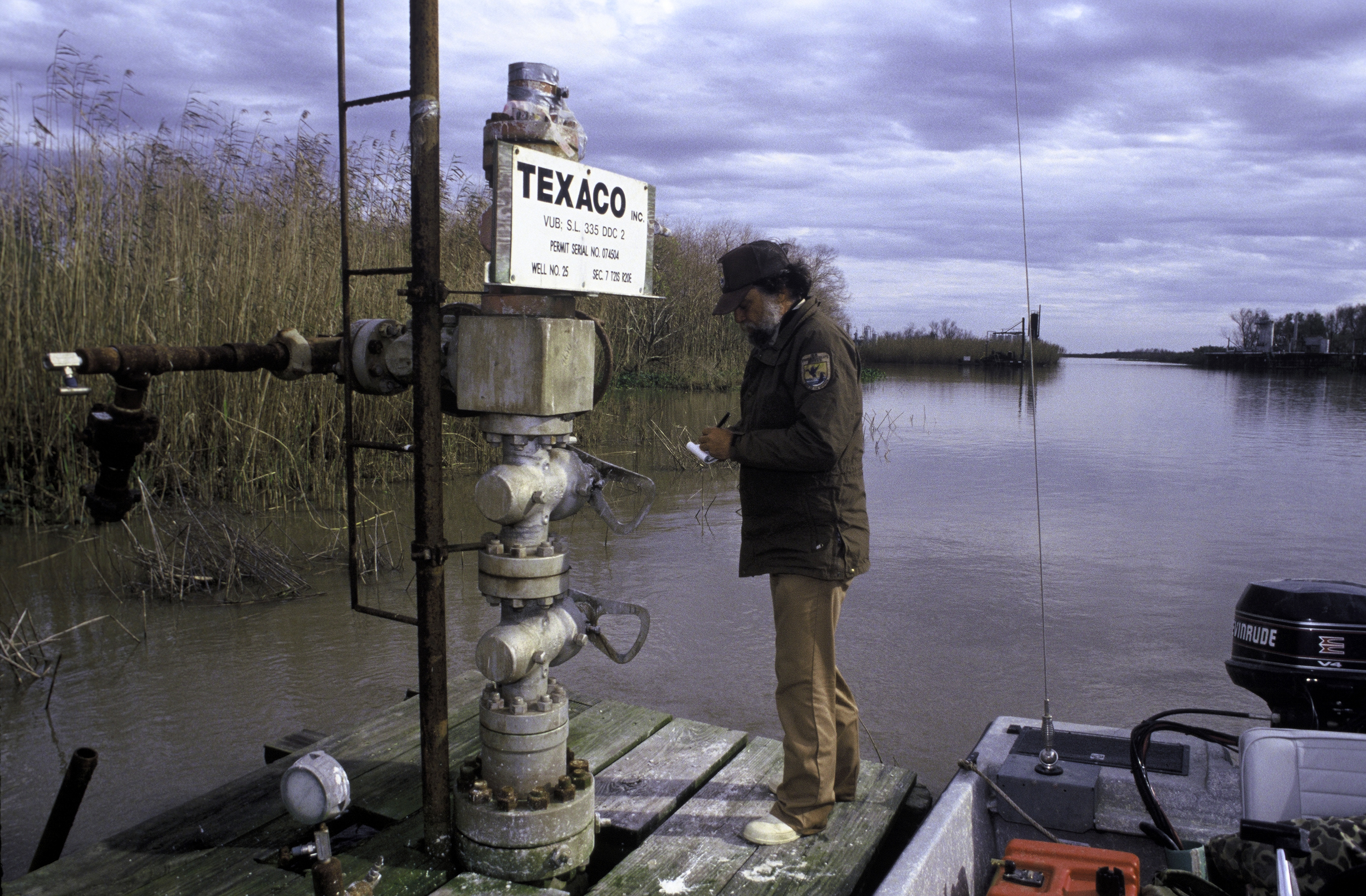
Checking oil well on Delta National Wildlife Refuge

The marsh habitat on the refuge is classified as Paulustrine Emergent Wetlands. Two basic marsh zones occur within the habitat: fresh marsh nearest the main tributaries, and brackish marsh near the Gulf of Mexico. The fertile soils, vegetative composition, and shallow water wetland environment offers outstanding recreational opportunities such as fishing, wildlife observation, photography, hunting, and primitive camping. It provides protection and habitat to numerous plant and wildlife species including the following endangered and threatened species; the American alligator, brown pelican, Arctic peregrine falcon and the piping plover. Untold numbers of passerine birds "song birds" and shorebirds use the refuge as a staging area during migration periods. Waterfowl counts in excess of 400,000 ducks and geese present on the refuge during peak population periods have been recorded.

The fresh marsh is located primarily on mineral soil and to a very limited extent, on floatons (i.e., floating mats of emergent vegetation). Approximately 60% of the refuge consists of the fresh marsh zone. The predominant plants are delta duck potato (Sagittaria platyphylla), elephant ear (Colocasia antiquorum), wild millet (Echinochloa crus-galli), delta three-square (Scirpus deltarum), and roseau cane (Phragmites sp.). The marsh is tidally influenced and water levels fluctuate from a few inches to a foot or more. The fertile soils, vegetative composition and shallow water environment create a highly productive habitat for fish and wildlife.

== Hurricane damage ==
Delta National Wildlife Refuge took a direct hit from Hurricane Katrina. Facilities at the refuge sub-headquarters located in Venice were severely damaged. The refuge itself was also changed in many ways, as it has over the years when hurricanes and tropical storms have hit the area. Marsh and beach areas were eroded, trees were blown down or damaged, debris was washed onto the refuge and vegetation was stressed by saltwater intrusion. Several oil spills and a grounded barge impacted the refuge.

Camping is no longer allowed on Delta National Wildlife Refuge.

== Deepwater Horizon oil spill ==
The oil slick from the explosion of Deepwater Horizon reached the reserve. The spill was larger in size than the Exxon Valdez oil spill.

== See also ==
- List of National Wildlife Refuges: Louisiana
