= Empire, Louisiana =

- Census-designated place
- Location of Empire in Louisiana
- Coordinates: 29°23′55″N 89°36′31″W
- Country: United States
- State: Louisiana
- Parish: Plaquemines

Area
  - Total: 7.61 sq mi (19.72 km^{2})
  - Land: 5.22 sq mi (13.51 km^{2})
  - Water: 2.40 sq mi (6.21 km^{2})
- Elevation: 3 ft (0.91 m)

Population (2020)
  - Total: 905
  - Density: 173.5/sq mi (66.98/km^{2})
- Time zone: UTC-6 (CST)
  - Summer (DST): UTC-5 (CDT)
- ZIP Code: 70050
- Area code: 504
- FIPS code: 22-23725

Empire is a census-designated place (CDP) in Plaquemines Parish, Louisiana, United States. The population was 905 at the 2020 census.

== Seafood production ==
Empire, along with Venice, is the third largest seafood port in the United States by weight and value"(NOAA, 2016)".(Landings by Port Ranked by Pounds, NOAA, 2016). Some two thousand boats home port from Empire. Species landed include oysters, shrimp, menhaden, and other types of fin fish. During the BP oil spill, seafood landings came to a halt. Oyster landings did not resume for an entire year. Under the Coast 2050 plan, a 50,000 cfs freshwater diversion is proposed at Empire, which threatens the livelihood of the fishermen and the supporting businesses by drastically altering the salinity in the surrounding marshes.

== Hurricane Katrina ==
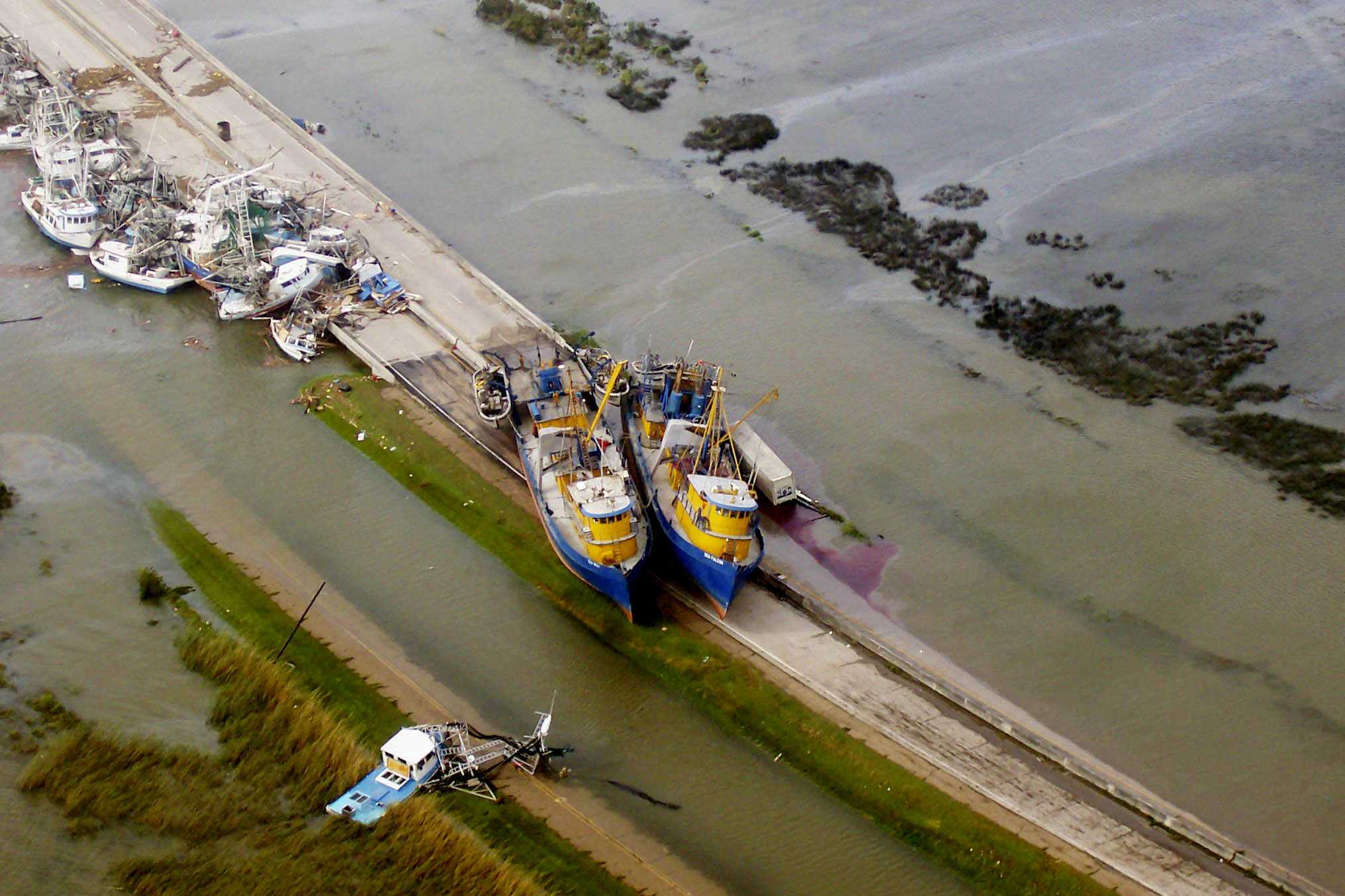
Fishing boats grounded near Empire, Louisiana after Hurricane Katrina

During the afternoon of August 28, 2005, Hurricane Katrina approached the northern coastline of the Gulf of Mexico, generating tropical force winds along coastal areas of Florida, Alabama, Mississippi and Louisiana. At 6:10 a.m., on August 29, 2005, Katrina made landfall just a few miles southeast of Empire, at Buras-Triumph. Many shrimp and oyster boats were grounded along the roads and levees near Empire. On the morning of August 29, the eye of the storm passed over Empire. The area was entirely flooded, causing dozens of boats that had popped their moorings to settle near the southern foot of the Empire High Rise Bridge. As a result, all traffic coming into or out of southern Plaquemines Parish was routed over the draw bridge on Parish Highway 11 (the old alignment of Louisiana Highway 23). Many notable businesses such as Tom's Place Oyster Bar and The Delta Marina were destroyed.

== Geography ==
Empire is located at 29°23′55″N 89°36′31″W (29.398586, -89.608501) and has an elevation of 3 feet (0.9 m).

According to the United States Census Bureau, the CDP has a total area of 7.6 square miles (20 km^{2}), of which 5.2 square miles (13 km^{2}) is land and 2.4 square miles (6.2 km^{2}) (31.49%) is water.

== Education ==
It is in the Plaquemines Parish School Board school district.

South Plaquemines High School is in the CDP.

Plaquemines Parish is in the service area of Nunez Community College.

== Demographics ==
Historical population
Census	Pop.	Note	%±
1990	2,654		—
2000	2,211		−16.7%
2010	993		−55.1%
2020	905		−8.9%
U.S. Decennial Census; 1950 1960 1970 1980; 1990 2000 2010

Empire first appeared as a census designated place the 1990 U.S. census.

Empire CDP, Louisiana – Racial and ethnic composition Note: the U.S. census treats Hispanic/Latino as an ethnic category. This table excludes Latinos from the racial categories and assigns them to a separate category. Hispanics/Latinos may be of any race.
Race / Ethnicity (NH = Non-Hispanic)	Pop 2000	Pop 2010	Pop 2020	% 2000	% 2010	% 2020
White alone (NH)	1,335	650	464	60.38%	65.46%	51.27%
Black or African American alone (NH)	743	212	218	33.60%	21.35%	24.09%
Native American or Alaska Native alone (NH)	9	7	7	0.41%	0.70%	0.77%
Asian alone (NH)	61	75	67	2.76%	7.55%	7.40%
Native Hawaiian or Pacific Islander alone (NH)	0	0	3	0.00%	0.00%	0.33%
Other race alone (NH)	12	11	9	0.54%	1.11%	0.99%
Mixed race or Multiracial (NH)	25	13	46	1.13%	1.31%	5.08%
Hispanic or Latino (any race)	26	25	91	1.18%	2.52%	10.06%
Total	2,211	993	905	100.00%	100.00%	100.00%

In 2000, the CDP's population was 2,211; and by 2010, its population declined to 993. At the 2020 census, its population was 905.

== See also ==
- KWMZ-FM
