= KWMZ-FM =

Empire, Louisiana; United States
- Broadcast area: New Orleans, Louisiana
- Frequency: 104.5 MHz
- Branding: Z-104.5 WMZ FM

Programming
- Format: 1980's hits

Ownership
- Owner: Michael A. Costello; (M.A.C. Broadcasting, LLC)
- Sister stations: WTIX-FM

History
- First air date: June 5, 2001; 24 years ago (as KNOU)
- Former call signs: KBIL (1998–2001, CP); KNOU (2001–2012)

Technical information
- Facility ID: 89100
- Class: C2
- ERP: 13,500 watts
- HAAT: 259 meters (850 feet)
- Transmitter coordinates: 29°33′45″N 89°49′46″W

Links
- Webcast: Listen Live
- Website: Z-104.5

KWMZ-FM (104.5 FM, "Z-104.5, WMZ FM") is a radio station licensed to serve Empire, Louisiana. The station is owned by Michael A. Costello through licensee M.A.C. Broadcasting, LLC.

== History ==
This station received its original construction permit from the Federal Communications Commission on May 15, 1998. The new station, intended for Grand Isle, Louisiana, was assigned the call letters KBIL by the FCC on July 17, 1998.

The station signed on the air as a rhythmic contemporary music formatted station branded as "U104.5" on June 5, 2001, using the call sign KNOU. KNOU had evolved to an urban contemporary/hip hop music format by December 2001.

JP Broadcasting, LLC agreed in July 2002 to sell KNOU to On Top Communications of Louisiana, LLC for a reported $8.5 million. The deal was approved by the FCC on September 6, 2002, and the transfer was completed on December 6, 2002.

On January 6, 2003, the station changed its branding to "Hot 104.5" and brought in Russ Parr's syndicated morning show and veteran programmer Lamonda Williams.

=== Hurricane Katrina and silence ===
In September 2005, in the wake of Hurricane Katrina, KNOU applied to the FCC for permission to temporarily broadcast from another site and tower. They noted in their application that the current city of license and the broadcast tower were "destroyed" and that it would be "many months" before a new tower could be constructed. The FCC twice denied their request to continue operations at the temporary site.

In January 2006, On Top Communications of Louisiana's filed for bankruptcy, and the license was transferred to the debtor in possession handling the bankruptcy proceedings.

On February 6, 2006, the FCC granted KNOU a special temporary authority to broadcast from a facility near Diamond, Louisiana. On March 23, 2006, the station fell silent again.

On Top Communications owner Steve Hegwood would later return to the New Orleans market in 2024 via his current company Core Radio Group, taking over KLRZ under a time brokerage agreement (with an option to purchase) and flipping it to urban contemporary under his Streetz brand.

=== Hurricane Gustav and silence ===
On August 29, 2008, KNOU went off the air due to the approach of Hurricane Gustav. When Gustav made landfall on September 1, 2008, KNOU's temporary site at Buras, Louisiana, was hit with storm surge and rain which damaged the facilities and flooded the studio facilities trailer with roughly five feet of water. The equipment and transmitter were deemed a total loss so on September 24, 2008, KNOU filed for a new "remain silent" authority from the FCC.

=== New ownership ===
On October 6, 2008, the Debtor-In-Possession reached an agreement to transfer the license and equipment leases for KNOU to Power Broadcasting, LLC. According to the Asset Purchase agreement filed with the FCC, Power Broadcasting had a secured loan for $8 million that it presented to the bankruptcy court and was awarded the station's assets, subject to FCC approval. The transfer was completed on December 1, 2008..

==== Returned to the air ====
On June 30, 2011, KNOU returned to the air with a classic rock format.

==== Changed callsign to KWMZ-FM ====
Effective August 15, 2012, KNOU was sold to Michael A. Costello's M.A.C. Broadcasting, LLC for $350,000. Coincident with the consummation of the sale, the station's call sign was changed to the current KWMZ-FM. On September 10, 2012, KWMZ-FM went silent.

==== Returned to the air again ====
On February 5, 2013, KWMZ-FM returned to the air with a 1980s hits format as "Z104.5". The station uses the correct call letters in its legal ID, but otherwise drops the K in its calls, referring to itself as "WMZ-FM".
