= Rodney Bartholomew =

American basketball player

Personal information
- Born: May 21, 1989 (age 37) Port Sulphur, Louisiana
- Listed height: 6 ft 8 in (2.03 m)
- Listed weight: 235 lb (107 kg)

Career information
- High school: South Plaquemines (Port Sulpher, Louisiana)
- College: Corning CC (2008–2010); Indiana Tech (2010–2012)
- NBA draft: 2012: undrafted
- Playing career: 2012–2014
- Position: Forward

Career history
- 2012–2014: Tulsa 66ers

Career highlights
- NBA Development League Performer of the Week (2014); First-team NAIA All-American (2012); WHAC Player of the Year (2012); 2x First-team All-WHAC (2011, 2012); NAIA National Player of the Week (2012); WHAC Newcomer of the Year (2011); WHAC All-Newcomer Team (2011); NJCAA D3 First Team All American (2010); Corning Community College Male Athlete Of The Year (2010); 2x First Team All-MSAC (2009,2010); 2x First Team All Region III (2009,2010); NJCAA D3 All American Honorable Mention (2009)

Rodney Bartholomew (born May 21, 1989) is an American professional basketball player last played for the Tulsa 66ers of the NBA D-League. He played college basketball for the Corning Community College and Indiana Tech.

== College career ==
From 2008 to 2010, Bartholomew played college basketball for Corning Community College, while at CCC, Bartholomew had an impressive career with the 6’8 center averaging 16.3 points and 14.2 rebounds in his junior college career. This double-double presence was quickly noticed in Region III as Bartholomew was selected as a two-time All-Mid State Athletic Conference player and a two-time All-Region player. In 2008–2009, Bartholomew was successful in his sophomore year and named a National Junior College Athletic Association (NJCAA) All-American, the first CCC male basketball player to accomplish this feat since Jermaine Taggart was selected in the 1997–1998 season.

He transferred to Saint Edwards University in Texas for one semester and then moved to Indiana Tech. Bartholomew first drew St. Edward's attention when Andre Cook, former coach at Hudson Valley Community College, landed the head-coaching job for the Hilltoppers in the summer of 2009. As with any new coach, the pressing issue was to secure a solid recruiting class. Cook's first call was to Corning Community College to see what plans Bartholomew had for transferring. “I am thrilled to have Rodney join us at St. Edward’s,” stated Cook. “As a coach on the opposing bench for the last two years, I have always admired the way Rodney has conducted himself on and off the court. It’s going to be great to have him on my side. He is a fine young man that will have the opportunity to make an immediate impact.”

Bartholomew is the first CCC men's basketball player in the past five years to accept a basketball scholarship to a four-year school upon graduation. The last to accomplish this feat were Kirk Stewart (’04) who signed with NYIT and Darnell Scott (’98) who finished his career on scholarship at Kutztown University. Bartholomew will earn his associate degree from Corning Community College in December 2009 and transfer to St Edward's University in January 2010. He will practice with the Hilltoppers as a red-shirted player, joining the basketball squad officially for the 2010–2011 season.

While at Tech, Bartholomew was a Two-Time NAIA All-American, WHAC Player of the Year, Two-time First-Team All-Conference, WHAC Newcomer of the Year, All-Newcomer Team member and multiple time WHAC and NAIA Player of the Week.

== Professional career ==
Bartholomew went undrafted in the 2012 NBA draft. On November 2, 2012, he was selected in the fifth round of the 2012 NBA D-League draft by the Tulsa 66ers. In November 2013, he was re-acquired by the 66ers.

Bartholomew (6–8, 230, Indiana Tech) totaled double-digit points 11 times in his first season, posting an average of 5.4 points, 4.7 rebounds and 15.6 minutes in 47 games (three starts). Bartholomew scored a career-high 21 points on 10-for-10 shooting from the field in Tulsa's regular season finale against Fort Wayne on April 6.

Jan. 20, 2014 - Rodney Bartholomew of the Tulsa 66ers was today named NBA Development League Performer of the Week for games played Monday. Bartholomew, a 6–8, 235-pound forward from Indiana Tech led Tulsa to a 2–0 record last week, including back-to-back road wins over the Bakersfield Jam and Los Angeles D-Fenders. For the week, he averaged an NBA D-League best 32.0 points (on 68-percent shooting from the floor) to go with 16.0 rebounds. On Jan. 18, Bartholomew scored 32 points and grabbed 17 rebounds helping the 66ers to a 114–110 win. The next night, he finished with 32 points and 15 rebounds in a 128–112 win over the D-Fenders. With the two games, Bartholomew became the first player in 66ers history to record 30 or more points and 15 or more rebounds in back-to-back games. The honor is the first for Bartholomew, who is averaging 11.2 points and 7.9 rebounds this season. Other top performers considered include Idaho's Dee Bost, Santa Cruz's Seth Curry, Maine's Frank Gaines, Sioux Fall's Justin Hamilton, Iowa's Othyus Jeffers, Springfield's Justin Johnson, Sioux Fall's DeAndre Liggins, Austin's Flip Murray, Rio Grande Valley's Gary Talton, and Los Angeles' Terrence Williams.

Bartholomew, totaled double-digit points 28 times and 15 double-double in his second season, posting an average of 12.2 points, 8.2 rebounds and 27.4 minutes in 43 games (25 starts). Bartholomew career-high in this season are 32 points and 19 rebounds.

Bartholomew was invited to the New Orleans Pelicans Summer League Mini Camp in June 2014.
