= South Plaquemines High School =

High school in Louisiana, United States

Location
- 34121 Highway 23; Empire (Buras postal address), (Plaquemines Parish), Louisiana 70041; United States
- 29.3664°N 89.5717°W

Information
- Type: Public high school
- School district: Plaquemines Parish School Board
- Principal: Trichina E. Williams
- Staff: 32.03 (FTE)
- Enrollment: 402 (2023-2024)
- Student to teacher ratio: 12.55
- Colors: Blue and silver
- Mascot: Hurricanes

South Plaquemines High School (SPHS) is a grade 7–12 junior and senior high school in Empire, a census-designated place in Plaquemines Parish, Louisiana; the school has a Buras postal address. A part of Plaquemines Parish School Board, it serves Boothville, Buras, Empire, Port Sulphur, and Venice. In 2006 Jeré Longman of The New York Times described South Plaquemines High as "one of Louisiana’s smaller high schools".

== History ==
It was formed after Hurricane Katrina damaged Buras Middle School (6-8), Buras High School (PK-5 and 9-12), Port Sulphur High School (PK-12), and Boothville-Venice High School (PK-12) in 2005. The permanent school building was established on the site of the former Buras Middle School, while faculty residences reside on the property of the former Buras High School. The permanent building had a cost of $27 million.

The school opened in mid-August 2006. Prior to the opening of the permanent building, the school operated out of temporary facilities on the site of the former Port Sulphur High School. The students selected the school mascot, the Hurricanes, since the community had weathered a hurricane; the other choices were the gators and the eagles. As of 2006 the school had 266 students. In October 2006 the cafeteria at the temporary site had not yet opened and the science labs were not yet fully stocked with equipment. The hallways of the temporary school building were named Hurricane Alley, Katrina Way and Rita Way.

In 2009–2010 the school had 348 students, and this increased to 376 by 2010–2011.

== School culture and academic performance ==
As of 2006, many parents of South Plaquemines students only had high school educations, and many students came from low socioeconomic families. South Plaquemines officials stated that teenage pregnancy was an issue at the school.

== Athletics ==
South Plaquemines High athletics competes in the LHSAA.

=== Athletics history ===
Football history
American football has been a popular sport in the south Plaquemines community prior to the establishment of South Plaquemines High. Initially the school American football team used borrowed property 30 miles (48 km) from the temporary school facilities. This is because the athletic field at Port Sulphur High, the temporary South Plaquemines High location, had no scoreboard, no working bleachers, and no working lights. This meant that initially the football team had to make a roundtrip journey of 60 miles (97 km) in order to practice. In late August 2006 the field at Port Sulphur had been re-sodded, but it took weeks for the grass to grow. Further preparations came as new goal posts and scoreboards were installed.

Cyril Crutchfield, who formerly coached the American football team of Port Sulphur High School, served as the football team coach of South Plaquemines after the school first opened; he remained as coach by 2009. In 2006 there was no gymnasium at the school and no band equipment, so unlike most teams, South Plaquemines did not have a band nor a pep rally. The team did not have a weight room nor a locker room. For its first season in 2006 it only had one home game. The players, many of whom had not played for years, came from schools that were previously rival teams and had used different playing styles. In 2007, at the beginning of the season, about one third of the players of the football team were still living in trailers provided by the Federal Emergency Management Agency (FEMA). Longman added that "It is in many ways remarkable that South Plaquemines qualified for the state playoffs in Class 2A" in 2006. The National Football League later gave a $35,000 grant, and Longman stated that it could be used for a weight room.

Jeré Longman of The New York Times wrote that the sport became "a refuge" for the post-Katrina South Plaquemines community. In its first season (2006), South Plaquemines lost to Clinton High School 48-16. In 2007 and 2008 South Plaquemines won Class 1A titles in the State of Louisiana, and in 2009 it was the 1A runner up. Steven Weins served as the coach until 2016. 34-year old Ferrante Dominique, previously of White Castle High School, became the coach of the football team of South Plaquemines High in 2016.

The permanent school added artificial turf to its stadium.

Basketball history
When the school initially opened in 2006, the male and female basketball teams had to practice at a site in Boothville, 23 miles (37 km) away, due to a lack of facilities.

=== Championships ===
Football championships

- (3) State Championships: 2007, 2008, 2024

== Notable people ==
- Rodney Bartholomew, former professional basketball player who played in the NBA G League for the Oklahoma City Blue and Tulsa 66ers from 2012 to 2014. He attended South Plaquemines High School in Port Sulphur, Louisiana, where he was named an All-State wide receiver in 2006.
- Bradley Sylve (Class of 2011), current cornerback of the DC Defenders in the XFL
