= Anthony Johnson (defensive lineman) =

American football player (born 1993)

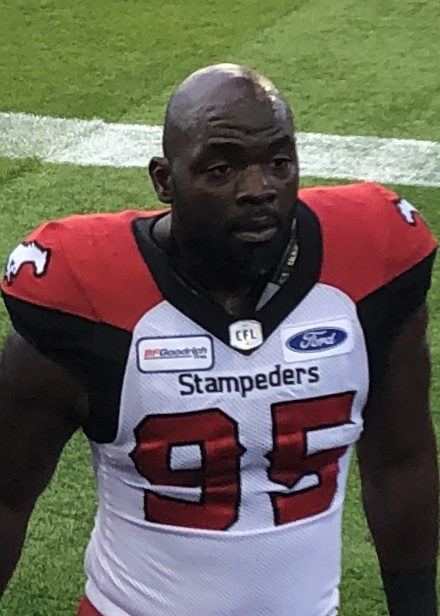
- Johnson with the Calgary Stampeders in 2019

No. 76, 96, 75, 97, 95
- Position: Defensive end

Personal information
- Born: January 24, 1993 (age 33); New Orleans, Louisiana, U.S.
- Listed height: 6 ft 3 in (1.91 m)
- Listed weight: 275 lb (125 kg)

Career information
- High school: O. Perry Walker (New Orleans)
- College: LSU
- NFL draft: 2014: undrafted

Career history
- Miami Dolphins (2014); Washington Redskins (2015–2016)*; New England Patriots (2016); New York Jets (2016–2017); Indianapolis Colts (2017–2018); Memphis Express (2019); Calgary Stampeders (2019); Los Angeles Wildcats (2020); DC Defenders (2020)
- * Offseason or practice squad member only

Awards and highlights
- Second-team All-SEC (2013); Freshman All-American (2011)

Career NFL statistics
- Total tackles: 16
- Fumble recoveries: 1
- Stats at Pro Football Reference

Anthony Johnson (born January 24, 1993) is an American former professional football player who was a defensive end in the National Football League (NFL). He played college football for the LSU Tigers. During his high school football career at O. Perry Walker High School in New Orleans, Johnson broke the Louisiana career sack record with 67.5.

== Early life ==
Born to Nakisha Johnson and Sherman Patty and raised in New Orleans, Johnson's family was displaced by Hurricane Katrina in 2005, and moved to Atlanta, and later Mobile, Alabama, for a period of time.

After returning to New Orleans, Johnson attended O. Perry Walker High School, where he was a four-time all-district selection. He broke the Louisiana career sack record with 67.5 sacks during his four-year career. As a senior in 2010, he recorded 129 tackles, 31 tackles for loss, and 17.5 sacks. The team went 9–4 on the season, advancing to the LHSAA Class 4A semifinals, where they lost 36–6 to Franklinton. Both USA Today and Parade named Johnson to their All-American teams. Gatorade named him the Louisiana State Player of the Year, as the first lineman, and only third defender, in the 16 years of the award.

One of the most sought after high school players in the country, Johnson was rated as a five-star prospect by every recruiting service. Rivals.com ranked him the No. 1 defensive tackle of his class, and compared him to Darnell Dockett. Johnson chose LSU over offers from almost every major school, including Alabama, Oklahoma, and Southern California.

== College career ==
Johnson played in thirteen games for LSU in 2011, and was named to both the CBSSports.com and Sporting News Freshman All-American teams. He was named full-time starter in his junior year for the 2013 football season. Johnson declared for the 2014 NFL draft after his junior season.

== Professional career ==
Pre-draft measurables
Height	Weight	Arm length	Hand span	Wingspan	40-yard dash	10-yard split	20-yard split	20-yard shuttle	Three-cone drill	Vertical jump	Broad jump	Bench press
6 ft 2 1/2 in (1.89 m)	308 lb (140 kg)	33 in (0.84 m)	10 3/8 in (0.26 m)	6 ft 5 7/8 in (1.98 m)	5.24 s	1.82 s	3.05 s	4.83 s	7.93 s	24.5 in (0.62 m)	8 ft 6 in (2.59 m)	20 reps
All values from NFL Combine

=== Miami Dolphins ===
On May 10, 2014, Johnson signed with the Miami Dolphins as an undrafted free agent. On December 13, 2014, he was placed on season ending injured reserve after an ankle injury. Johnson did not make the cut for the Dolphins' 2015 season roster.

=== Washington Redskins ===
The Washington Redskins signed Johnson to their practice squad on November 9, 2015.

He signed a futures contract on January 11, 2016. He was released on May 2.

=== New England Patriots ===
Johnson signed with the New England Patriots on May 9, 2016. He was released by the Patriots on September 26. Johnson was re-signed to the team's practice squad two days later. He was promoted back to the active roster on October 15. On October 24, the Patriots waived Johnson. He was re-signed to the practice squad on October 26.

=== New York Jets ===
On November 9, 2016 Johnson was signed by the New York Jets off the Patriots' practice squad.

On August 27, 2017, Johnson was waived/injured by the Jets and placed on injured reserve. He was released by New York on October 17.

=== Indianapolis Colts ===
On November 7, 2017, Johnson was signed to the Indianapolis Colts' practice squad. He was promoted to the active roster on December 5.

On September 1, 2018, Johnson was placed on injured reserve. He was released by Indianapolis on September 11.

=== Memphis Express ===
In 2019, Johnson joined the Memphis Express of the Alliance of American Football. He was placed on injured reserve on March 13, 2019, and activated from injured reserve on April 1.

=== Calgary Stampeders ===
After the AAF ceased operations in April 2019, Johnson signed with the practice roster for the Calgary Stampeders of the Canadian Football League on August 13, 2019. He was released on November 25.

=== Los Angeles Wildcats ===
In October 2019, Johnson was selected by the Los Angeles Wildcats in the 2020 XFL draft. Johnson was placed on the reserve/left squad list on February 10, 2020. Johnson was reportedly unhappy after the Wildcats fired defensive coordinator Pepper Johnson after their Week 1 loss.

=== DC Defenders ===
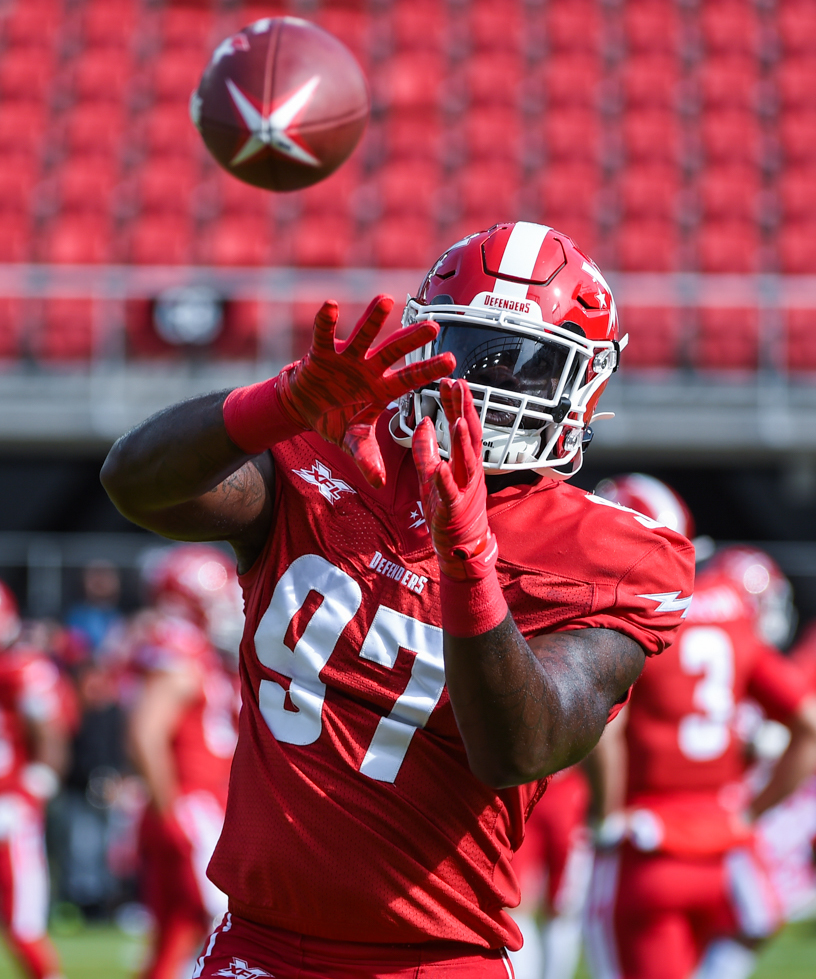
Johnson with the DC Defenders in 2020

On February 14, 2020, Johnson was traded to the DC Defenders in exchange for Bradley Sylve. He had his contract terminated when the league suspended operations on April 10.
