= Port Eads, Louisiana =

Port Eads
- Unincorporated community
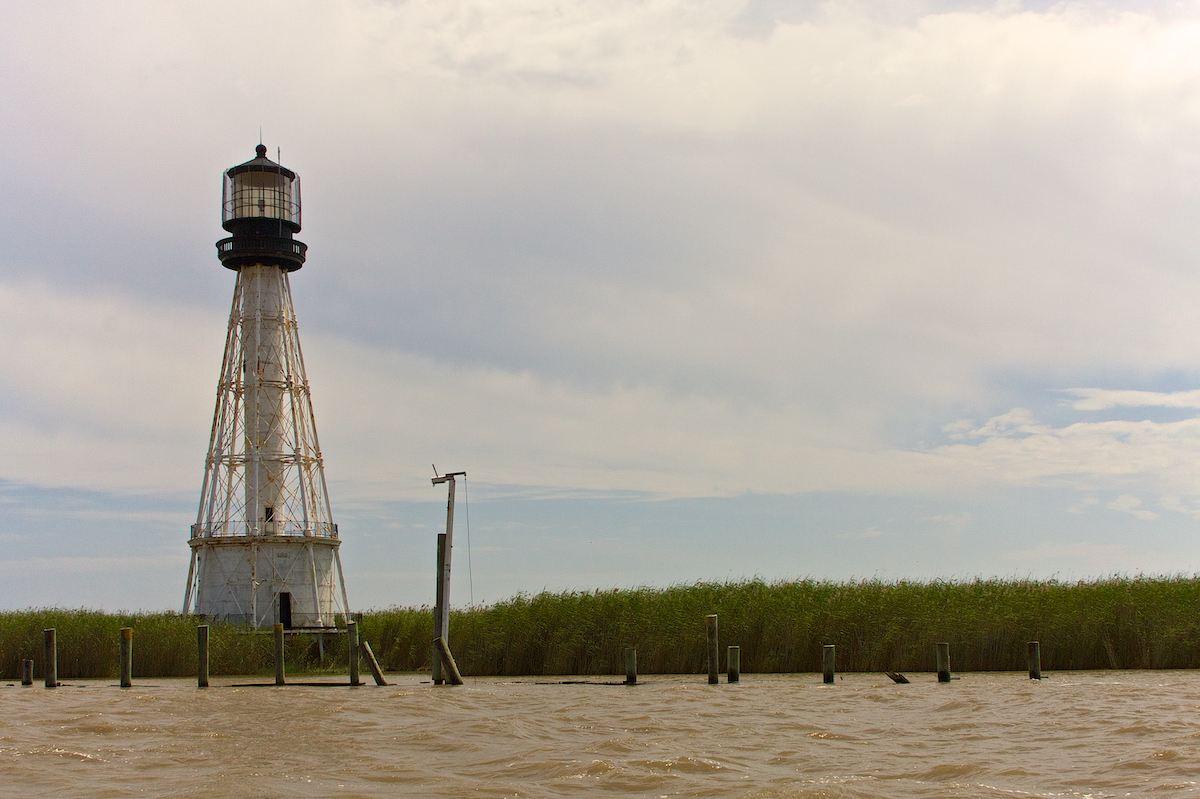
- Lighthouse at Port Eads

- Location of Port Eads in Louisiana
- Coordinates: 29°00′56.153″N 89°10′15.776″W
- Country: United States
- State: Louisiana
- Parish: Plaquemines
- Elevation: 0 ft (0 m)
- Time zone: UTC-6 (CST)
  - Summer (DST): UTC-5 (CDT)
- Postal code: 70091
- Area code: 504

Port Eads is a populated place at the southern tip of the Mississippi River, also known as South Pass, in Plaquemines Parish, Louisiana, United States. It was designated as a National Historic Civil Engineering Landmark by the American Society of Civil Engineers in 1982.

== History ==
=== Eads south pass navigation works ===
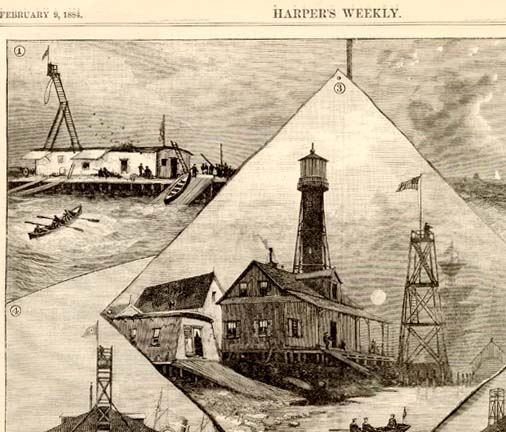
Port Eads drawing from Feb. 9, 1884 Harper's Weekly.

The Mississippi River in the 100-mile-plus stretch between the Port of New Orleans and the Gulf of Mexico frequently suffered from silting up of its outlets, stranding ships, or making parts of the river unnavigable for a period of time. Starting in 1876, James Buchanan Eads (1820–1887) solved the problem with a wooden jetty system that narrowed the main outlet of the river. This caused the river to speed up and cut its channel deeper, so allowing year-round navigation and safe access to the river for large steamers. In the twenty years following the completion of the jetties, trade at New Orleans doubled. Eads was thus honored by having the port at South Pass named after him.

Eads' design for the jetties of the south pass of the Mississippi River was also designated as a National Historic Civil Engineering Landmark by the American Society of Civil Engineers in 1982.

=== Hurricane Katrina ===
The port was completely devastated by Hurricane Katrina. Very little remained except the lighthouse and a few fishing camps that are no longer in service. As of March 2025, the facility remains vacant.

The Federal Emergency Management Agency (FEMA) originally obligated $400,000 to rebuild the Port Eads Marina after Katrina. Parish President Billy Nungesser took office in 2007. He felt the $400,000 was insufficient and he personally traveled to Washington, D.C. and appealed the amount. In early 2009, FEMA authorized up to $12 million for the project.

== Geography ==
At the Head of Passes, the river separates into three main fingers. Port Eads is found at the southern end of the center branch. A lighthouse there serves oceangoing ships. It is accessible only by boat and helicopter.

It is used primarily by offshore fishermen who begin their journey in Venice, Louisiana, 20.3 miles to the north. Port Eads offers docking and refueling premises, bunk rooms with an in room bath for rent, weigh station, and a small restaurant. Because of its location, offshore fishermen from around the country flock to Port Eads. It is the closest port to the continental shelf, the 100-fathom curve, in the entire Gulf of Mexico. The shelf is five miles from the port.

== Tournament ==
Each June, the New Orleans Invitational Billfish Tournament is held there. There have been two one-thousand pound Atlantic blue marlin caught by boats using Port Eads, representing two of three "granders" caught on record in the Gulf of Mexico.
