= Fucich Bayou =

Bay in Plaquemines Parish, United States of America

Coordinates: 29.5019°N 89.6628°W

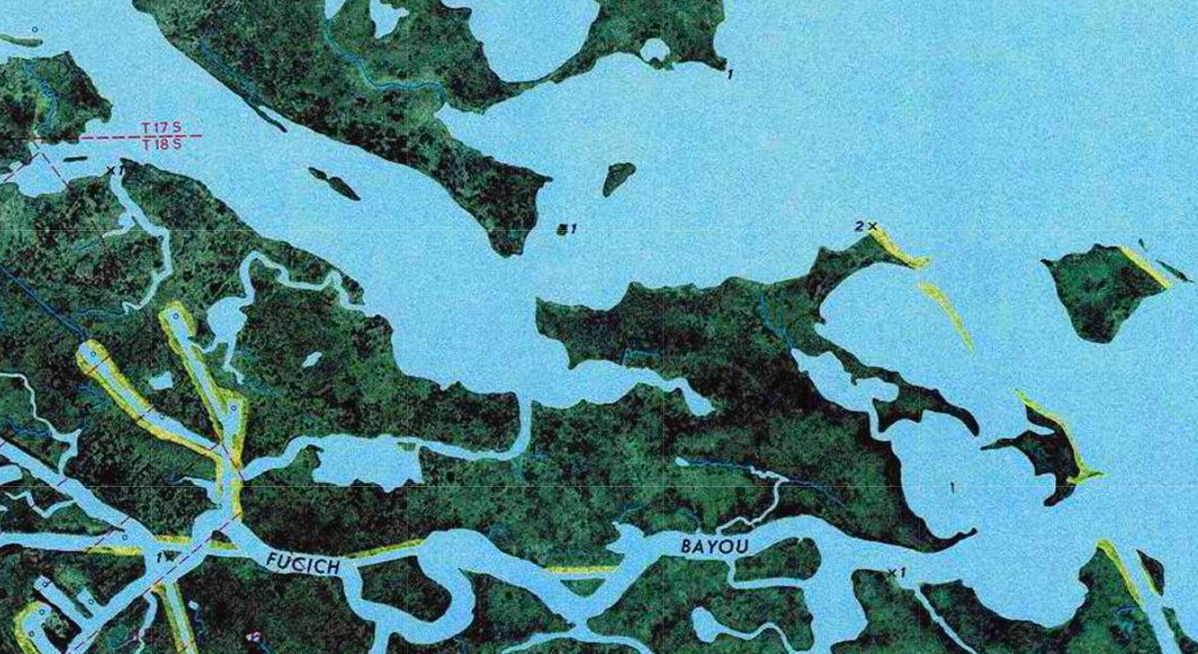
Map of Fucich Bayou

Fucich Bayou is a bayou that spans 3.5 miles and was named after Simeone Fucich. It is located near Pointe A La Hache in Plaquemines Parish, Louisiana, United States.
