= Irene Griffin (activist) =

African-American activist (1927–2012)

Irene W. Griffin (November 10, 1927 - March 27, 2012) was an African-American activist, and the first black woman to register to vote in Plaquemines Parish, Louisiana. She was married to Rev. Percy Murphy Griffin, also a civil rights activist in that community.

== Activism ==
Irene was married to Percy Murphy Griffin, and their initial efforts focused on taking on segregationist Judge Leander Perez after Percy returned from serving in World War II. They started a voter registration campaign for black community residents. In 1954, Irene became the first registered African-American woman to vote in Plaquemines Parish. In 1963, their home was bombed due to their activism.

== Death ==
Irene Griffin died aged 84 in 2012.
