= Venice, Louisiana =

Unincorporated community in Louisiana, United States

- Census-designated place & unincorporated community
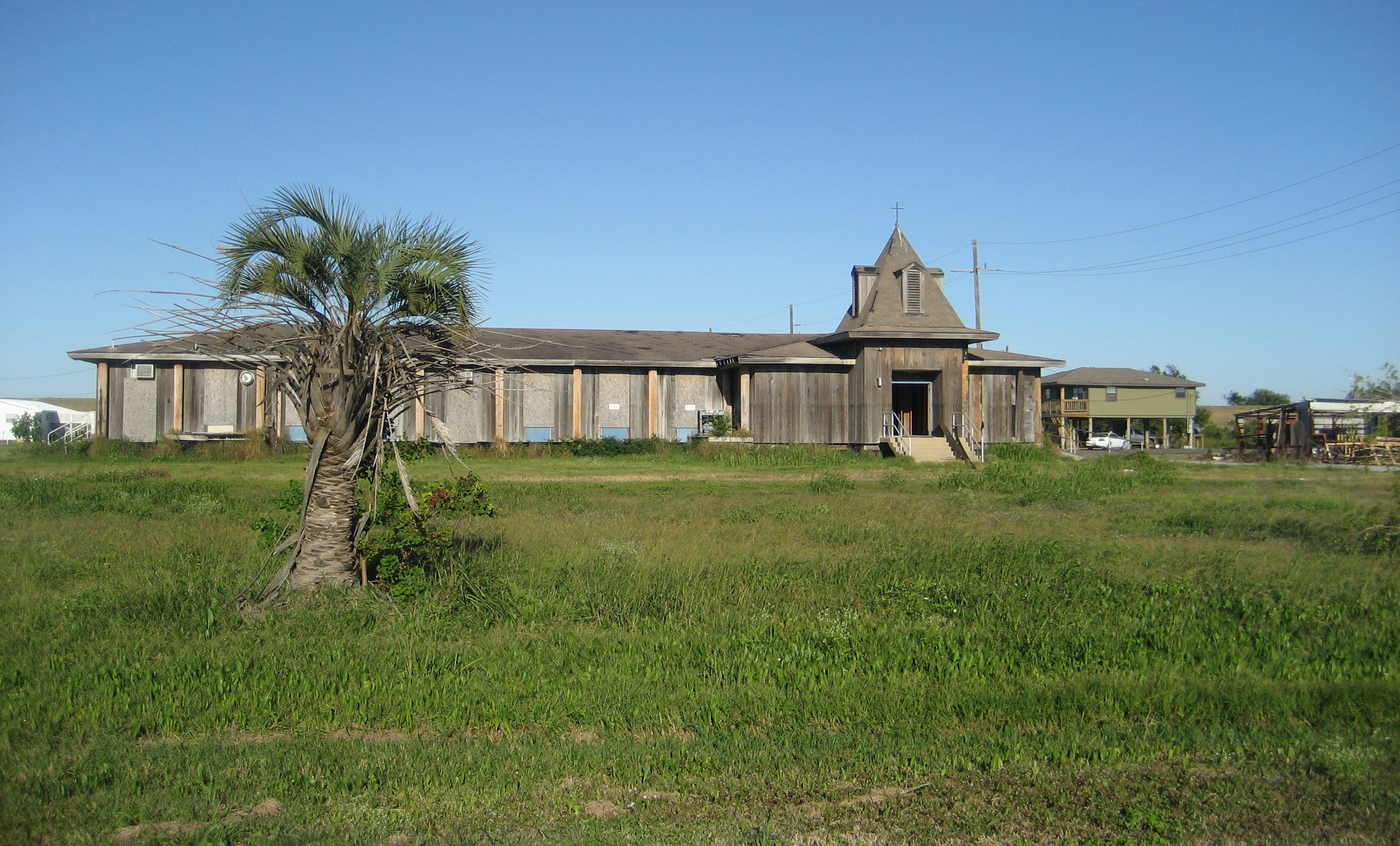
- Venice in 2008

- Location of Venice in Louisiana
- Coordinates: 29°16′37″N 89°21′17″W
- Country: United States
- State: Louisiana
- Parish: Plaquemines

Area
  - Total: 1.63 sq mi (4.22 km^{2})
  - Land: 1.00 sq mi (2.60 km^{2})
  - Water: 0.63 sq mi (1.62 km^{2})
- Elevation: 0 ft (0 m)

Population (2020)
  - Total: 162
  - Density: 160/sq mi (62/km^{2})
- Time zone: UTC-6 (CST)
  - Summer (DST): UTC-5 (CDT)
- ZIP code: 70091
- Area code: 504
- FIPS code: 22-78015

Venice is an unincorporated community and census-designated place in Plaquemines Parish, Louisiana, United States. Located at the southern tip of the Mississippi River Delta, it lies about 77 miles (124 km) south of New Orleans on the west bank of the Mississippi River. As of the 2020 United States census, its population was 162.

Venice is the last community along the Mississippi River accessible by automobile via Louisiana Highway 23, and it serves as the southern terminus of the Great River Road. This location has earned it the nickname "The end of the world."

In 2001, the combined population of Venice and the neighboring communities of Orchard and Boothville was about 2,740 people, with approximately 975 families; about 460 of those residents lived in Venice.

Venice is known for commercial fishing, sport fishing, and offshore oil and gas services, and serves as a departure point for anglers heading to Port Eads near the mouth of the Mississippi River.

== History ==
Before European colonization, the area around present-day Venice was inhabited by indigenous peoples, including the Houma and Chitimacha tribes, who relied on fishing, hunting, and agriculture in the fertile Mississippi River Delta. In April 1682, French explorer Robert de La Salle claimed the Mississippi River and its delta for France, naming the territory Louisiane after Louis XIV. Following the Louisiana Purchase in 1803, the region became part of the United States, and its strategic location at the river's mouth made it important for trade and navigation.

During the 19th century, nearby Fort Jackson and Fort St. Philip played key roles in defending New Orleans and the Mississippi River. Both forts were sites of major battles during the War of 1812 and the American Civil War, including the Capture of New Orleans in 1862.

Venice developed as a fishing and maritime hub in the late 19th and early 20th centuries, earning the nickname "Tuna Town" for its world-class offshore fishing. Its location at the mouth of the Mississippi River also made it a center for shrimping and oyster harvesting. In the 20th century, the discovery of offshore oil and gas reserves brought economic growth and made Venice a key service point for petroleum platforms in the Gulf of Mexico.

Venice has repeatedly suffered catastrophic hurricane damage. Hurricane Betsy (1965) caused widespread flooding and destruction across Plaquemines Parish. In 1969, Hurricane Camille nearly obliterated the community with winds exceeding 190 mph. Hurricane Katrina (2005) devastated Venice with a 25-foot storm surge, sinking boats, destroying homes, and crippling the local fishing industry. Post-Katrina reconstruction included major levee improvements under the Hurricane & Storm Damage Risk Reduction System. More recently, Hurricane Ida (2021) struck Plaquemines Parish as a Category 4 storm, causing severe wind and surge damage.

In April 2010, Venice became a staging ground for cleanup operations during the Deepwater Horizon oil spill, the largest marine oil spill in U.S. history. The disaster released millions of barrels of oil into the Gulf, devastating fisheries and coastal ecosystems.

== Geography ==
Venice is located at the southern tip of Plaquemines Parish on the west bank of the Mississippi River, about 77 miles (124 km) south of New Orleans. It lies within the Mississippi River Delta near the Gulf of Mexico and is the last community accessible by road along Louisiana Highway 23, making it the southern terminus of the Great River Road.

The area covers 1.63 sq mi (4.22 km²), of which 1.00 sq mi (2.60 km²) is land and 0.63 sq mi (1.62 km²) is water. The surrounding landscape consists of marshes and wetlands that support fishing and wildlife.

Venice has a humid subtropical climate with hot summers, mild winters, and frequent thunderstorms. It is highly vulnerable to hurricanes and coastal erosion.

Climate data for Venice, Louisiana
Month	Jan	Feb	Mar	Apr	May	Jun	Jul	Aug	Sep	Oct	Nov	Dec	Year
Mean daily maximum °C	16	18	21	25	28	31	32	32	30	26	21	17	25
Mean daily minimum °C	11	12	15	18	21	24	26	26	24	20	15	12	19
Average precipitation mm	120	110	120	110	130	160	180	180	150	100	110	120	1,590
Mean daily maximum °F	61	64	70	77	82	88	90	90	86	79	70	63	77
Mean daily minimum °F	52	54	59	64	70	75	79	79	75	68	59	54	66
Average precipitation inches	4.7	4.3	4.7	4.3	5.1	6.3	7.1	7.1	5.9	3.9	4.3	4.7	62.4
Source: NOAA

== Demographics ==
Historical population
Census	Pop.	Note	%±
2010	202		—
2020	162		−19.8%
U.S. Decennial Census

Venice first appeared in the 2010 United States census when it was formed along with Boothville CDP from the deleted Boothville-Venice CDP.

Venice CDP, Louisiana – Racial and ethnic composition Note: the US Census treats Hispanic/Latino as an ethnic category. This table excludes Latinos from the racial categories and assigns them to a separate category. Hispanics/Latinos may be of any race.
Race / Ethnicity (NH = Non-Hispanic)	Pop 2010	Pop 2020	% 2010	% 2020
White alone (NH)	170	116	84.16%	71.60%
Black or African American alone (NH)	12	14	5.94%	8.64%
Native American or Alaska Native alone (NH)	4	6	1.98%	3.70%
Asian alone (NH)	2	4	0.99%	2.47%
Native Hawaiian or Pacific Islander alone (NH)	0	0	0.00%	0.00%
Other race alone (NH)	0	1	0.00%	0.62%
Mixed race or Multiracial (NH)	11	14	5.45%	8.64%
Hispanic or Latino (any race)	3	7	1.49%	4.32%
Total	202	162	100.00%	100.00%

The population declined by nearly 20% between 2010 and 2020.

== Industry ==
Venice's economy is strongly tied to its location at the mouth of the Mississippi River, where it serves as a hub for both commercial and recreational activities.

=== Commercial fishing ===
Venice is part of one of the most productive seafood regions in the United States. The Empire–Venice port complex ranks among Louisiana's top commercial fishing ports, landing species such as yellowfin tuna, red snapper, grouper, mahi-mahi, and menhaden. The area also supports major shrimping operations, harvesting brown, white, and pink shrimp, as well as blue crab and oysters. Louisiana's seafood industry contributes over $2.4 billion annually to the state economy, and Venice plays a key role in this supply chain.

Seafood processing and distribution are also significant, with local companies handling shrimp, crab, and finfish for regional and national markets.

=== Sport fishing and tourism ===
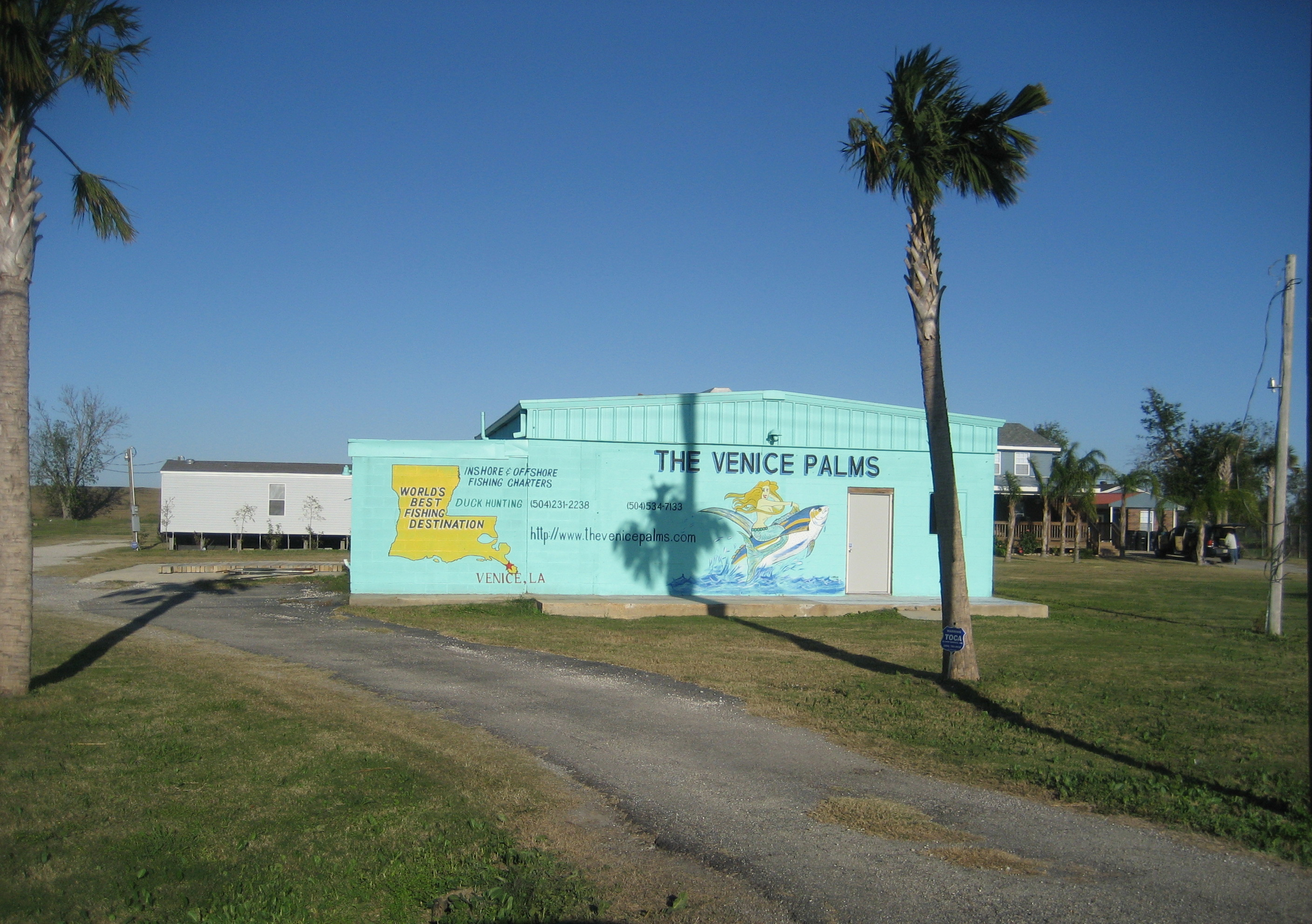
Fishing is a large part of Venice's tourism industry.

Venice is widely known as the "Fishing Capital of the World" and "Tuna Town" due to its proximity to deep-water oil platforms and rich Gulf waters. It is a premier destination for Sport fishing, attracting anglers seeking yellowfin tuna, marlin, redfish, and speckled trout. Charter services and fishing lodges cater to visitors year-round, making tourism a major contributor to the local economy.

=== Oil and gas services ===
Venice is a critical shorebase for the oil and gas industry in the Gulf of Mexico. The Venice Port Complex and associated facilities provide logistics, fueling, and transport for offshore drilling rigs and production platforms. Services include vessel support, equipment rentals, and pipeline operations. Companies such as Chevron, Halliburton, and Tiger Offshore Rentals maintain operations in Venice, which has served the offshore sector for more than 60 years.

Fueling and transport services are provided by companies such as John W. Stone Oil Distributor, which supplies vessels and offshore platforms with diesel, lubricants, and water. The port also supports natural gas infrastructure projects, including the Venice Extension Project, which expands pipeline capacity to Gulf Coast LNG facilities.

== Education ==
Plaquemines Parish School Board operates public schools in the parish.

Venice is served by Boothville-Venice Elementary School in Boothville and South Plaquemines High School in Buras. Boothville-Venice Elementary enrolls approximately 299 students in grades PK–6, offers Gifted & Talented programs, and uses the Project Lead The Way STEM curriculum. The school ranks among the top 30% of Louisiana elementary schools, with reading proficiency around 47% and math proficiency near 40%.

South Plaquemines High School serves grades 7–12 for Venice and surrounding communities. Formed after Hurricane Katrina consolidated several damaged schools, it offers a college preparatory curriculum, dual enrollment, Advanced Placement courses, and career pathways in fields such as digital media, carpentry, and health sciences. The school has about 402 students, a student-teacher ratio of 13:1, and provides athletics through the Louisiana High School Athletic Association.

Plaquemines Parish also offers adult education programs, including HiSET (formerly GED) preparation and workforce training through partnerships with Nunez Community College. Nunez Community College in Chalmette serves Plaquemines Parish and provides associate degrees, technical diplomas, and certifications in fields such as process technology, nursing, welding, and maritime operations.
