= Plaquemines Parish, Louisiana =

Parish in Louisiana, United States

Plaquemines Parish
- Parish
- Parish of Plaquemines; Paroisse de Plaquemine (French); Paroisse des Plaquemines (Cajun French); Parroquia de Plaquemines (Spanish)
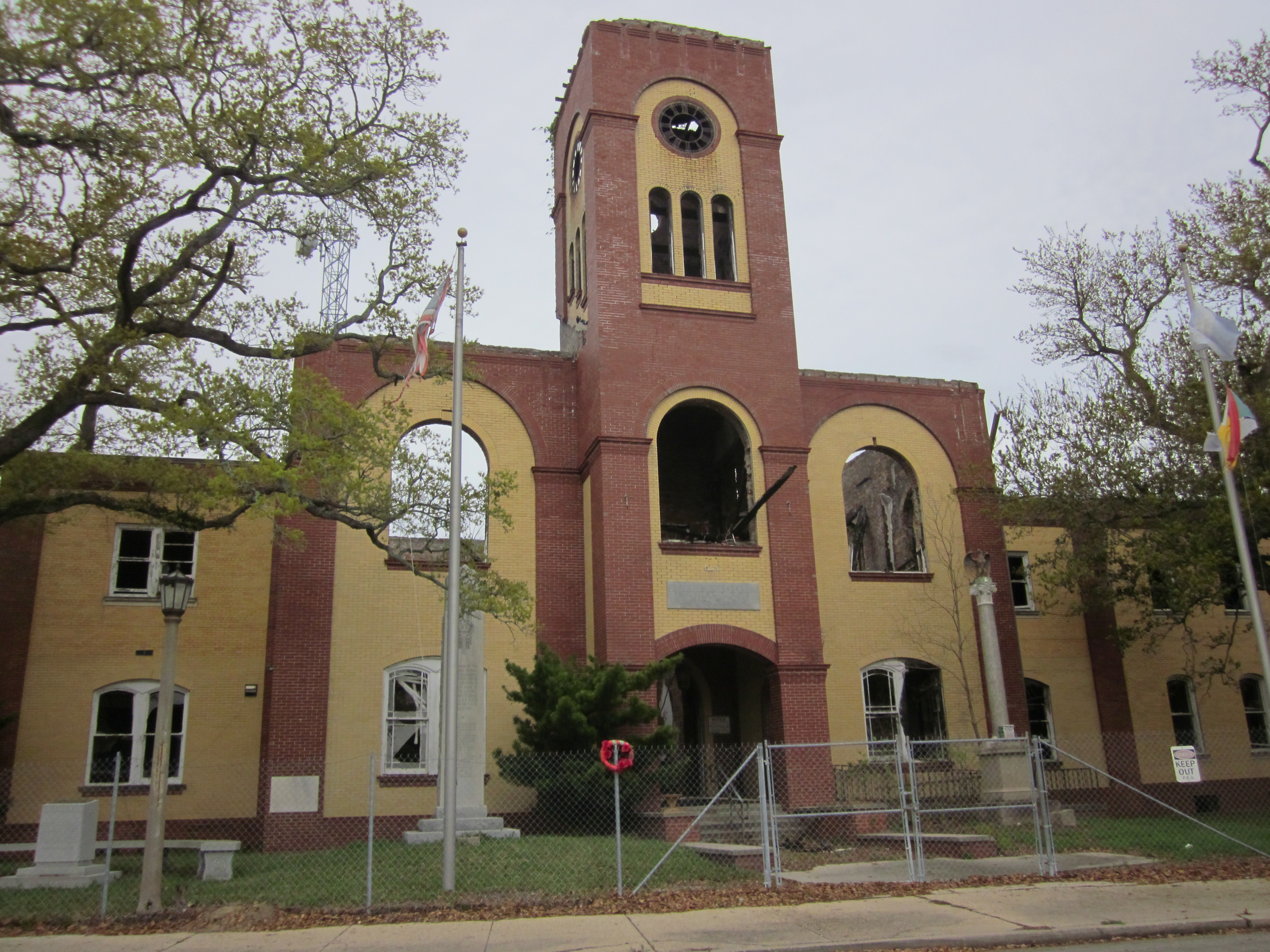
- Plaquemines Parish Courthouse

- Flag Seal

- Location within the U.S. state of Louisiana
- Coordinates: 29°23′N 89°29′W
- Country: United States
- State: Louisiana
- Founded: 1807
- Named for: Louisiana French word for persimmons
- Seat: Pointe à la Hache
- Largest community: Belle Chasse

Area
  - Total: 2,567 sq mi (6,650 km^{2})
  - Land: 780 sq mi (2,000 km^{2})
  - Water: 1,787 sq mi (4,630 km^{2}) 70%

Population (2020)
  - Total: 23,515
  - Estimate (2025): 22,256 ▼
  - Density: 30.15/sq mi (11.64/km^{2})
- Time zone: UTC−6 (Central)
  - Summer (DST): UTC−5 (CDT)
- Congressional district: 1st
- Website: www.plaqueminesparish.gov

Plaquemines Parish (/ˈplækɪmɪnz/ PLAK-im-inz; French: Paroisse de Plaquemine; Louisiana French: Paroisse des Plaquemines; Spanish: Parroquia de Plaquemines) is a parish located in the U.S. state of Louisiana. With a population of 23,515 at the 2020 census, the county has no incorporated communities. Both the parish seat, Pointe à la Hache and the largest community, Belle Chasse are among the numerous census-designated places scattered throughout the low-lying county. The parish was formed in 1807.

Plaquemines Parish is part of the New Orleans–Metairie metropolitan statistical area. It was severely damaged in the aftermath of Hurricane Katrina on August 29, 2005, and in hurricane events in 2011 and 2021.

== History ==
The name "Plaquemines," in Kouri-Vini, was derived from the Atakapa word piakimin, meaning the local fruit persimmon. The French used it to name a military post they built on the banks of the Mississippi River, as the site was surrounded by numerous persimmon trees. Eventually the name was applied to the entire parish and to a nearby bayou.

The oldest European settlement in the parish was La Balize, where the French built and inhabited a crude fort by 1699 near the mouth of the Mississippi River. The name in French meant "seamark", a tall structure of wood built as a guide for ships. By 1721 the French built one 62 feet (19 m) high. A surviving map from about 1720 shows the island and fort, and the mouth of the river.

As traffic and trade on the river increased, so did the importance of river pilots who were knowledgeable about the complicated, ever-changing currents and sandbars in the river. They lived at La Balize with their families. The village was destroyed and rebuilt numerous times, but it was abandoned for good after being destroyed by a September 1860 hurricane. The pilots moved upriver and built the settlement they named Pilottown, which reached its peak of population in the 19th century. The river pilots' expertise continues to be critical, but now they generally live with their families in more populated areas. They stay at Pilottown temporarily for work.

An important historical site is Fort Jackson, built in 1822 as recommended by General Andrew Jackson, hero of the Battle of New Orleans in the War of 1812. In 1861, Fort Jackson served as an important Confederate defense for the city of New Orleans during the Civil War because it was at the mouth of the Mississippi River. The US Army used it as a training base during World War I, 1917–1918.

Plaquemines is one of only two parishes that have kept their same boundaries from the beginning of Louisiana's parishes in 1807 to today, the other being St. Bernard Parish.

In 1863 Abraham Lincoln mentioned Plaquemines Parish in the Emancipation Proclamation as a confederate parish.

=== 20th century to present ===
Because Plaquemines Parish encompasses the last 70 miles (110 km) of the Mississippi River before it reaches the Gulf of Mexico, it is the site of several oil refineries, which rely on the shipping lanes for moving their product. The Mississippi River Delta of Plaquemines is also a base for assistance to offshore oil rigs. Plaquemines Parish was the first place in the United States where shippers used a container for cargo in foreign trade. The area is also known for having the southernmost point in Louisiana, at just under 29 degrees north.

In the early 1900s, Plaquemines was an exporter of citrus. Farmers used the railroads and the Mississippi to ship the large annual harvest to markets. Commercial fisheries, especially for oysters, have been important in the parish economy.

From 1924 to 1969, Plaquemines and St. Bernard parishes were effectively the domain of the Democratic political boss Leander Perez, who established a strong hold over the area. He was notorious for fixing elections and enforcing strict racial segregation. Upon his death, his sons Leander Perez Jr., and Chalin O. Perez were elected as the dominant political figures of the parish as district attorney and parish president, respectively. Interpersonal feuding weakened the family's hold on power. After another decade, by 1980 political opponents had begun to win local elections.

The Civil Rights struggle for African-Americans to become registered voters in Plaquemines Parish began in October 1946, under the guidance of Dr. Rev. Percy Murphy Griffin. With the aid of Attorneys Earl Amedee and Louis Berry from New Orleans, Griffin and twenty-six African-Americans from Plaquemines Parish organized the Plaquemines Parish Civil and Political Organization, Inc., to fight racial barriers established by Perez. In the summer of 1953, the group organized a voter registration drive for African Americans. In 1954, Irene Griffin became the first black woman to register to vote in the parish. The organization filed class-action suits against Leander Perez and in 1953, several African-Americans became registered voters in Plaquemines Parish. In 1966, the organization led the fight to integrate public schools. The movement also worked to get Seymourville and another small community included within the parish boundaries; the city had sought to exclude these majority-black communities to prevent black votes from being counted. The Civil Rights Act of 1964 ended legal segregation, and the Voting Rights Act of 1965 authorized federal oversight and enforcement of voter registration and elections in jurisdictions with historic under-representation of minority elements of the population. After 1965, African Americans in Louisiana began full participation in Louisiana politics.

==== Hurricanes and flooding ====
Plaquemines Parish has repeatedly been hit by flooding. The August 1901 Hurricane caused damage, including 4 feet of water in Buras. The Great Hurricane of 1915 devastated much of the parish, with multiple levee breaches on both sides of the Mississippi, a 12-foot storm surge, and hundreds of deaths. Homelessness was widespread, and many people were reduced to starvation until charitable aid arrived. The old Parish Courthouse in Pointe à la Hache was among the many buildings destroyed in the storm, but a new one was completed within the year.

During the Great Mississippi Flood of 1927, city and state leaders used dynamite to breach a levee at Caernarvon, thirteen miles (21 km) below Canal Street, in order to save the city of New Orleans from flooding. This action resulted in the flooding of much of the less populated St. Bernard and Plaquemines parishes, causing widespread destruction to agriculture and housing.

In 1965, Hurricane Betsy flooded many buildings, including the parish courthouse, and caused nine deaths. Leander Perez sealed off the parish to control the distribution of state assistance. Again in 1969, Hurricane Camille devastated portions of Plaquemines Parish. Storm surge over 10 feet, winds over 100 miles per hour, and peak pressure at 941 hPa devastated Buras, Louisiana, Venice, Louisiana, and many more towns and cities.

Hurricane Katrina struck Louisiana on August 29, 2005, resulting in one of the worst disasters in United States history; it severely damaged all of southeast Louisiana. Martial law was not declared in Plaquemines, contrary to many media reports, as no such term exists in Louisiana state law. Plaquemines was the place where the hurricane made landfall at 6.10 a.m. No place escaped without some damage, while most of Plaquemines, Orleans, and neighboring St. Bernard parishes was severely affected. The towns of Pointe à la Hache, Port Sulphur, Buras, Triumph, Empire, Boothville, Phoenix, and Venice suffered catastrophic damage. Amid heavy rains accompanied by hurricane-force winds in excess of 120 mph (190 km/h) at initial landfall (with a Category 5 storm surge), the levees failed and broke. The storm surge which flowed in was more than 20 feet (6.1 m) high. Although a majority of the populace had complied with mandatory state evacuation orders, some did not, possibly because they were not able to. At least three people died.

It is estimated that without significant human intervention, Plaquemines Parish will lose 55% of its current land to rising sea levels over the next 50 years.

== Geography ==
According to the U.S. Census Bureau, the parish has a total area of 2,567 square miles (6,650 km^{2}), of which 780 square miles (2,000 km^{2}) is land and 1,787 square miles (4,630 km^{2}) (70%) is water. It is the largest parish by total area in Louisiana. Plaquemines Parish is bordered to the south and southeast by the Gulf of Mexico.

=== Major highways ===
- Louisiana Highway 23
- Louisiana Highway 39
- Louisiana Highway 300
- Louisiana Highway 406
- Louisiana Highway 1261
- Louisiana Highway 3017
- Louisiana Highway 3137

=== Adjacent parishes and features ===
- Orleans Parish (north)
- St. Bernard Parish (northeast)
- Jefferson Parish (west)

=== National protected areas ===
- Breton National Wildlife Refuge (part)
- Delta National Wildlife Refuge

=== Historic sites ===
The parish includes three United States National Historic Landmarks:

- Fort De La Boulaye Site,
- Fort Jackson, and
- Fort St. Philip.

The parish has five other sites listed on the National Register of Historic Places, including Woodland Plantation, which has been depicted on the label of Southern Comfort liqueur since the 1930s. Woodland Plantation is an antebellum mansion located in West Pointe à la Hache, on the west bank of the Mississippi River. It is now operated as a bed and breakfast.

=== Communities ===
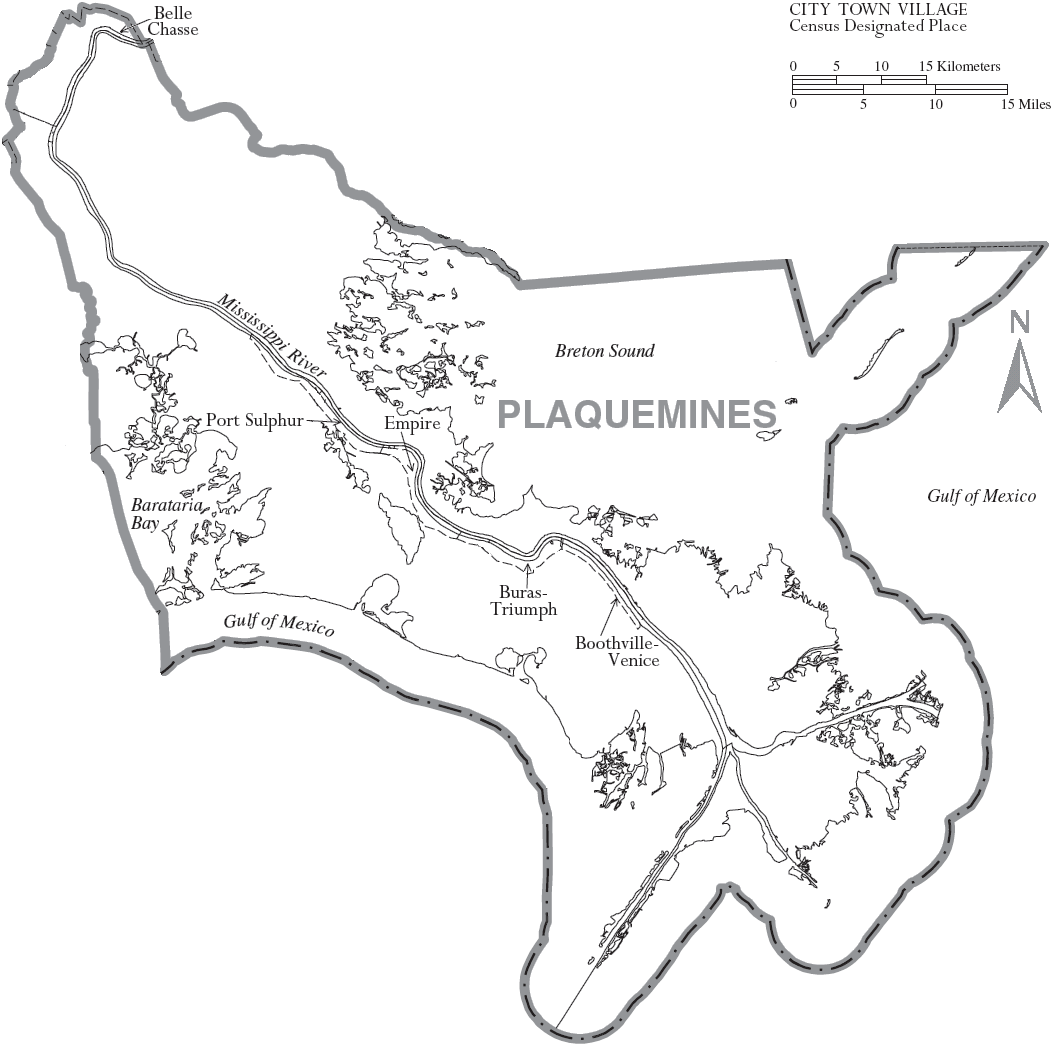
Map of Plaquemines Parish with municipal labels

There are no incorporated areas within Plaquemines Parish. Communities not listed below include Happy Jack, Myrtle Grove, Nairn, Naomi, Oakville, and Scarsdale.

==== Census-designated places ====
- Belle Chasse
- Boothville
- Buras
- Empire
- New Orleans Station
- Pointe à la Hache (parish seat)
- Port Sulphur
- Triumph
- Venice

==== Unincorporated communities ====
- Bohemia
- Braithwaite
- Carlisle
- Dalcour
- Davant
- Duvic
- Grand Ecaille
- Ironton
- Jesuit Bend
- Orchid
- Phoenix
- Pilottown
- Port Eads
- West Pointe à la Hache

==== Outdated designations ====
- Boothville-Venice
- Buras-Triumph

==== Ghost towns ====
- Burrwood
- La Balize

=== Climate ===
The parish has a humid subtropical climate (Cfa) with mild winters, long, hot and humid summers, plentiful rain year-round, and all months averaging significantly above 50″F (10 °C). Six months average above 22 °C (71.6 °F.) The hardiness zone is 10a.

== Demographics ==
Historical population
Census	Pop.	Note	%±
1820	2,354		—
1830	4,489		90.7%
1840	5,060		12.7%
1850	7,390		46.0%
1860	8,494		14.9%
1870	10,552		24.2%
1880	11,575		9.7%
1890	12,541		8.3%
1900	13,039		4.0%
1910	12,524		−3.9%
1920	10,194		−18.6%
1930	9,608		−5.7%
1940	12,318		28.2%
1950	14,239		15.6%
1960	22,545		58.3%
1970	25,225		11.9%
1980	26,049		3.3%
1990	25,575		−1.8%
2000	26,757		4.6%
2010	23,042		−13.9%
2020	23,515		2.1%
2025 (est.)	22,256	▼	−5.4%
U.S. Decennial Census; 1790–1960 1900–1990; 1990–2000 2010–2013

Plaquemines Parish, Louisiana – Racial and ethnic composition Note: the US Census treats Hispanic/Latino as an ethnic category. This table excludes Latinos from the racial categories and assigns them to a separate category. Hispanics/Latinos may be of any race.
Race / Ethnicity (NH = Non-Hispanic)	Pop 1980	Pop 1990	Pop 2000	Pop 2010	Pop 2020	% 1980	% 1990	% 2000	% 2010	% 2020
White alone (NH)	19,369	18,091	18,412	15,617	13,764	74.36%	70.74%	68.81%	67.78%	58.53%
Black or African American alone (NH)	5,453	5,898	6,227	4,675	4,863	20.93%	23.06%	23.27%	20.29%	20.68%
Native American or Alaska Native alone (NH)	283	460	549	340	255	1.09%	1.80%	2.05%	1.48%	1.08%
Asian alone (NH)	108	492	696	726	1,042	0.41%	1.92%	2.60%	3.15%	4.43%
Native Hawaiian or Pacific Islander alone (NH)	x	x	3	19	40	x	x	0.01%	0.08%	0.17%
Other race alone (NH)	121	44	91	96	191	0.46%	0.17%	0.34%	0.42%	0.81%
Mixed race or Multiracial (NH)	x	x	346	502	1,124	x	x	1.29%	2.18%	4.78%
Hispanic or Latino (any race)	715	590	433	1,067	2,236	2.74%	2.31%	1.62%	4.63%	9.51%
Total	26,049	25,575	26,757	23,042	23,515	100.00%	100.00%	100.00%	100.00%	100.00%

=== 2020 census ===
As of the 2020 census, the county had a population of 23,515. The median age was 36.8 years, with 26.3% of residents under the age of 18 and 13.5% aged 65 or older. For every 100 females there were 104.6 males, and for every 100 females age 18 and over there were 102.3 males age 18 and over.

The racial makeup of the county was 60.8% White, 20.9% Black or African American, 1.2% American Indian and Alaska Native, 4.5% Asian, 0.2% Native Hawaiian and Pacific Islander, 4.0% from some other race, and 8.4% from two or more races. Hispanic or Latino residents of any race comprised 9.5% of the population.

Reflecting nationwide demographic trends of non-Hispanic white decline, the 2020 census determined 58.53% of the population was non-Hispanic white, 20.68% Black or African American, 1.08% Native American, 4.40% Asian, 0.17% Pacific Islander, 5.59% two or more races, and 9.51% Hispanic and Latino American of any race.

66.8% of residents lived in urban areas, while 33.2% lived in rural areas.

There were 8,190 households in the county, of which 40.8% had children under the age of 18 living in them. Of all households, 51.1% were married-couple households, 18.5% were households with a male householder and no spouse or partner present, and 23.8% were households with a female householder and no spouse or partner present. About 21.9% of all households were made up of individuals and 9.0% had someone living alone who was 65 years of age or older.

There were 9,447 housing units, of which 13.3% were vacant. Among occupied housing units, 70.8% were owner-occupied and 29.2% were renter-occupied. The homeowner vacancy rate was 1.0% and the rental vacancy rate was 10.2%.

The 2019 American Community Survey estimated 23,338 people resided in the parish. At the 2019 census estimates, the racial and ethnic makeup of the parish was 67.9% non-Hispanic white, 20.3% Black and African American, 1.1% American Indian and Alaska Native, 3.9% Asian, 1.8% some other race, and 5.0% from two or more races; an estimated 7.3% of the population were Hispanic and Latino American of any race. In 2019, 10.4% of the population spoke another language other than English at home, and there were 8,919 households living in 10,174 housing units.

=== 2010 census ===
The 2010 census recorded 23,042 residents, down from the 26,757 people counted in 2000.

=== 2000 census ===
At the 2000 U.S. census, there were 26,757 people, 9,021 households, and 7,000 families residing in the parish. The racial makeup of the parish was 69.77% White, 23.39% Black or African American, 2.07% Native American, 2.62% Asian, 0.01% Pacific Islander, 0.73% from other races, and 1.42% from two or more races; 1.62% of the population were Hispanic or Latino American of any race. Of the population in 2000, 2.22% reported speaking French or Creole French at home.

In 2000, were 9,021 households, out of which 39.50% had children under the age of 18 living with them, 57.50% were married couples living together, 14.60% had a female householder with no husband present, and 22.40% were non-families. 18.60% of all households were made up of individuals, and 7.10% had someone living alone who was 65 years of age or older. The average household size was 2.89 and the average family size was 3.30.

The median income for a household in the parish was $38,173, and the median income for a family was $42,610 in 2000. Males had a median income of $37,245 versus $21,691 for females. The per capita income for the parish was $15,937. About 15.40% of families and 18.00% of the population were below the poverty line, including 20.70% of those under age 18 and 18.40% of those age 65 or over.

In 2019, the median household income increased to $57,204. Males had a median income of $49,251 versus $36,404 for females; 18.2% of the parish population lived at or below the poverty line.

Religiously, Christianity has been the area's predominant religion. According to the Association of Religion Data Archives in 2020, the Roman Catholic Church was the parish's largest single Christian denomination with 14,845 members spread throughout 5 parish churches. Non-denominational and interdenominational congregationalist, Bible, and United and Uniting churches were the second-largest Christian group in the parish with 1,190 members. The non/inter-denominational churches reflected the increase among ecumenical and independent churches throughout Louisiana since the 2020 religion census by the Association of Religion Data Archives.

== Economy ==
Plaquemines has a significant seafood industry. The parish exports millions of pounds of shrimp, crab, oysters, and fish annually. Plaquemines also has a vibrant citrus and horticulture nursery stock industry, but saltwater intrusion is becoming a hurdle to these producers. The seafood and citrus industries have suffered somewhat in the wake of Hurricane Katrina in August 2005. About half the shrimping and shellfish fleet were lost. In January 2007, thousands of citrus trees went unpicked.

As of 2012, Plaquemines parish is the largest crude-oil producing parish in Louisiana. It produced over 14 million barrels in 2012.

Plaquemines Port is one of the largest ports in the United States, handling mostly domestic traffic. The Plaquemines Port, Harbor & Terminal District is coextensive with the parish. It was created in 1954 by the legislature of Louisiana as a state agency. It is governed by a committee of the Plaquemines Parish Council, acting as the Port Board.

=== Alternative energy ===
Oil and gas continue to play a dominant role in the Plaquemines economy; however, there is a growing policy and resource trend in favor of renewable resources. The Parish government is working with public and private partners to invest in renewable energy, including hydrokinetic energy and wind energy. Plaquemines has a huge potential for hydrokinetic energy sites along deep bends in the Mississippi River. The flow of the river is 470,000 cubic feet per second at the Head of Passes during normal river stages and 1,250,000 during peak times. Tidal turbines would be placed in deep bends of the river below seagoing and barge traffic. The turbines would also be located below the usual migrating routes of fish. Four companies intending to install turbines are in the regulatory and permitting stages.

The potential installation of wind turbines at the mouth of the Mississippi River is also being considered. The capacity of a wind source to produce energy is generally measured by Wind Power Density. Wind Power Densities are divided into seven Wind Power Classes. According to the American Wind Energy Association, Plaquemines has winds in specified areas that fall into a Wind Power Class of seven, which makes the Parish a particularly attractive location for wind turbine investment. Wind turbines would likely be placed at the mouth of the Mississippi, where winds are the strongest. Wind Energy Systems Technology has proposed to build a 12.5 MV wind farm in Barataria Bay off the coast of Plaquemines Parish. The energy would be sent to Myrtle Grove through an underground cable. The wind farm would be supplemented with natural gas turbines when wind speeds are either not sufficient or too robust to supply power. A similar proposal is being considered for the southern portion of the Parish.

== Education ==
Plaquemines Parish School Board operates the public schools of the parish. Its boundaries parallel those of the parish.

The parish is in the service area of Nunez Community College.

== Politics and government ==
Plaquemines Parish was for a long time controlled by the notorious Democrat political boss Leander Perez, who turned the parish's voters away from the national Democratic Party with his support of the Dixiecrat ticket in 1948. The parish has been solidly anti-Democratic and at times overwhelmingly so at a Presidential level since 1948, with the only Democratic nominee subsequently to carry the parish being Bill Clinton in 1996. In 1952 it was the most Republican county-equivalent in the nation, and until the decay of the Perez machine no Democrat was to pass thirty percent of the parish's vote.

Plaquemines Parish is the home of former Parish President and current Lieutenant Governor of Louisiana Billy Nungesser.

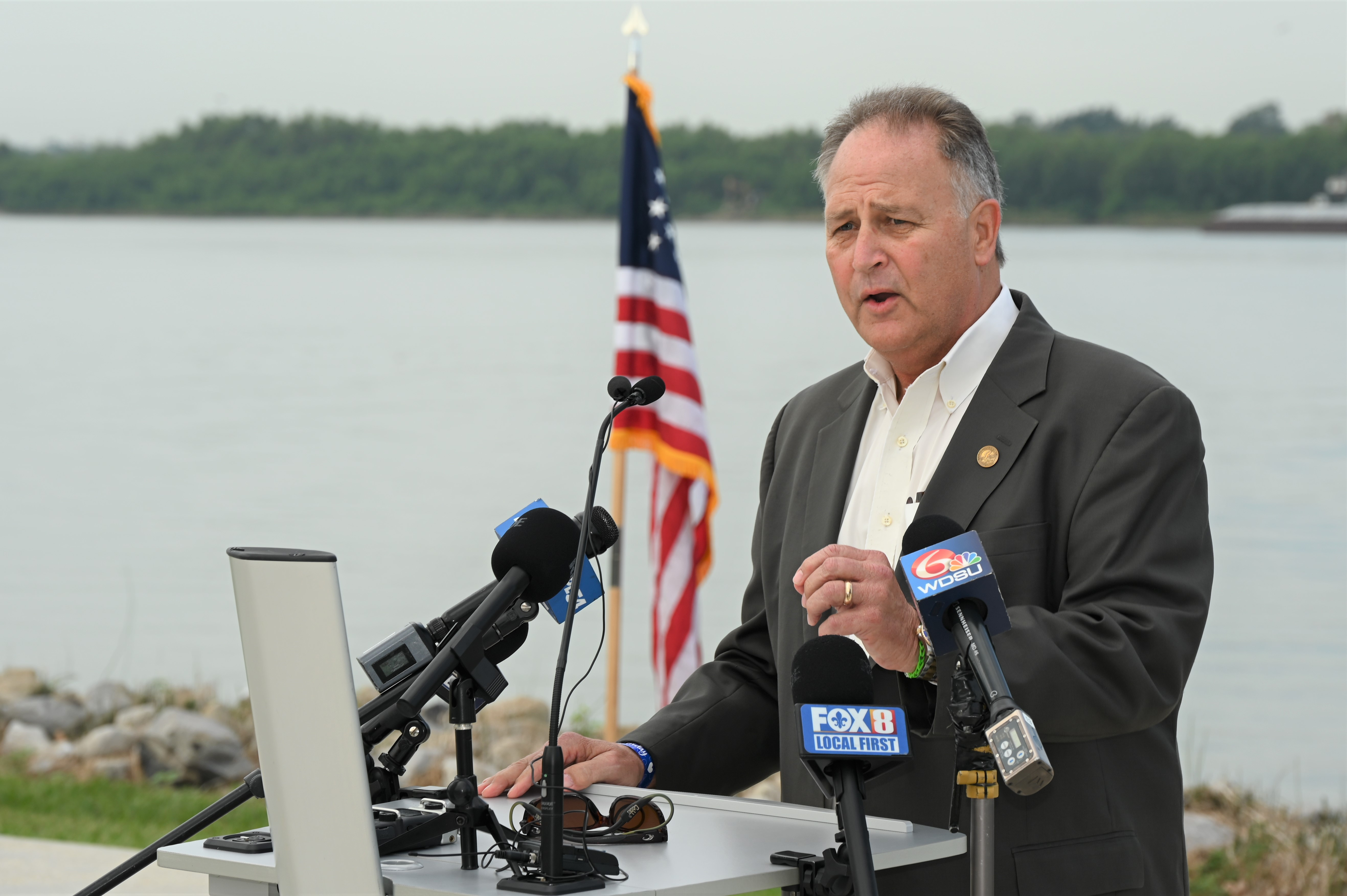
Plaquemines Parish President Keith Hinkley in September 2023

Former Parish President, Republican Amos Cormier III, who additionally secured the endorsement of the parish Libertarians, defeated his Republican rival Kirk Lepine in the 2016 special election runoff by a margin of some 20 percent. On December 8, 2018, however, Lepine in a runoff rematch unseated Cormier, 3,625 votes (52 percent) to 3,289 (48 percent).

Keith Hinkley was elected Parish President in 2022.

The Louisiana SPCA is contracted to run the parish animal shelter.

United States presidential election results for Plaquemines Parish, Louisiana
Year	Republican		Democratic		Third party(ies)	
Year	No.	%	No.	%	No.	%
1912	41	9.40%	361	82.80%	34	7.80%
1916	43	8.41%	461	90.22%	7	1.37%
1920	124	26.44%	329	70.15%	16	3.41%
1924	119	20.84%	432	75.66%	20	3.50%
1928	98	8.49%	1,056	91.51%	0	0.00%
1932	38	1.94%	1,918	98.06%	0	0.00%
1936	94	4.08%	2,209	95.92%	0	0.00%
1940	204	9.34%	1,979	90.66%	0	0.00%
1944	335	16.03%	1,755	83.97%	0	0.00%
1948	90	3.24%	77	2.78%	2,607	93.98%
1952	3,370	92.97%	255	7.03%	0	0.00%
1956	2,998	81.20%	534	14.46%	160	4.33%
1960	712	13.84%	1,087	21.12%	3,347	65.04%
1964	4,904	86.35%	775	13.65%	0	0.00%
1968	968	11.33%	1,144	13.39%	6,430	75.28%
1972	6,595	83.05%	990	12.47%	356	4.48%
1976	6,052	68.35%	2,614	29.52%	189	2.13%
1980	5,489	54.46%	4,318	42.84%	272	2.70%
1984	7,655	69.74%	3,261	29.71%	61	0.56%
1988	6,084	59.11%	3,997	38.83%	212	2.06%
1992	5,018	44.58%	4,467	39.68%	1,772	15.74%
1996	4,493	41.61%	5,348	49.53%	956	8.85%
2000	6,302	57.65%	4,425	40.48%	204	1.87%
2004	7,866	64.72%	4,181	34.40%	106	0.87%
2008	6,894	65.98%	3,380	32.35%	175	1.67%
2012	6,471	63.20%	3,599	35.15%	169	1.65%
2016	6,900	65.26%	3,347	31.66%	326	3.08%
2020	7,412	67.30%	3,414	31.00%	188	1.71%
2024	6,803	68.41%	3,023	30.40%	119	1.20%

== Notable people ==
- Dan Alexander
- Irene Griffin
- Billy Nungesser
- Leander Perez
- Chris Henry

== See also ==
- Barataria Bay
- Louisiana Highway 23, on the west bank
- Louisiana Highway 39, on the east bank
- National Register of Historic Places listings in Plaquemines Parish, Louisiana
