= Buras, Louisiana =

- Census-designated place
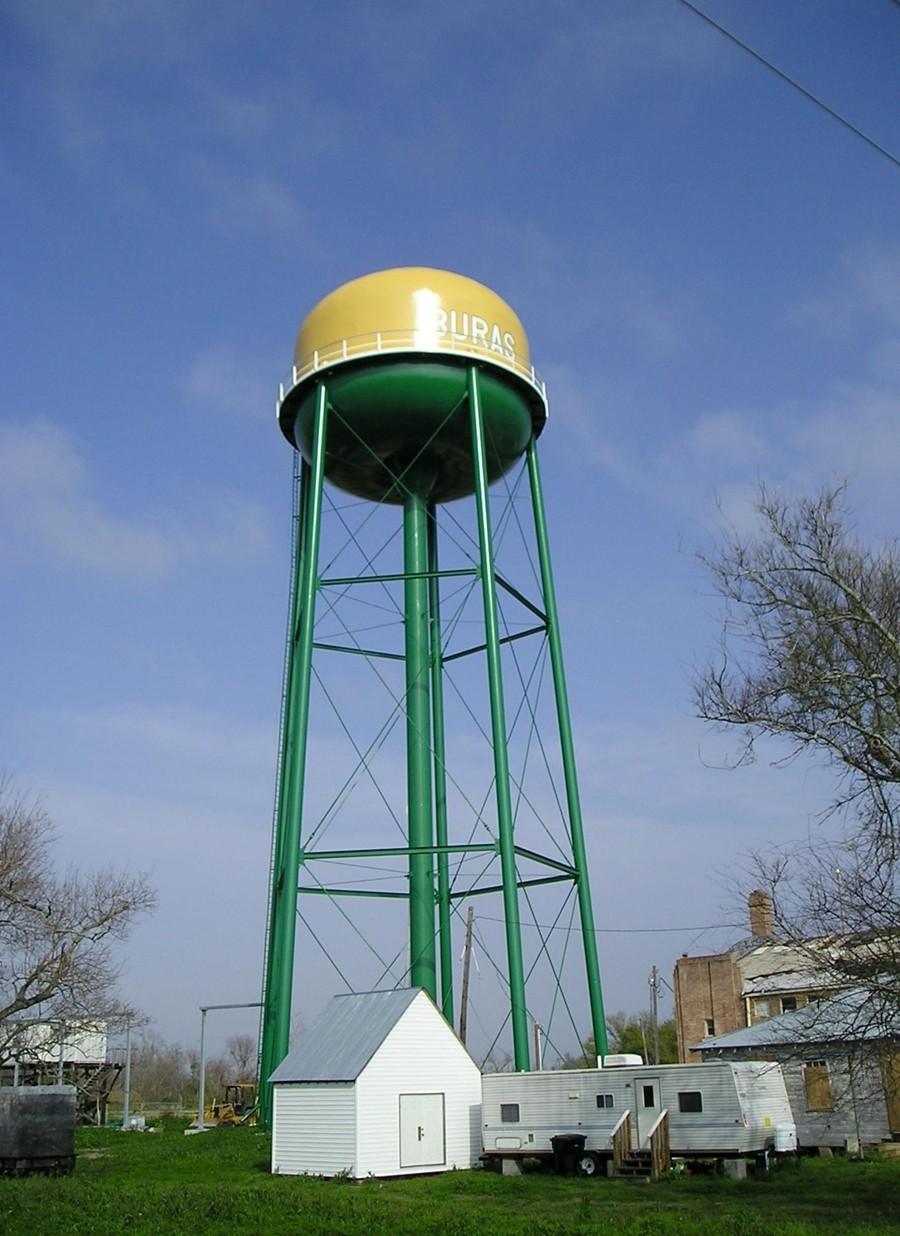
- New water tower in Buras

- Location within Louisiana
- Coordinates: 29°21′07″N 89°31′27″W
- Country: United States
- State: Louisiana
- Parish: Plaquemines

Area
  - Total: 3.35 sq mi (8.67 km^{2})
  - Land: 2.30 sq mi (5.95 km^{2})
  - Water: 1.05 sq mi (2.72 km^{2})
- Elevation: 0 ft (0 m)

Population (2020)
  - Total: 1,109
  - Density: 482.6/sq mi (186.35/km^{2})
- Time zone: UTC-6 (Central (CST))
  - Summer (DST): UTC-5 (CDT)
- ZIP code: 70041
- Area code: 504
- GNIS feature ID: 558181

Buras (/ˈbjʊrəs/ BYOOR-əs) is a census-designated place (CDP) in Plaquemines Parish, Louisiana, United States. Its population was 945 at the 2010 census, and 1,109 in 2020. Prior to the 2010 census, Buras was considered to be part of the Buras-Triumph CDP.

== History ==
Hurricane Katrina made its official landfall in Louisiana in Buras in Plaquemines Parish, Louisiana on August 29, 2005. Buras experienced the full force of the storm, with catastrophic winds and storm surge leading to extensive damage. This area marked the first point of impact for one of the most devastating hurricanes in U.S. history.

In November 2006, Jeré Longman of The New York Times wrote that "almost no evidence of recovery exist[ed]" in the post-Hurricane Katrina period. In December 2007, Longman reported that there was still "little sign of recovery" in Buras. The town was founded in the 1840s; 20 years later, it was the site of Civil War battles at Forts Jackson and St. Philip. Today, the Buras area is known for hauling in much of the state's oysters.

== Geography ==
=== Climate ===
Climate data for Buras, Louisiana (1991–2020)
Month	Jan	Feb	Mar	Apr	May	Jun	Jul	Aug	Sep	Oct	Nov	Dec	Year
Mean daily maximum °F (°C)	62.0 (16.7)	66.1 (18.9)	70.9 (21.6)	77.0 (25.0)	82.6 (28.1)	87.3 (30.7)	89.7 (32.1)	89.5 (31.9)	86.2 (30.1)	80.0 (26.7)	71.6 (22.0)	65.4 (18.6)	77.4 (25.2)
Daily mean °F (°C)	54.3 (12.4)	58.4 (14.7)	63.2 (17.3)	69.5 (20.8)	75.9 (24.4)	81.1 (27.3)	83.2 (28.4)	82.9 (28.3)	80.0 (26.7)	72.7 (22.6)	64.2 (17.9)	57.6 (14.2)	70.3 (21.2)
Mean daily minimum °F (°C)	46.6 (8.1)	50.8 (10.4)	55.5 (13.1)	61.9 (16.6)	69.3 (20.7)	75.0 (23.9)	76.7 (24.8)	76.2 (24.6)	73.9 (23.3)	65.4 (18.6)	56.8 (13.8)	49.8 (9.9)	63.2 (17.3)
Average precipitation inches (mm)	5.42 (138)	4.22 (107)	4.78 (121)	4.50 (114)	3.82 (97)	7.19 (183)	7.22 (183)	7.19 (183)	6.62 (168)	4.40 (112)	3.60 (91)	3.87 (98)	62.83 (1,595)
Average snowfall inches (cm)	0.0 (0.0)	0.0 (0.0)	0.0 (0.0)	0.0 (0.0)	0.0 (0.0)	0.0 (0.0)	0.0 (0.0)	0.0 (0.0)	0.0 (0.0)	0.0 (0.0)	0.0 (0.0)	0.0 (0.0)	0 (0)
Source: NOAA

== Demographics ==
Historical population
Census	Pop.	Note	%±
2010	945		—
2020	1,109		17.4%
U.S. Decennial Census

Buras first appeared in the 2010 U.S. census formed along with the Triumph CDP from the deleted Buras-Triumph CDP.

Buras CDP, Louisiana – Racial and ethnic composition Note: the US Census treats Hispanic/Latino as an ethnic category. This table excludes Latinos from the racial categories and assigns them to a separate category. Hispanics/Latinos may be of any race.
Race / Ethnicity (NH = Non-Hispanic)	Pop 2010	Pop 2020	% 2010	% 2020
White alone (NH)	564	471	59.68%	42.47%
Black or African American alone (NH)	63	118	6.67%	10.64%
Native American or Alaska Native alone (NH)	19	16	2.01%	1.44%
Asian alone (NH)	210	344	22.22%	31.02%
Native Hawaiian or Pacific Islander alone (NH)	0	0	0.00%	0.00%
Other race alone (NH)	5	18	0.53%	1.62%
Mixed race or Multiracial (NH)	53	82	5.61%	7.39%
Hispanic or Latino (any race)	31	60	3.28%	5.41%
Total	945	1,109	100.00%	100.00%

Buras was split off from the Buras-Triumph CDP prior to the 2010 U.S. census. In the pre-Katrina period (before August 29, 2005) Buras had about 30-40 Cambodian shrimpers, presenting the area's large Asian American population. In the post-Hurricane period (after August 29, 2005) Brenda Kap, quoted in The New York Times, stated most of them had returned. At the 2020 United States census, its Asian population was 344, making them the second-largest racial and ethnic group in the CDP; non-Hispanic and Latino whites made up 471 persons total, and Black and African Americans were the third largest group.

== Government ==
The United States Postal Service operates a post office.

== Education ==
Plaquemines Parish School Board operates the public schools of the parish.

It is served by South Plaquemines High School in Empire, next to the Buras CDP, and with a Buras postal address.

Prior to 2005, Buras Middle School (grades 6–8) and Buras High School (grades PK-5 and 9–12) served the community, but Hurricane Katrina damaged the buildings. In the immediate post-Katrina period no new campuses opened in Buras, leading some residents to feel that the community may further erode. The permanent school building of South Plaquemines High was established on the site of the former Buras Middle School, while faculty residences were placed on the property of the former Buras High School.

Plaquemines Parish is in the service area of Nunez Community College.

The Plaquemines Parish Library maintains the Buras Branch.
