= Plaquemines Parish School Board =

School district in Louisiana, United States

Plaquemines Parish School Board (PPSB) is a school district headquartered in unincorporated Plaquemines Parish, Louisiana, United States.

The district includes the entire parish.

The current superintendent is Denis Rousselle.

== History ==
The school district refused to follow the Civil Rights Act of 1964, and refused to desegregate its schools until 1967.

== School uniforms ==
All Plaquemines Parish public schools require school uniforms.

== Schools ==
All schools are located in unincorporated areas.

=== K-12 schools ===
- Phoenix High School

=== High schools ===
- 7-12
  - South Plaquemines High School
- 9-12
  - Belle Chasse High School

=== 4-8 schools ===
- Belle Chasse Middle School

=== PK-6 schools ===
- Boothville-Venice Elementary School
- South Plaquemines Elementary School

=== PK-4 schools ===
- Belle Chasse Primary School

== Former schools ==
The following consolidated into South Plaquemines High School after Hurricane Katrina and Hurricane Rita:

- Port Sulphur High School - PK-12
- Buras Middle School (6-8)
- Buras High School (PreK-5 and 9–12)
- Boothville-Venice High School (PreK-12)
