= National Register of Historic Places listings in Plaquemines Parish, Louisiana =

Location of Plaquemines Parish in Louisiana

This is a list of the National Register of Historic Places listings in Plaquemines Parish, Louisiana.

This is intended to be a complete list of the properties on the National Register of Historic Places in Plaquemines Parish, Louisiana, United States. The locations of National Register properties for which the latitude and longitude coordinates are included below, may be seen in a map.

There are 16 properties listed on the National Register in the parish.

This National Park Service list is complete through NPS recent listings posted December 12, 2025.

== Current listings ==
	Name on the Register	Image	Date listed	Location	City or town	Description
1	Fort De La Boulaye Site		October 15, 1966 (#66000378)	Eastern bank of the Mississippi River, along Louisiana Highway 39; 29°38′57″N 89°56′40″W	Phoenix	Fort De La Boulaye was a fort built in 1699–1700, when France took control of the mouth of the Mississippi River. Located less than one mile northeast of highway 39 on the Joe Gravolet canal. Historic marker recently returned on site reads: "FORT de la BOULAYE First white settlement in present day Louisiana, erected on this spot (then the bank of the Mississippi), prevented Britain's seizure of the Mississippi Valley." https://npgallery.nps.gov/pdfhost/docs/NHLS/Photos/66000378.pdf
2	Fort Jackson	Fort Jackson	October 15, 1966 (#66000379)	2.5 miles southeast of Triumph on Louisiana Highway 23 on the western bank of the Mississippi River; 29°21′22″N 89°27′18″W	Triumph	Fort Jackson was constructed between 1822 and 1832. In April 1862, it was the site of the Battle of Forts Jackson and St. Philip, the decisive battle for control of New Orleans during the American Civil War. A state-operated park, the fort was flooded in 2005 for several weeks following Hurricanes Katrina and Rita.
3	Fort St. Philip	Fort St. Philip	October 15, 1966 (#66000380)	2.5 miles southeast of Triumph on Louisiana Highway 23 on the eastern bank of the Mississippi River; 29°21′45″N 89°27′58″W	Triumph	Originally established in the 18th-century colonial period, Fort St. Philip's two important engagements were ten-day naval sieges during the War of 1812 and the American Civil War, the former an 1815 American victory against the British Royal Navy and the latter an 1862 Union Navy victory over Confederate forces guarding New Orleans. The site is privately owned and has deteriorated greatly because of river flooding, erosion, and tropical storms.
4	Harlem Plantation House	Harlem Plantation House	October 26, 1982 (#82000451)	West of Pointe à la Hache on Louisiana Highway 39; 29°37′28″N 89°54′10″W	Pointe à la Hache	
5	George Lincoln House		May 31, 2016 (#16000301)	30763 Parish Hwy. 11; 29°26′40″N 89°37′00″W	Nairn	
6	Mary Plantation House	Mary Plantation House	July 13, 1983 (#83000533)	Louisiana Highway 39; 29°48′15″N 89°59′59″W	Braithwaite	Plantation house dating to Spanish Colonial era
7	Promised Land	Promised Land	September 11, 1997 (#97001128)	5907 Louisiana Highway 39; 29°47′43″N 90°00′15″W	Braithwaite	Mansion of Plaquemines Parish boss Leander Perez
8	S.S. Gulfoil (shipwreck and remains)	S.S. Gulfoil (shipwreck and remains)	June 13, 2018 (#100002556)	Address Restricted	Pilottown	
9	S.S. Gulfpenn (shipwreck and remains)		June 13, 2018 (#100002557)	Address Restricted	Pilottown	
10	S.S. Robert E. Lee and U-166 (shipwrecks and remains)	S.S. Robert E. Lee and U-166 (shipwrecks and remains)	December 7, 2018 (#100002558)	Address Restricted	Pilottown	Includes the U-166 submarine remains.
11	S.S. Virginia (shipwreck and remains)		June 13, 2018 (#100002559)	Address Restricted	Pilottown	
12	S.S. Alcoa Puritan (shipwreck and remains)		June 13, 2018 (#100002560)	Address Restricted	Pilottown	
13	Steam Yacht Anona (Shipwreck)		October 15, 2018 (#100003067)	Address Restricted	Pilottown	
14	St. Patrick's Catholic Church	St. Patrick's Catholic Church	December 17, 1999 (#99001571)	21997 Louisiana Highway 23; 29°27′09″N 89°37′34″W	West Pointe à la Hache	Wood frame church built in 1918 to replace former church destroyed in 1915 hurricane. Originally in Homeplace, Louisiana; in 1998 moved to Woodland Plantation; renamed "Spirits Hall".
15	St. Thomas the Apostle Catholic Church and Cemetery	St. Thomas the Apostle Catholic Church and Cemetery	June 22, 2018 (#100002585)	17605 Louisiana Highway 15; 29°35′07″N 89°48′24″W	Pointe à la Hache	
16	Woodland Plantation	Woodland Plantation	June 18, 1998 (#98000702)	21997 Louisiana Highway 23; 29°35′08″N 89°49′34″W	West Pointe à la Hache	

== See also ==
- List of National Historic Landmarks in Louisiana
- National Register of Historic Places listings in Louisiana
