= List of crossings of the Lower Mississippi River =

This is a list of bridges and other crossings of the Lower Mississippi River from the Ohio River downstream to the Gulf of Mexico. Locations are listed with the left bank (moving downriver) listed first.

== Crossings ==
†	Demolished
*	Proposed

Crossing	Carries	West bank	East bank	Year opened	Coordinates
Kentucky – Missouri
Dorena–Hickman Ferry	Automobiles & Passengers	Hickman	Dorena		36°34′04″N 89°12′43″W
Tennessee – Missouri
Caruthersville Bridge	I-155 / US 412	Dyersburg	Caruthersville	1976	36°06′54″N 89°36′47″W
Tennessee – Arkansas
Hernando de Soto Bridge	I-40	Memphis	West Memphis	1973	35°09′10″N 90°03′50″W
Harahan Bridge	Union Pacific Railroad, Big River Crossing Bike/Pedestrian Trail	Memphis	West Memphis	1916	35°07′45″N 90°04′33″W
Frisco Bridge	BNSF Railway	Memphis	West Memphis	1892	35°07′43″N 90°04′35″W
Memphis & Arkansas Bridge	I-55, Mississippi River Trail, US 61 / US 64 / US 70 / US 79	Memphis	West Memphis	1949	35°07′42″N 90°04′36″W
Mississippi – Arkansas
Helena Bridge	US 49	Lula	Helena–West Helena	1961	34°29′48″N 90°35′17″W
Charles W. Dean Bridge *	Future I-69 / US 278	Benoit	Arkansas City	Proposed	33°37′12″N 91°08′10″W
Benjamin G. Humphreys Bridge †		Greenville	Lake Village	1940, demolished 2012	33°17′37″N 91°09′34″W
Greenville Bridge	US 82 / US 278	Greenville	Lake Village	2010	33°17′14″N 91°09′15″W
Mississippi – Louisiana
Old Vicksburg Bridge	Canadian Pacific Kansas City	Vicksburg	Delta	1930	32°18′52″N 90°54′17″W
Vicksburg Bridge	I-20 / US 80	Vicksburg	Delta	1973	32°18′55″N 90°54′30″W
Natchez–Vidalia Bridge	US 84 / US 425	Natchez	Vidalia	1940	31°33′33″N 91°25′09″W
Louisiana
John James Audubon Bridge	LA 10	St. Francisville	New Roads	2011	30°43′39″N 91°21′18″W
Huey P. Long Bridge	US 190; Canadian Pacific Kansas City	Port Allen	Baton Rouge	1940	30°30′25″N 91°11′51″W
Horace Wilkinson Bridge	I-10	Port Allen	Baton Rouge	1968	30°26′23″N 91°11′47″W
Plaquemine Ferry	LA 75 (Automobiles & Passengers)	Sunshine	Plaquemine		30°17′03″N 91°13′04″W
Sunshine Bridge	LA 70	Donaldsonville	Sorrento	1964	30°05′53″N 90°54′44″W
Gramercy Bridge (Veterans Memorial Bridge)	LA 3213	Wallace	Gramercy	1995	30°02′45″N 90°40′21″W
Hale Boggs Memorial Bridge (Luling–Destrehan Bridge)	I-310	Destrehan	Luling	1983	29°56′33″N 90°22′25″W
Huey P. Long Bridge	US 90; New Orleans Public Belt Railroad	Harahan	Bridge City	1935	29°56′39″N 90°10′07″W
Crescent City Connection	US 90 Bus.	Algiers, New Orleans	New Orleans Central Business District	1958	29°56′17″N 90°03′27″W
Algiers Point–Canal Street Ferry	Passengers only	Algiers, New Orleans	New Orleans Central Business District	1827	29°57′05″N 90°03′33″W
Chalmette–Lower Algiers Ferry	Automobiles & Passengers	Algiers, New Orleans	Chalmette	1969	
Belle Chasse–Scarsdale Ferry	Automobiles & Passengers	Belle Chasse	Scarsdale		
Pointe à la Hache Ferry	Automobiles & Passengers	West Pointe à la Hache	Pointe à la Hache		

== See also ==
- List of crossings of the Upper Mississippi River
- List of crossings of the Ohio River
- List of crossings of the Arkansas River
- List of crossings of the Missouri River
- Lists of river crossings in the United States
