= Promised Land (Braithwaite, Louisiana) =

Historic house in Louisiana, United States

- U.S. National Register of Historic Places
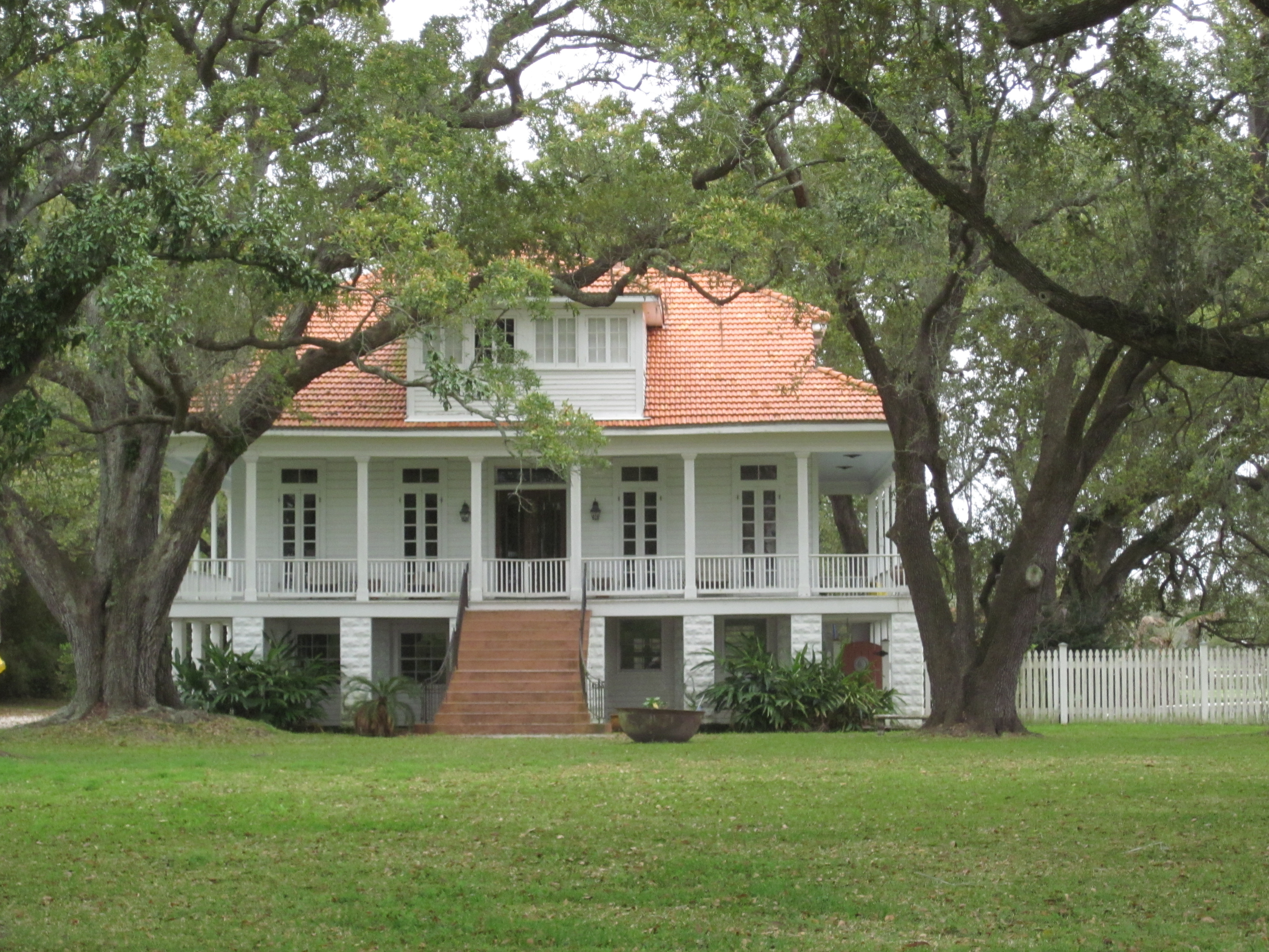

- Location within Louisiana
- Nearest city: Braithwaite, Louisiana
- Coordinates: 29°47′43″N 90°0′15″W
- Area: 3.7 acres (1.5 ha)
- Built: 1925
- Architectural style: Italianate, Bungalow/craftsman
- NRHP reference No.: 97001128
- Added to NRHP: September 11, 1997

Promised Land is a historic mansion located in Braithwaite, Louisiana, USA. It was built in the early 20th century. In 1925, political boss Leander Perez acquired the property and lived there until the early 1960s. It has been listed on the National Register of Historic Places since September 11, 1997.
