= Phoenix High School (Louisiana) =

High school in Louisiana, United States

Location
- 12700 Highway 23; Braithwaite, (Plaquemines Parish), Louisiana 70040; United States
- Coordinates: 29.6442°N 89.9290°W

Information
- Type: Public high school
- School district: Plaquemines Parish School Board
- Principal: Kristie Williams
- Staff: 17.00 (FTE)
- Enrollment: 200 (2021–22)
- Student to teacher ratio: 11.76
- Colors: Blue and gold
- Mascot: Spartan
- Nickname: Spartans

Phoenix High School is a K–12 school in Braithwaite, a community in unincorporated Plaquemines Parish, Louisiana, United States. It serves Braithwaite, Bohemia, and Phoenix, and is a part of the Plaquemines Parish School Board.

== History ==
In 2009–2010 the school had 193 students, and this increased to 209 by 2010–2011.

The school's current campus opened in 2012.

== Athletics ==
Phoenix High athletics competes in the LHSAA.
