= Slammer =

Slammer may refer to:

- Slammer, an alternative name for the exclamation mark.
- SQL Slammer, a computer worm
- AIM-120 AMRAAM, an American missile, nicknamed Slammer
- Sholef / Slammer, an Israeli self-propelled howitzer gun
- The Slammer, a children's talent show on British television
- Slammer Guitars, a budget subsidiary of Hamer Guitars
- Penn Jillette's house in Las Vegas, known as "the slammer"
- Slammer (ride), at Thorpe Park theme park, England
- Slammer, an entity who changes a telephone carrier of a telephone line illegally (Telephone slamming)
- British Slam-door trains, also known as slammers
- Slammers, a mercenary unit in the science fiction Hammerverse
- A type of POG, a children's game
- "The slammer", a colloquial term for prison

== See also ==
- Alabama Slammer, a cocktail
- Tequila Slammer, a cocktail
