= Woodland Plantation (West Pointe a la Hache, Louisiana) =

Historic house in Louisiana, United States

- U.S. National Register of Historic Places
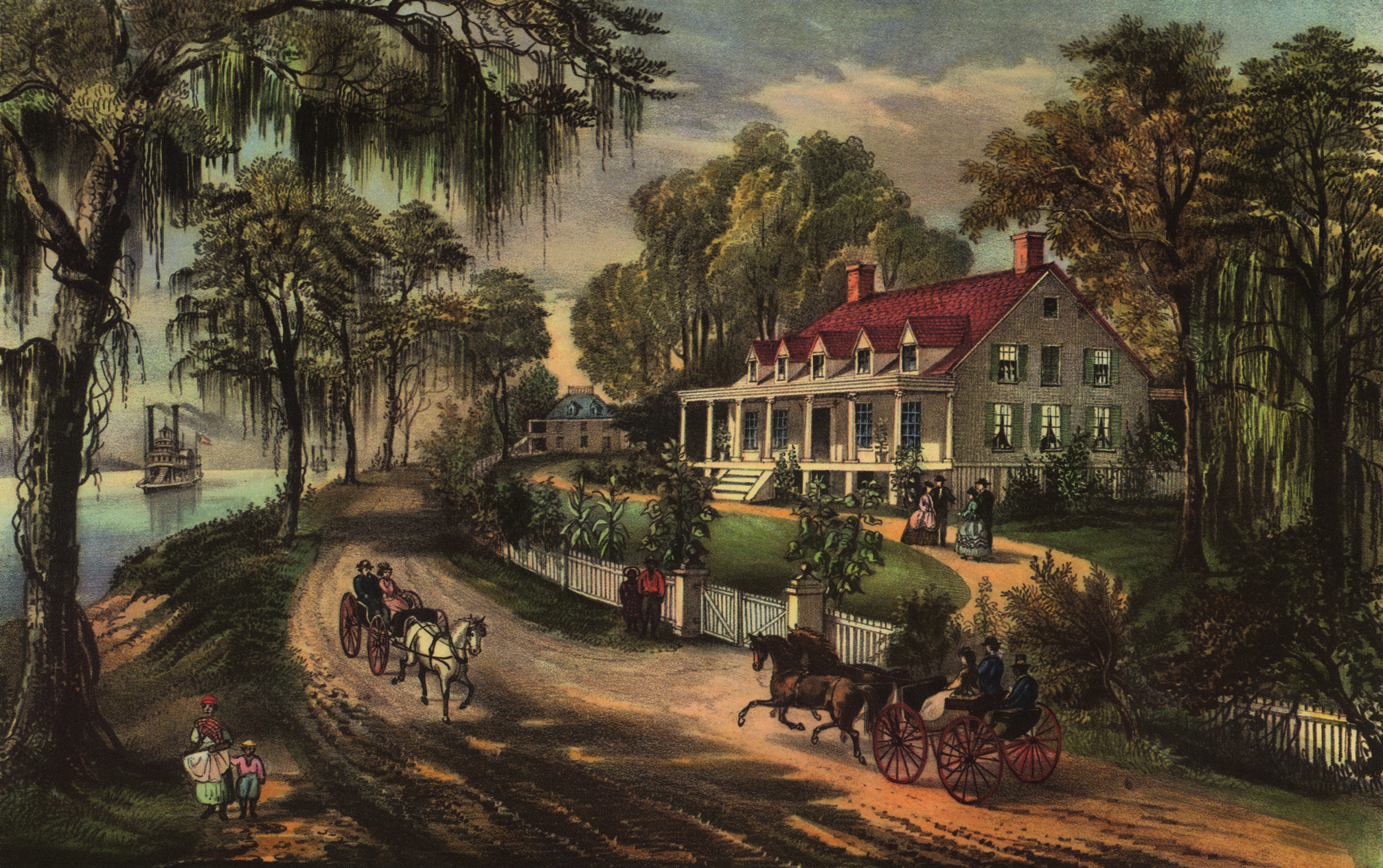
- A Home on the Mississippi, Currier and Ives, 1871

- Location within Louisiana Location within the United States
- Location: 21997 LA 23, West Pointe a la Hache, Louisiana
- Coordinates: 29°35′2.62″N 89°49′36.83″W
- Built: 1855
- Architectural style: Greek Revival, Italianate, Gothic Revival
- NRHP reference No.: 98000702
- Added to NRHP: June 18, 1998

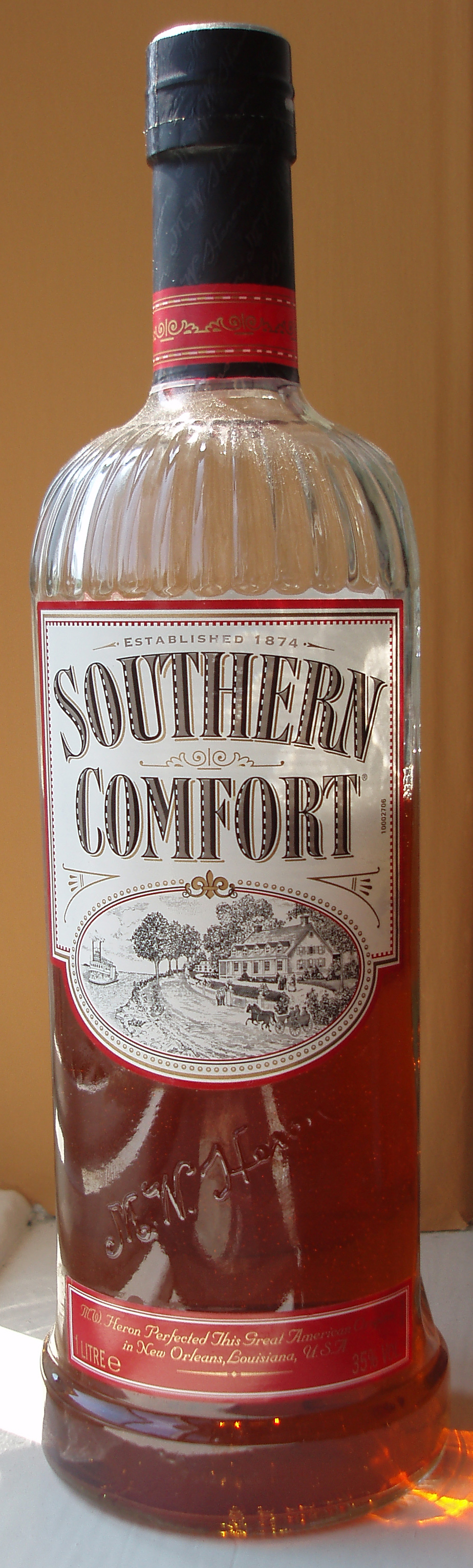
Vintage Southern Comfort bottle with label showing an illustration of Woodland Plantation. The label was subsequently redesigned in 2010.

Woodland Plantation, in West Pointe à la Hache, Louisiana, is a historic building and a former plantation house. It is located at 21997 Louisiana Highway 23 in West Pointe à la Hache, in Plaquemines Parish, Louisiana. This sugar plantation was once worked by enslaved people. It has been listed on the National Register of Historic Places since June 18, 1998.

The St. Patrick's Catholic Church was moved to the grounds of the Plantation in 1998 in order to preserve it. The church is also listed on the National Register of Historic Places.

Woodland Plantation is depicted in A Home on the Mississippi, an 1871 lithograph; which later was licensed for use on the label of Southern Comfort after Prohibition ended. Privately owned, the location has most recently operated as a bed and breakfast.

Woodland Plantation

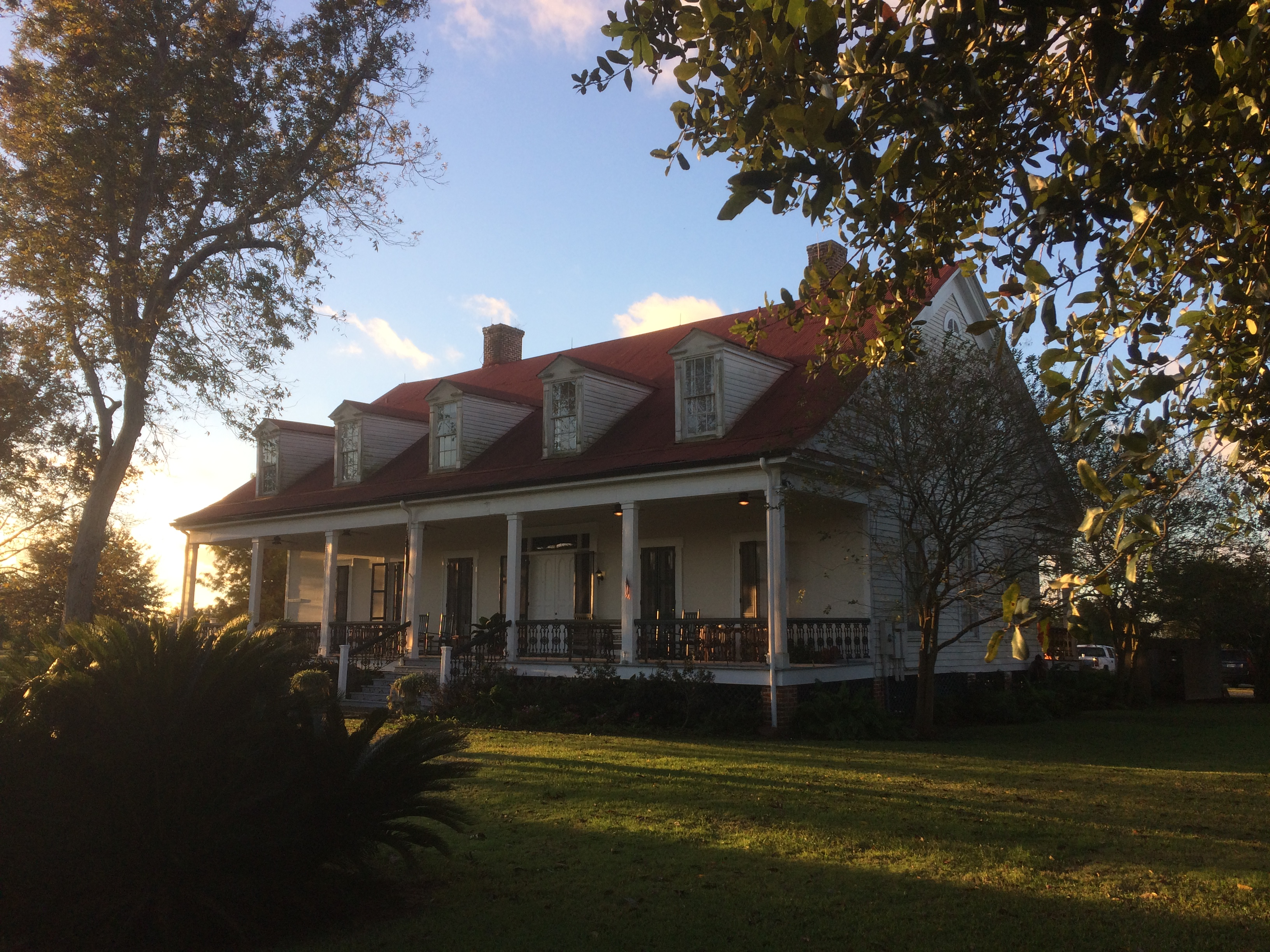
Woodland in 2016

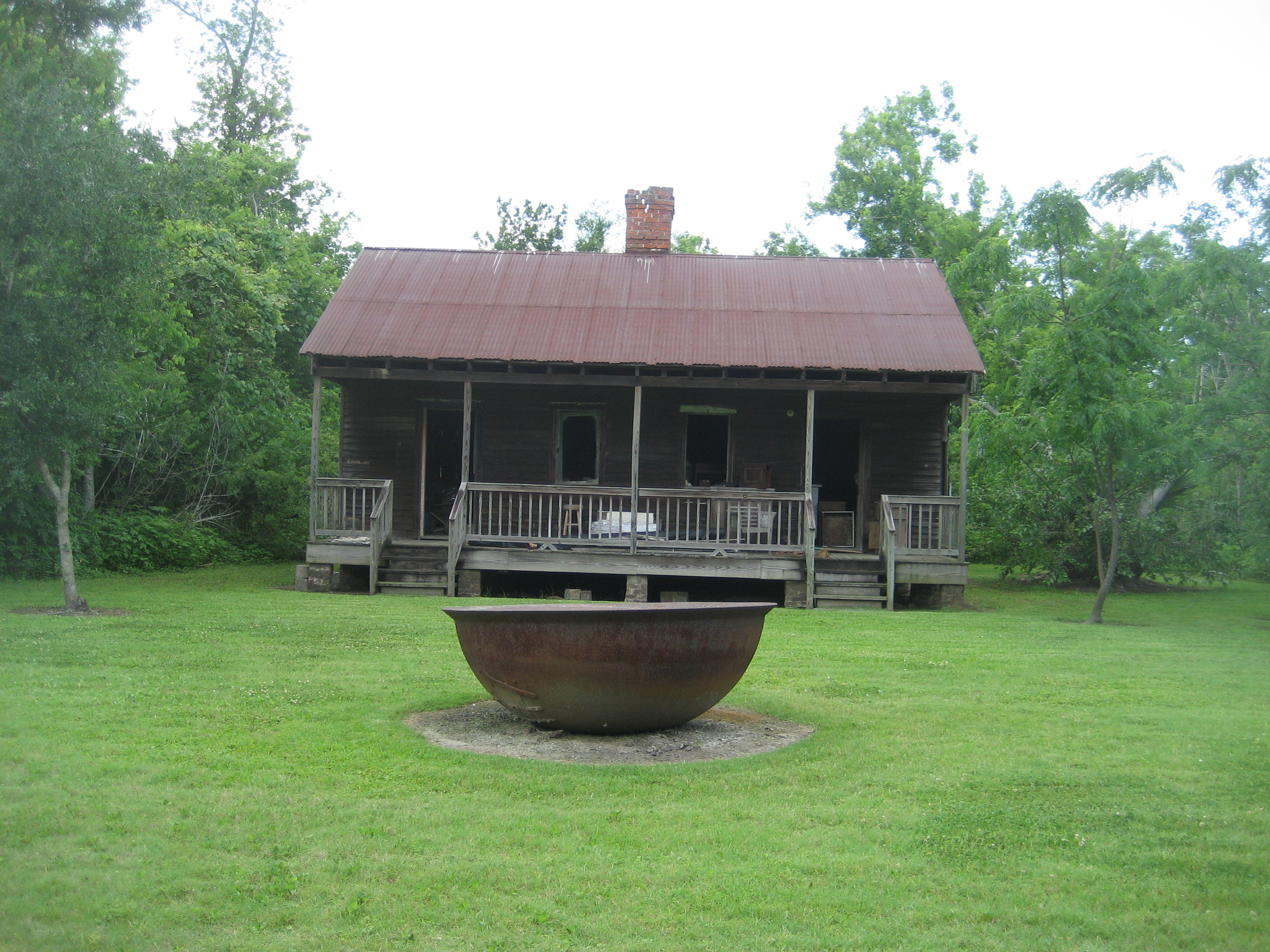
Slave cabin at Woodland

== In popular culture ==
Since the 1930s, the image on the label of Southern Comfort has been a rendering by Alfred Waud of Currier & Ives' A Home on the Mississippi, depicting Woodland Plantation. In 2010, Southern Comfort was rebranded and the company dropped the plantation image from the label.

Celebrity guests have included Jason Statham, Rosie Huntington-Whiteley, and Snoop Dogg.

== See also ==
- List of plantations in Louisiana
- National Register of Historic Places listings in Plaquemines Parish, Louisiana
