= Harlem Plantation House =

Historic house in Louisiana, United States

- U.S. National Register of Historic Places
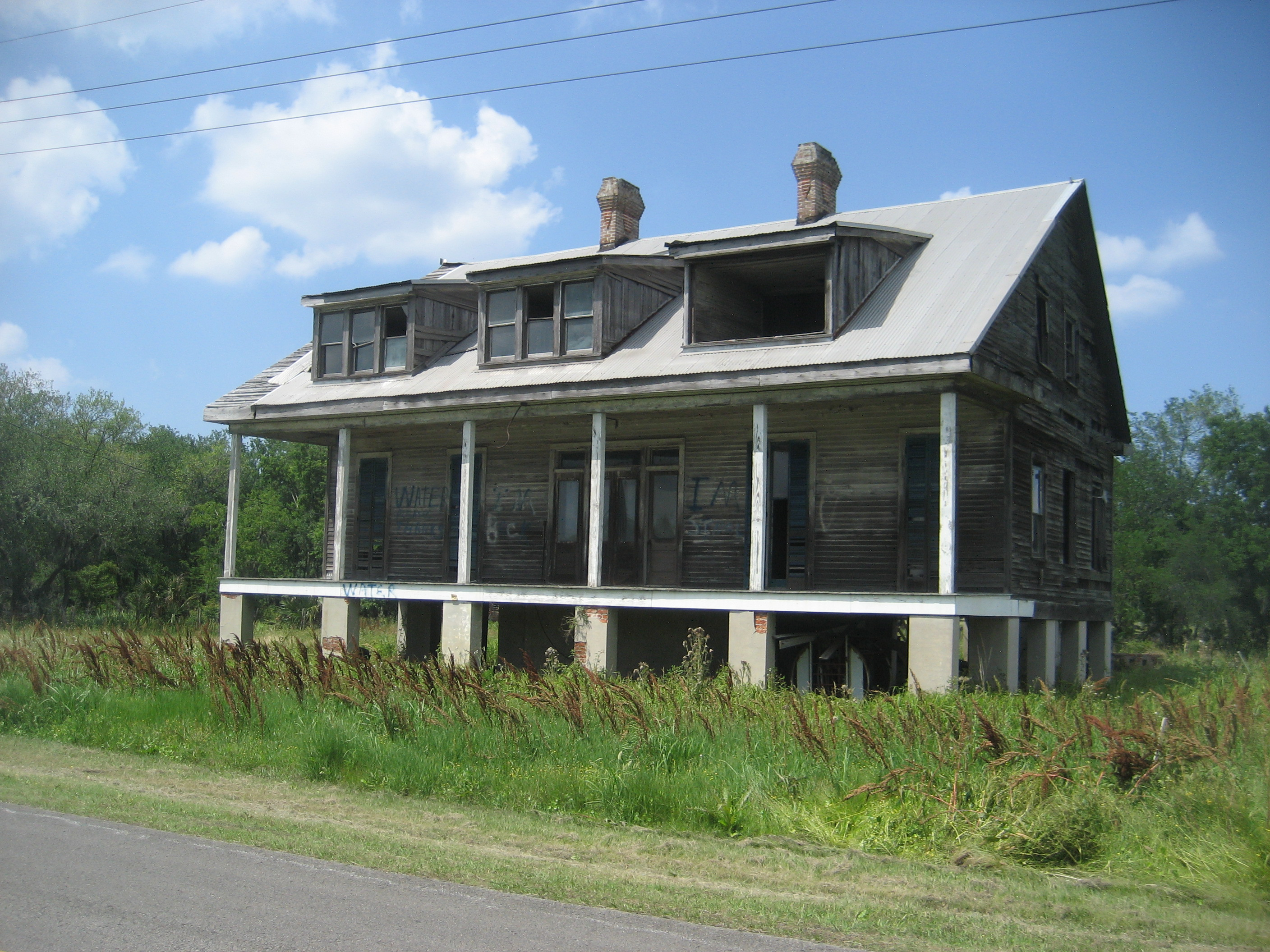
- 2010

- Location within Louisiana Location within the United States
- Nearest city: Pointe à la Hache, Louisiana
- Coordinates: 29°37′28″N 89°54′10″W
- Area: 0.4 acres (0.16 ha)
- Built: c.1840, c.1910
- NRHP reference No.: 82000451
- Added to NRHP: October 26, 1982

Harlem Plantation House is located on Louisiana Highway 39 between Davant and Phoenix, Plaquemines Parish, Louisiana, on the east bank of the Mississippi River about 5 miles (8.0 km) upriver from Pointe à la Hache, Louisiana. It was built around 1840 and added to the National Register of Historic Places on October 26, 1982. It is a raised Creole-American plantation house.

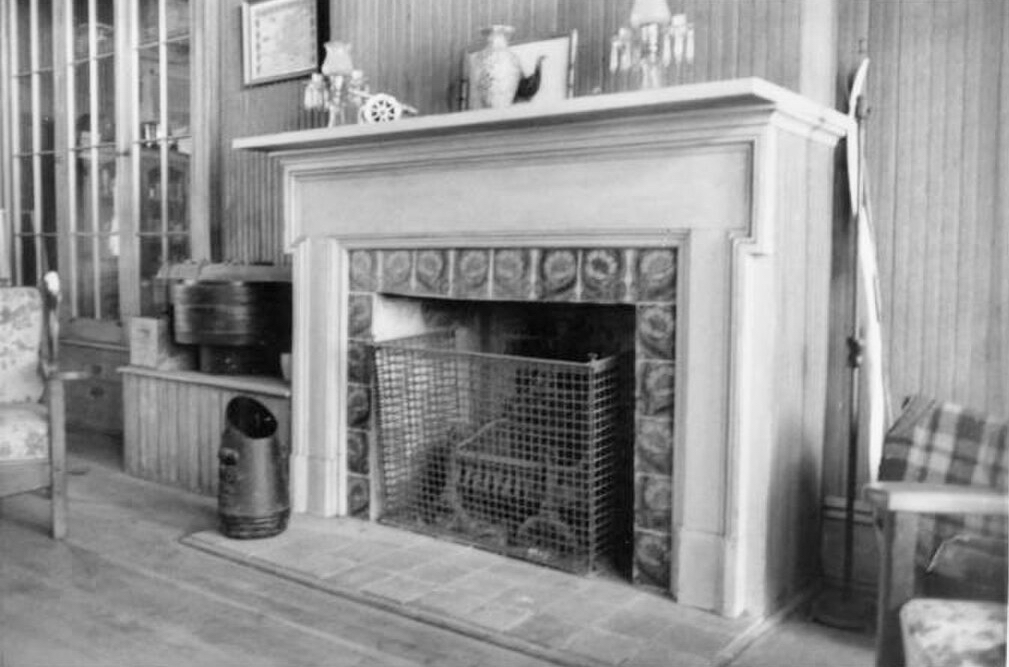
Interior fireplace in 1981

It was substantially renovated around 1910.

Like much of the area, the house was damaged by severe flooding when the levees were over-topped during Hurricane Katrina in 2005.

== See also ==
- List of plantations in Louisiana
- National Register of Historic Places listings in Plaquemines Parish, Louisiana
