= Bohemia, Louisiana =

Unincorporated community in Louisiana, U.S.

Coordinates: 29°32′37″N 89°45′20″W

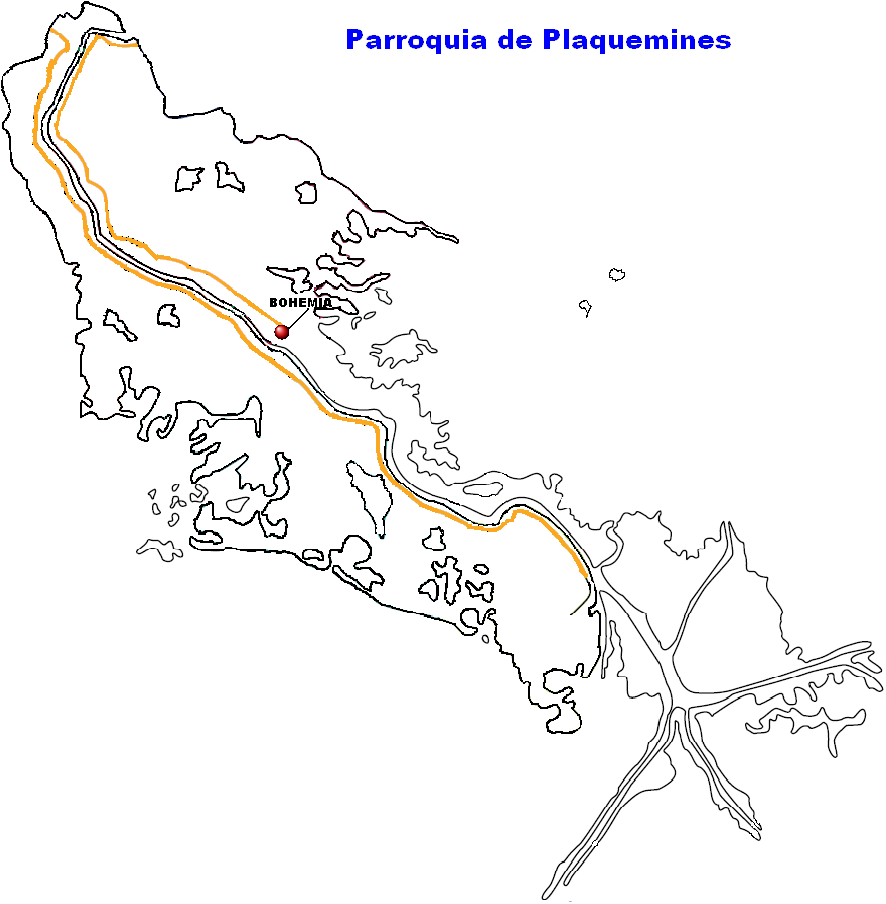
Location of Bohemia within Plaquemines Parish

Bohemia is a small unincorporated community located in the delta of the Mississippi River in the parish of Plaquemines, Louisiana, United States. The unincorporated community was affected in 2005 by Hurricane Katrina. Before Katrina made landfall, the community had a population of about 200 people, but the hurricane left only 25 homes standing.

Bohemia is located approximately 51 miles (82 km) southeast of New Orleans and is 7 feet (2.1 m) above sea level. The nearest international airport is Louis Armstrong New Orleans International Airport, 64 miles (103 km) away.

== Education ==
Plaquemines Parish School Board operates public schools serving the community. The K-12 school Phoenix High School is in Braithwaite and serves Bohemia.
