= Belle Chasse Tunnel =

Tunnel in Louisiana, U.S.

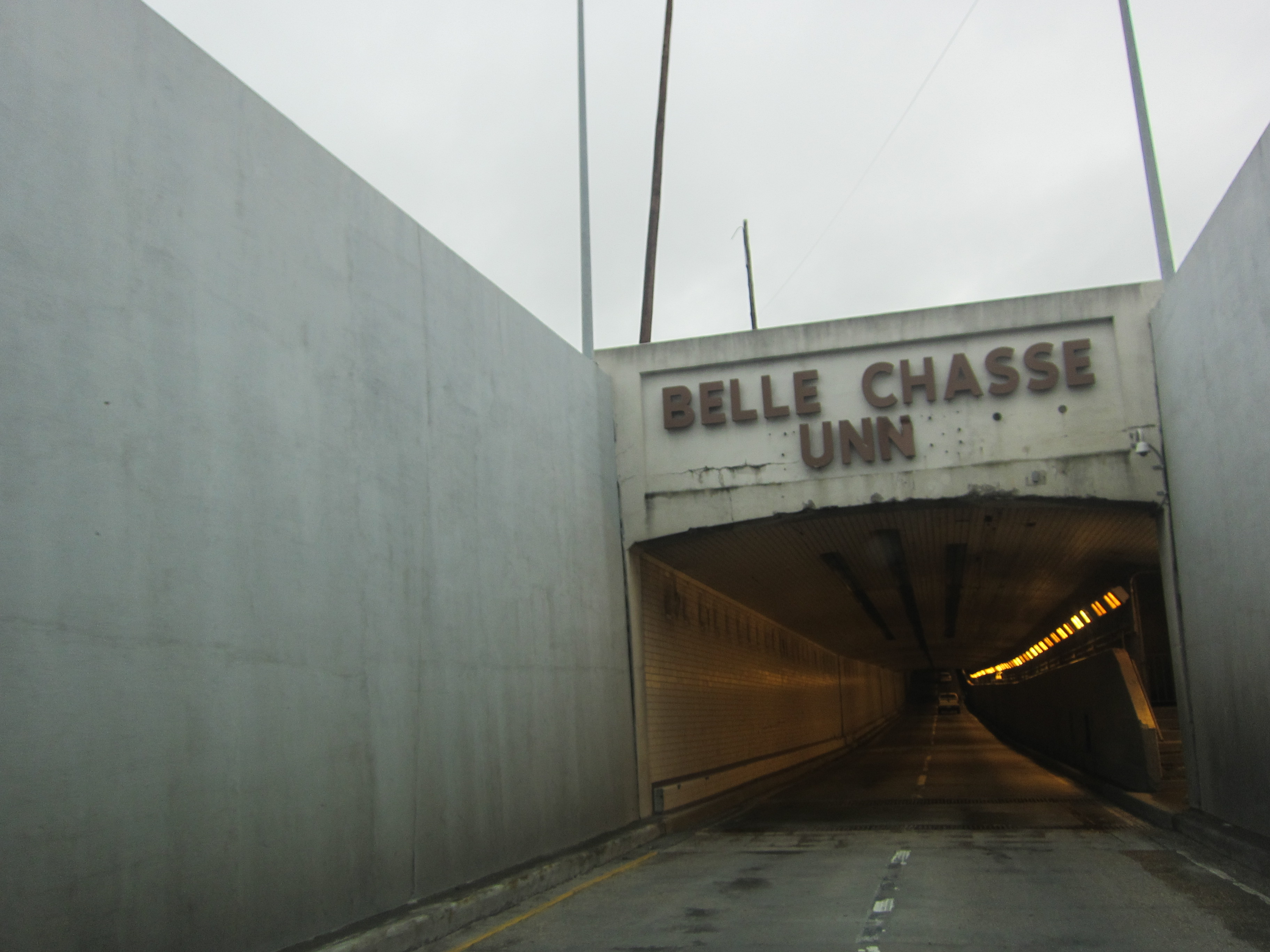
- Belle Chasse Tunnel portal

Overview
- Location: Gulf Intracoastal Waterway between Belle Chasse and Terrytown, Louisiana
- Coordinates: 29°52′18.7″N 90°0′32.0″W
- Route: LA 23 south

Operation
- Opened: February 15, 1956
- Closed: December 20, 2023
- Operator: LaDOTD

Technical
- Length: 800 feet (240 m)
- No. of lanes: 2
- Tunnel clearance: 13.6 feet (4.1 m)
- Width: 22 feet (6.7 m)

The Belle Chasse Tunnel was built starting in March 1954 to accommodate the new branch of the Intracoastal Canal. After nearly two years of construction, the $2,436,000 structure opened in February 1956 with the Canal beginning operations later that year. The politicians in Plaquemines Parish chose to construct a tunnel as opposed to a drawbridge as to enable continuous flow of traffic. According to engineers and various 1956 issues of the Plaquemines Gazette, the tunnel was the first fully automatic underwater tunnel in the world as it did not require any operating personnel. The tunnel had ventilation machinery that automatically change the tunnel's air every two minutes with automatic generators taking over if the machinery fails.

Judge Leander Perez enabled the tunnel's construction by passing a constitutional amendment through the Plaquemines Parish Police Jury. He sold bonds towards construction with the US Corps of Engineers paying the remainder of the construction fees. When the tunnel opened, it was the first underwater tunnel in Louisiana. Shortly after, two new tunnels were built in the state: the Harvey Tunnel which once carried traffic from the Westbank Expressway and the Houma Tunnel.

The tunnel was the primary means of carrying traffic to and from Belle Chasse and westbank Plaquemines Parish. Since its opening, hazardous cargo is prohibited from travelling through the tunnel, and numerous additional regulations/restrictions have been enforced. Traffic counts soon overwhelmed the tunnel, and in 1967, construction of the Judge Perez Bridge, a vertical-lift bridge, commenced, and that structure opened in 1968 to serve northbound traffic and, whenever the tunnel is closed for maintenance, southbound traffic.

The tunnel was heavily used by commuters to and from New Orleans and surrounding areas. It sported a solid white line that prohibits passing inside the structure. It also experienced flooding problems fairly often and was one of many structures closed after Hurricane Katrina.

It received improvements in 2012 to reduce potential damage by hurricanes.

The tunnel was permanently closed on December 20, 2023 as traffic was rerouted on the newly constructed Belle Chasse Bridge.

== See also ==
- LA-23
- Judge Perez Bridge
- Westbank Expressay
- Harvey Tunnel
- Belle Chasse
- Plaquemines Parish
