= Judge Perez Bridge =

Vertical-lift bridge in Louisiana

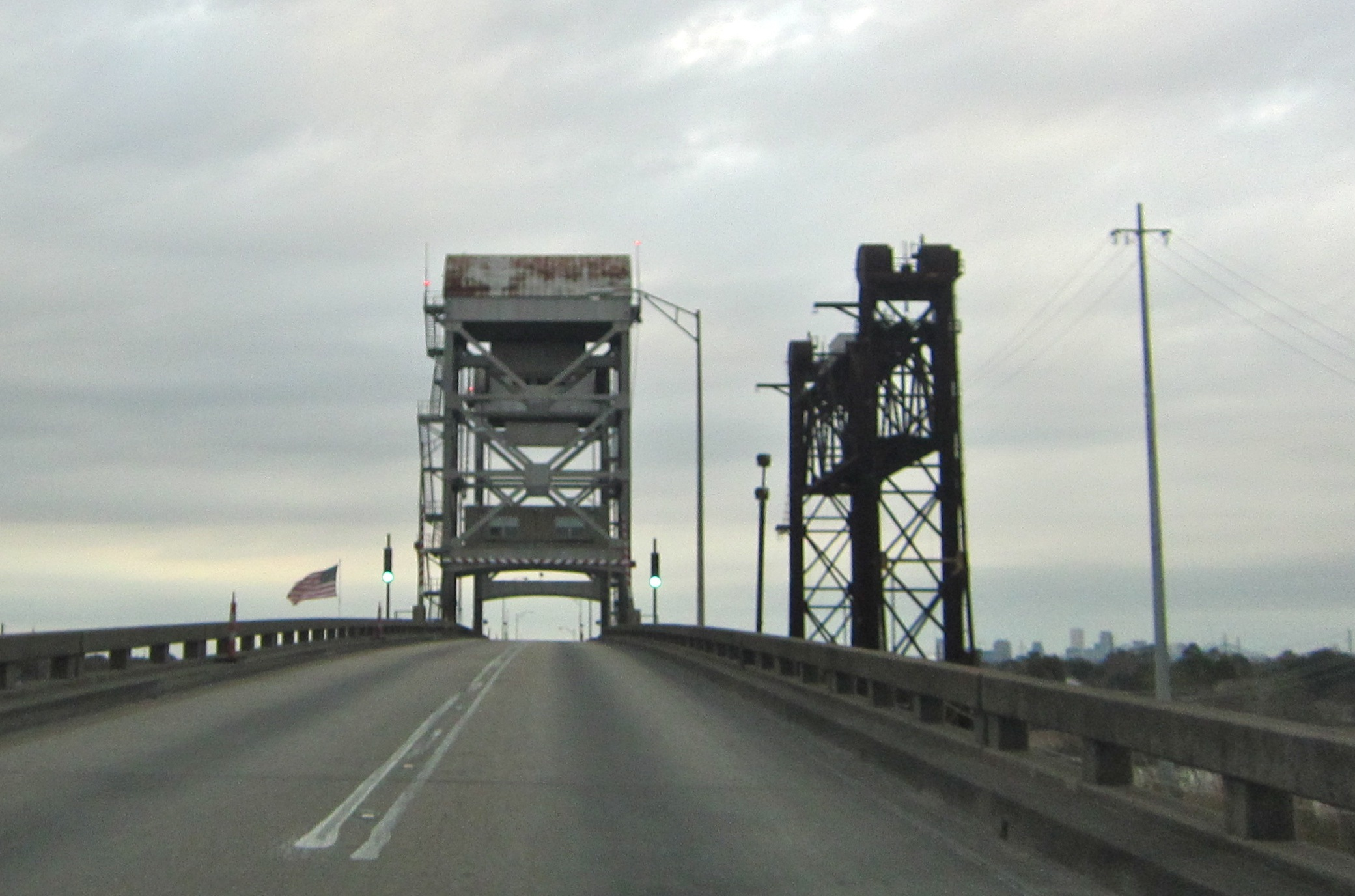
- View from car approaching the bridge's lift span. At right is an adjacent railroad bridge.
- Coordinates: 29°52′18.7″N 90°0′32.0″W
- Carries: 2 lanes of LA 23 north
- Crosses: Gulf Intracoastal Waterway
- Locale: Belle Chasse and Terrytown, Louisiana
- Official name: Judge Perez Bridge
- Other name(s): Belle Chasse Bridge
- Maintained by: LaDOTD

Characteristics
- Design: Vertical-lift bridge
- Total length: 2,557.4 feet (779.5 m)
- Width: 28.2 feet (8.6 m)
- Longest span: 150 feet (46 m)
- Clearance below: 100 feet (open), 40 feet (closed)

History
- Opened: September 10, 1968
- Closed: March 16, 2025

The Judge Perez Bridge, also known as the Belle Chasse Bridge, was a vertical-lift bridge in the U.S. state of Louisiana which carried northbound Louisiana Highway 23 over the Gulf Intracoastal Waterway between Belle Chasse and Terrytown. The bridge was paired with the Belle Chasse Tunnel which carried southbound LA 23. Construction began in March 1967, and the bridge opened for traffic in September 1968. It was plagued with mechanical issues since it opened. Commuters had to back down off the bridge due to a malfunction.

== History ==
The bridge was built to relieve traffic from the Belle Chasse Tunnel. It was named after Leander Perez, a local political boss and segregationist. It was part of a parish project of four-laning Highway 23 throughout the road's entire length to Venice. According to the Plaquemines Gazette, the $3.3 million structure was built by Plaquemines Parish using its Parish Royalty Road Fund without charge to local taxpayers. Boh Brothers worked on its construction.

Construction for replacing the tunnel and lift bridge with new high-rise bridge, was completed and opened to traffic on March 17, 2025.
