= Louisiana Gateway Port =

Seaport in Louisiana, United States

- Interactive map of Louisiana Gateway Port

Location
- Country: United States
- Location: Plaquemines Parish, Louisiana
- Coordinates: 29°34′03″N 89°49′08″W
- UN/LOCODE: USPLQ

Details
- Owned by: Plaquemines Port, Harbor & Terminal District
- Land area: 1,691.8 acres (684.6 ha)
- Size: 548 acres (222 ha) developed
- No. of berths: 14
- Draft depth: 50 ft (15 m)
- Air draft: No restriction
- Length of approach channel: 81 mi (130 km)
- Street access: LA 23 / LA 39

Louisiana Gateway Port is a deepwater port operated by the Plaquemines Port, Harbor & Terminal District located at the mouth of the Mississippi River on the Gulf of Mexico in Plaquemines Parish, Louisiana, United States. The port authority's jurisdiction extends along the first 81 miles (130 km) of the Mississippi River from the Gulf inland. It plays a significant role in maritime trade, serving domestic and international markets.

== Overview ==
The Louisiana Gateway Port is among the largest seaports in the United States, with deep-water access and connectivity that facilitates trade to inland markets. The port's strategic location—in Belle Chasse near the closest point on the Mississippi River to the Gulf of Mexico—gives it navigational advantages, including an authorized channel depth of approximately 50 feet and no air draft restrictions, allowing it to handle large vessels.

The port supports a diversity of cargo including oil, gas, grain, coal, chemicals, liquefied natural gas (LNG), and other bulk commodities, and provides access to over 30 U.S. states via barge, rail, and highway transportation networks.

== History ==
The port authority was originally established in 1954 as the Plaquemines Port, Harbor & Terminal District by the Louisiana Legislature. It was governed by a committee of the Plaquemines Parish Council acting as the Port Board.

In March 2025, the port authority officially rebranded to Louisiana Gateway Port to better reflect its strategic role as a key gateway for global trade and its ambitions for expanded capacity and international recognition. The rebranding was part of a broader strategic vision to position the port among the top U.S. ports by tonnage and enhance its identity in global shipping and logistics.

== Governance ==
The Plaquemines Port, Harbor and Terminal District, operating as the Louisiana Gateway Port, is governed by the Plaquemines Parish Council, which serves as the Board of Commissioners. The board is composed of nine commissioners who are elected to four-year terms as council members from their respective districts.

As of January 2026, the board members include:

- District 1: Tyronne Edwards
- District 2: Brian Champagne
- District 3: Chris Schulz
- District 4: Stuart Guey
- District 5: Patricia L. McCarty
- District 6: Lloyd "Ronnie" Newsom (chairman)
- District 7: Carlton M. LaFrance Sr. (Vice Chairman)
- District 8: Mitch Jurisich
- District 9: Mark Cognevich

== Facilities and operations ==
The port's jurisdiction includes deep-draft channels, multiple anchorages, and extensive waterfront property suitable for a range of maritime facilities. Its transportation links connect maritime operations to inland distribution networks via rail and highway. Intermodal access enhances the port's attractiveness for a wide variety of cargo flows.

Major private and public investments are underway or planned to increase capacity and service offerings. These include partnerships for container terminal development and infrastructure enhancements to support larger vessels and expanded cargo volumes. These developments include a strategic partnership with APM Terminals to build a state-of-the-art $467 million container terminal, with construction set to begin in 2027.

Since 2022, the port district has also operated the Belle Chasse–Scarsdale and Pointe à la Hache ferries.

== Liquefied natural gas and energy exports ==
The port area is home to an liquefied natural gas export terminal that began operations in late 2024, reflecting the region's role in global energy trade. Additional expansion projects in energy infrastructure within the port's jurisdiction continue to reinforce its importance in LNG exports.

== Economic impact ==
The Louisiana Gateway Port is a major economic contributor, providing employment opportunities, facilitating trade, and serving as a logistical hub linking the Mississippi River corridor with global markets. Its access to inland states and proximity to global shipping routes positions it as a key node in national and international commerce.
