= List of places named for the phoenix =

The phoenix has provided the name for a number of locations, including cities and towns, and notable structures. Following is a list of places named for the phoenix.

United States

- Phoenix, Arizona
- Phoenix, Illinois
- Phoenix, Louisiana
- Phoenix, Maryland
- Phoenix, Michigan
- Phoenix, New York
- Phoenix, Oregon
- Phoenixville, Pennsylvania

Other countries

- Vacoas-Phoenix, Mauritius
- Phoenix, Durban, South Africa
- Phoenix Islands, Kiribati
- Phoenix Park, Dublin, Ireland
- Phoenix Concert Theatre, Toronto, Canada
- Phoenix Cinema, London, England
- Phoenix, British Columbia, Canada
- La Fenice (The Phoenix), an opera house in Venice, Italy
- Camp Phoenix, US Army military camp located in Kabul, Afghanistan

== See also ==
- Phoenix (disambiguation)
