= A Home on the Mississippi =

Painting by Currier and Ives

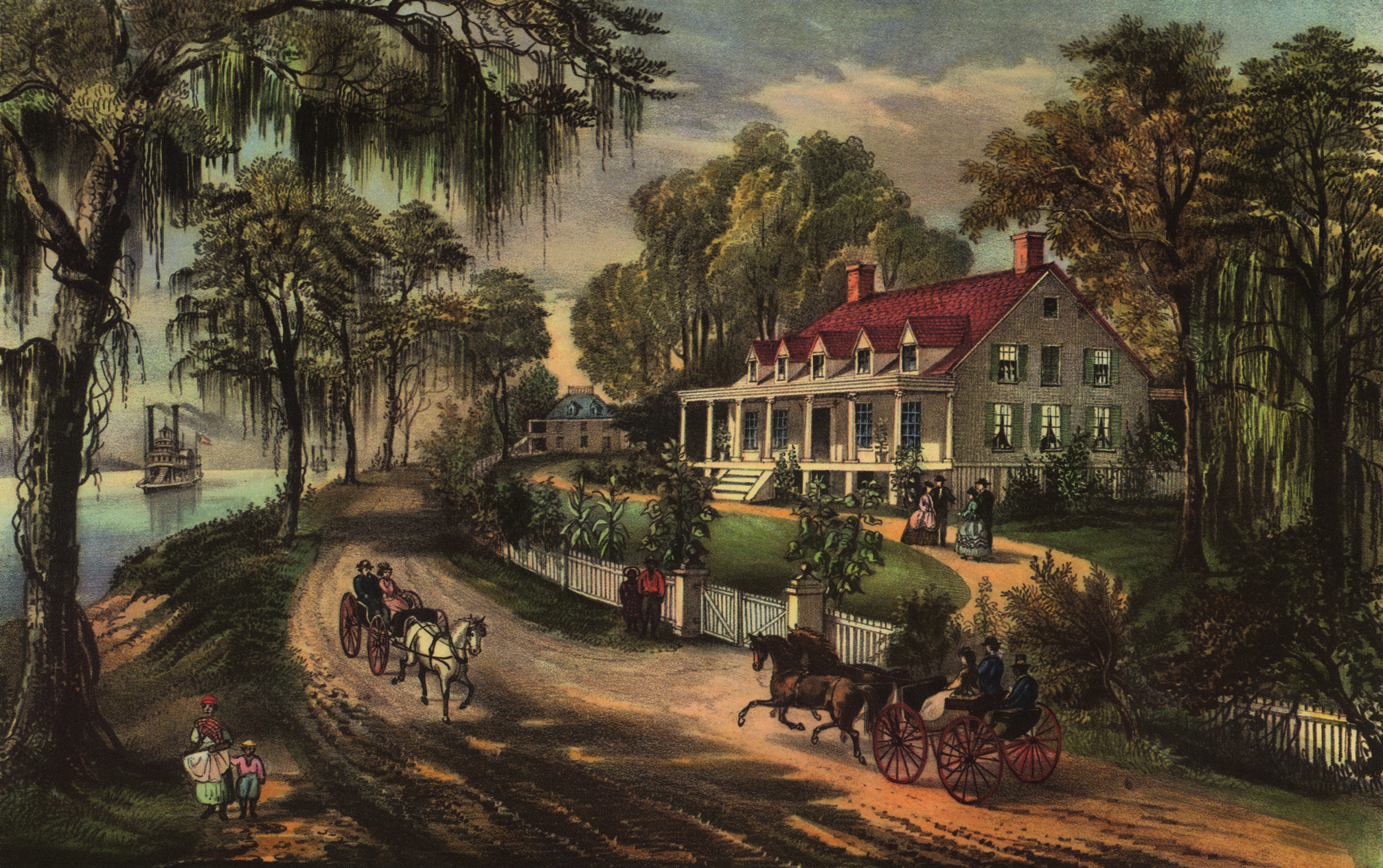
- Artist: Alfred Waud, Currier and Ives
- Year: 1871
- Type: Chromolithograph
- Dimensions: 21.6 cm × 34.3 cm (8.5 in × 13.5 in)
- Location: Library of Congress, Washington D.C., United States

A Home on the Mississippi is an 1871 rendering commissioned by the United States government as part of a documentary program on the Mississippi River. The scene is an original work by Alfred Waud depicting Woodland Plantation, an antebellum mansion in West Pointe à la Hache, Louisiana.

== History ==
The image first achieved notability when published as a chromolithograph by Currier and Ives. After the end of Prohibition in 1933, Currier and Ives licensed the image to the makers of Southern Comfort, who continued to use the lithograph on their liqueur labels until 2010. Woodland Plantation, which is registered on the National Register of Historic Places, now provides bed-and-breakfast accommodation.
