= Fort De La Boulaye Site =

- Fort De La Boulaye
- U.S. National Register of Historic Places
- U.S. National Historic Landmark
- Location within Louisiana Location within the United States
- Nearest city: Phoenix, Plaquemines Parish, Louisiana, U.S.A.
- Coordinates: 29°38′57″N 89°56′40″W
- Built: 1699–1700
- NRHP reference No.: 66000378

Significant dates
- Added to NRHP: October 15, 1966
- Designated NHL: October 9, 1960

Fort De La Boulaye Site, also known as Fort Mississippi, is the site of a fort built by the French in south Louisiana in 1699–1700, to support their claim of the Mississippi River and valley. Native Americans forced the French to vacate the fort by 1707.

The site was declared a National Historic Landmark in 1960, as part of the history of French colonization of the area. The state of Louisiana had earlier erected an historical marker, with the following text: FORT de la BOULAYE First white settlement in present-day Louisiana, erected by Bienville in 1699 on this spot (then the bank of the Mississippi), prevented Britain's seizure of the Mississippi Valley.

== History ==
In 1698, Pierre Le Moyne d'Iberville, and his brothers, Jean-Baptiste Le Moyne de Bienville and Antoine Le Moyne de Châteauguay, participated in an expedition to rediscover the mouth of the Mississippi River. It could be difficult to find among the many competing bayous and waterways.

In 1699, they founded Fort Mississippi on a ridge a little more than one kilometer from the shore of the river, on the east bank, and about twenty kilometers south of the future city of New Orleans. The fort was completed in 1700. Its building process was described in an account by Jesuit priest Paul du Ru, who accompanied Iberville's expedition. The fort was built in stockade wood and defended by six guns, in order to protect the region from attacks and incursions by the English and Spanish. The fort was renamed Fort de la Boulaye and was commanded by Louis Juchereau de St. Denis.

In 1707, the Caddoan tribe, hostile to the presence of encroaching soldiers, forced them to abandon the fort and to go to the French settlement of Biloxi. Only the officer Juchereau de St. Denis, friend of the Caddo, was permitted to continue living in the fort. Garrisons of French troops occasionally visited the site. In 1714, Juchereau de St. Denis was assigned to lead a new expedition, with the objective of defending the western boundaries of Louisiana (New France). He established Fort des Natchitoches.

By the middle of the 18th century, Fort de la Boulaye was abandoned. Tropical storms eventually destroyed this fort.

In the 20th century archaeologists conducted surveys and located the site of fort; they found remnants of palisade and building logs, burned poles, and evidence of a cannonball. The site has been designated a National Historic Landmark.

== See also ==
- Fort de la Balize
- Fort Jackson
- Fort St. Philip
- National Register of Historic Places listings in Plaquemines Parish, Louisiana
- List of National Historic Landmarks in Louisiana
