= Pointe à la Hache Ferry =

Coordinates: 29.573°N 89.795°W

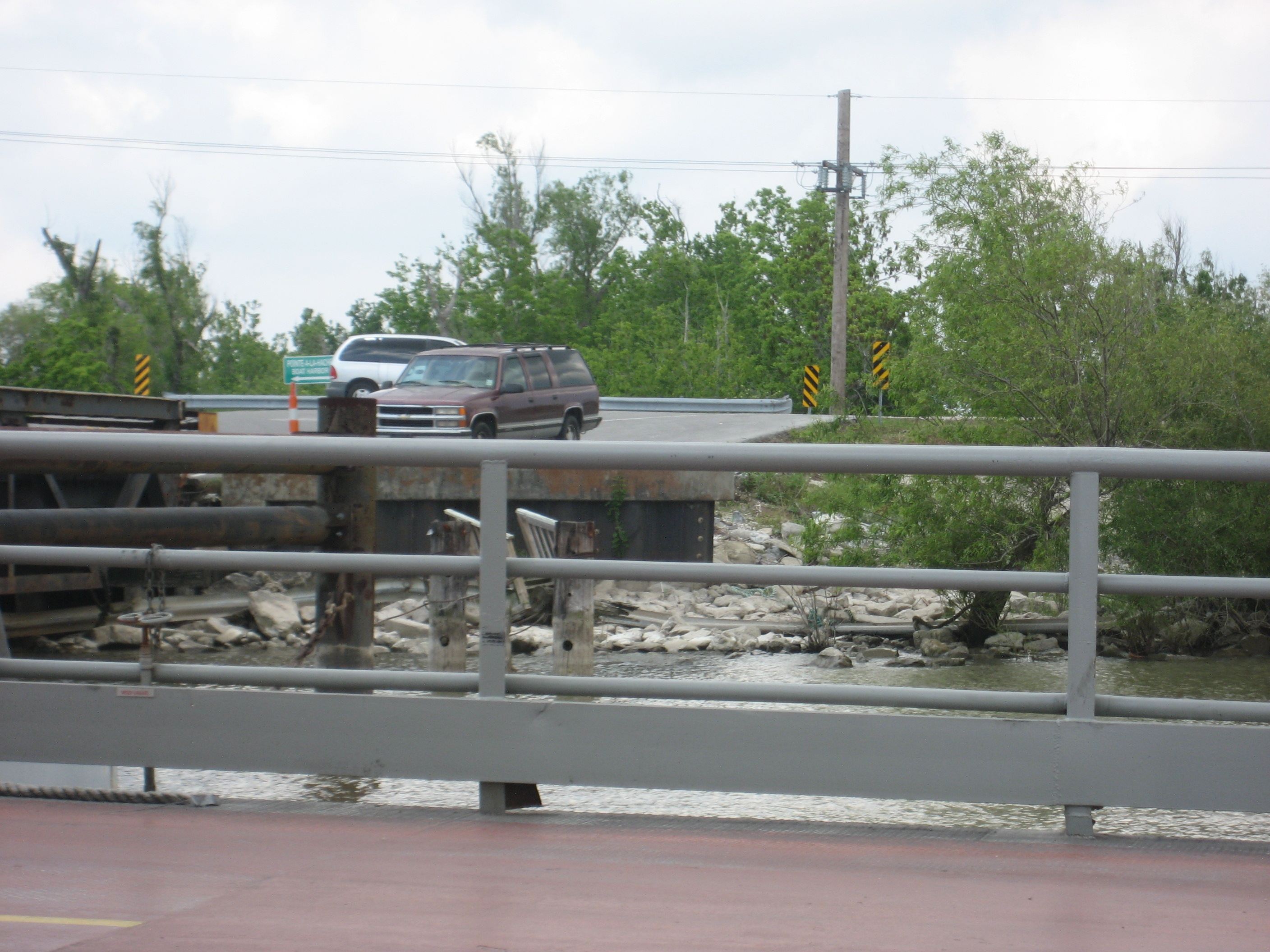
Pointe à la Hache Ferry landing

The Pointe à la Hache Ferry or Pointe a la Hache Ferry, is a ferry across the Mississippi River in the U.S. state of Louisiana, connecting West Pointe à la Hache and Pointe à la Hache in Plaquemines Parish, Louisiana. The ferry is operated by the Louisiana Gateway Port. The agency also operates the Belle Chasse–Scarsdale Ferry.

Currently, it is $1 for single or double axle vehicles, three or more axles are $2. It is the southernmost vehicle crossing of the Mississippi. The east bank side of the ferry is near the end of paved roadway; on the west bank the river road continues down to Venice, Louisiana. As the east bank of Plaquemines Parish has little population in the aftermath of Hurricane Katrina, ferry service to the east bank occurs at the top of every hour between 6 AM and 10 PM, as well as at 6:30 AM. Likewise, ferry service to the west bank occurs at 6:15 AM, 6:45 AM, and on the bottom of every hour between 7:30 AM and 10:30 PM.

== History ==
Ferry service began at this site in June 1933. Although the ferry originally carried a toll, it was also free at some points in its history.

On January 9, 2013, the ferry was closed due to safety issues with the ferry landing. In May 2013, it was reopened for light traffic (including passenger cars and pickup-trucks, but not for large trucks or buses).

== See also ==
- List of crossings of the Lower Mississippi River
