= Martin Wilkes Heron =

Creator of Southern Comfort liqueur

Martin Wilkes Heron (July 4, 1850 – April 17, 1920) was an Irish American bartender, saloon-keeper, and liquor manufacturer best known for creating the liqueur known as Southern Comfort. He is often credited as being the "original mixologist" long before the term became widely popular.

== Life ==
Heron was born in Ireland.

According to the Brown-Forman Corporation (manufacturers of Southern Comfort), in the early 1870s Heron was living in New Orleans, working as a liquor rectifier and bar tender. According to company "legend" Heron created the formula for Southern Comfort (reportedly originally known as "Cuffs and Buttons") in 1874 while working at Arthur McCauley's saloon at the southeast corner of the intersection of Richard Street and South Peters Street in the Lower Garden District section of New Orleans.

By 1883 Heron had returned to St. Louis, where he was employed by A.M. Hellman & Company Liquor Wholesalers. Helman & Co. was a partnership owned by Abraham Hellman and Myer Harris, located at 122 Pine St. in downtown St. Louis. Heron lived at 3004 Pine.

He later moved to Memphis, Tennessee, where he operated as a "Liquor Dealer". Heron's Memphis business (and residence) was located at 515 Main St.

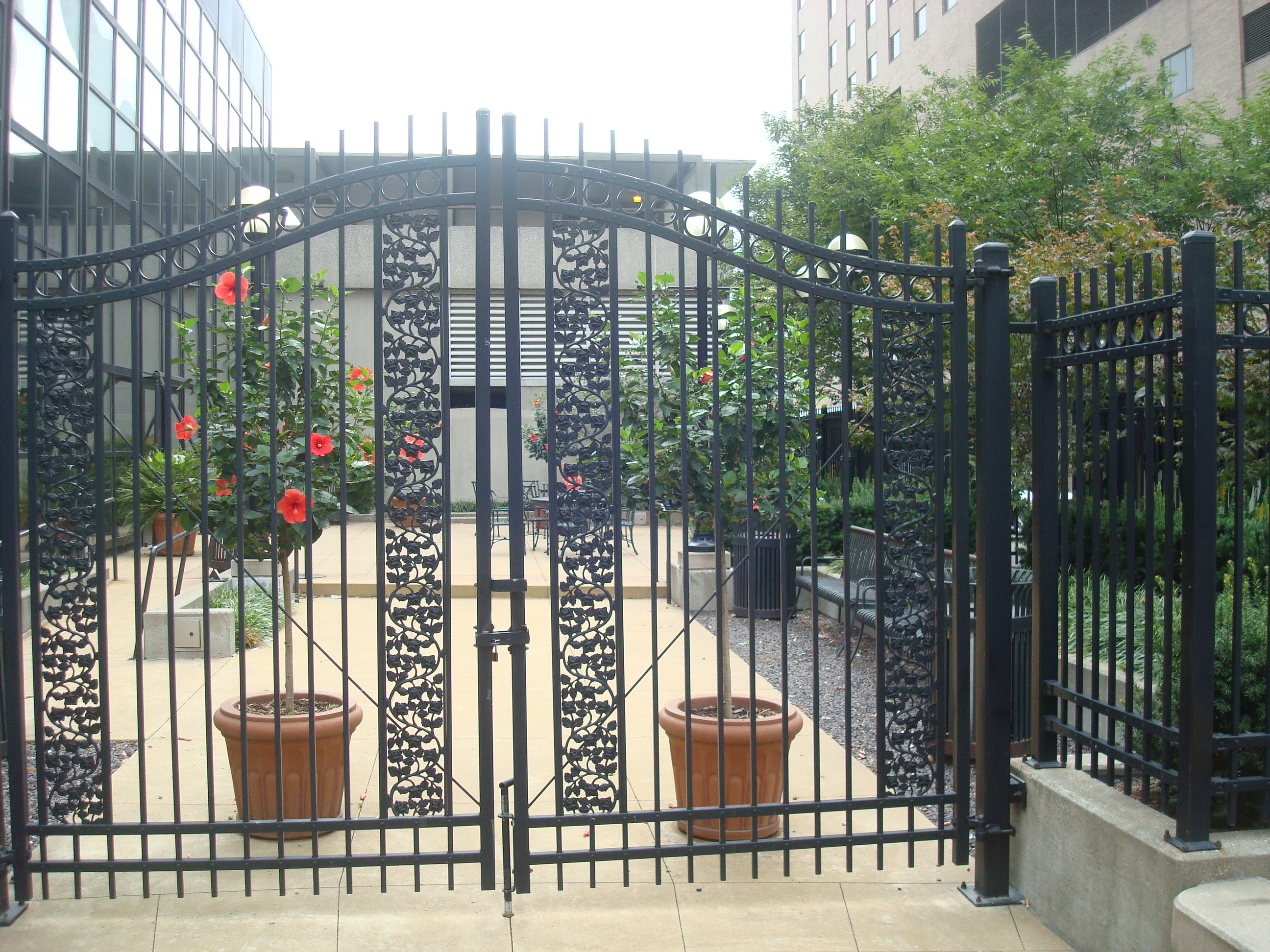
Garden gate at the former location of Heron's St. Louis "saloon"

In 1889 Heron patented his formula, and began selling it in sealed bottles with the slogans, "W.H. Heron's Famous Southern Comfort" and "None Genuine But Mine". By 1890, Heron hired an assistant, Grant M. Peoples who served as clerk and book keeper. Peoples worked with him for the rest of his life, producing and marketing Southern Comfort.

By 1910 Heron returned to St. Louis, Missouri, where he operated a drinking establishment on the St Louis river front and continued to market Southern Comfort. He served a "St. Louis Cocktail" which included Southern Comfort. His bar featured a sign which informed patrons: "Two per customer. No Gentleman would ask for more." Mr. Heron's "saloon" was famed for the high quality of his liquors, its "ante-bellum gentility", and the host's skill as a raconteur.

Gould's St Louis Red Book (a city business directory) located Heron's saloon at 319 Pine Street near the St. Louis riverfront. The former location of Heron's tavern is approximately 1000 feet from the north leg of Gateway Arch at the Gateway Arch National Park (the current day location of the garden cafe at the St. Louis Crowne Plaza Hotel).

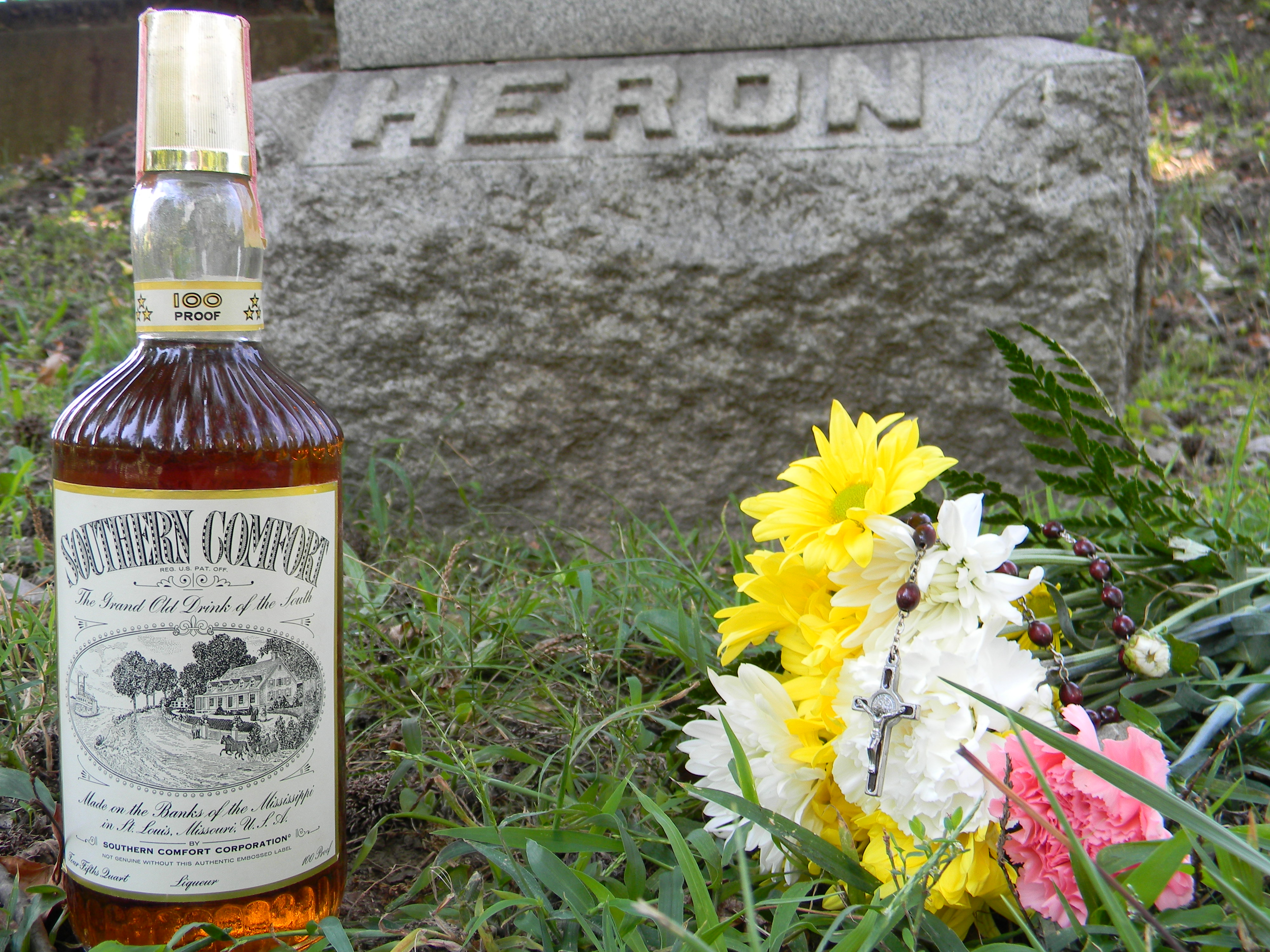
Martin Wilkes Heron's grave

In his old age, Wilkes lived at 4950 McPherson Ave, in a St. Louis neighborhood now known as the Central West End. Martin Wilkes Heron died in St. Louis on April 17, 1920. He left an estate valued in excess of $90,000 (in 1921) with the majority of assets being distributed to family members. His Pine street establishment and his liquor patents were left to his business associate Mr. Peoples. Heron is buried in his family's plot in Calvary Cemetery in St. Louis He does not have an individual headstone, but his grave lies directly in front of the family plot marker, which is topped by an individual stone dedicated to his sister Margaret.

== Awards ==
In 1900, the liqueur was awarded a gold medal at the Exposition Universalle (the 1900 Paris World's Fair). In 1904 Heron was awarded a Gold Medal for Southern Comfort at the Louisiana Purchase Exposition (the St. Louis World's Fair).
