= St. Patrick's Catholic Church (West Pointe à la Hache, Louisiana) =

Historic church in Louisiana, United States

- U.S. National Register of Historic Places
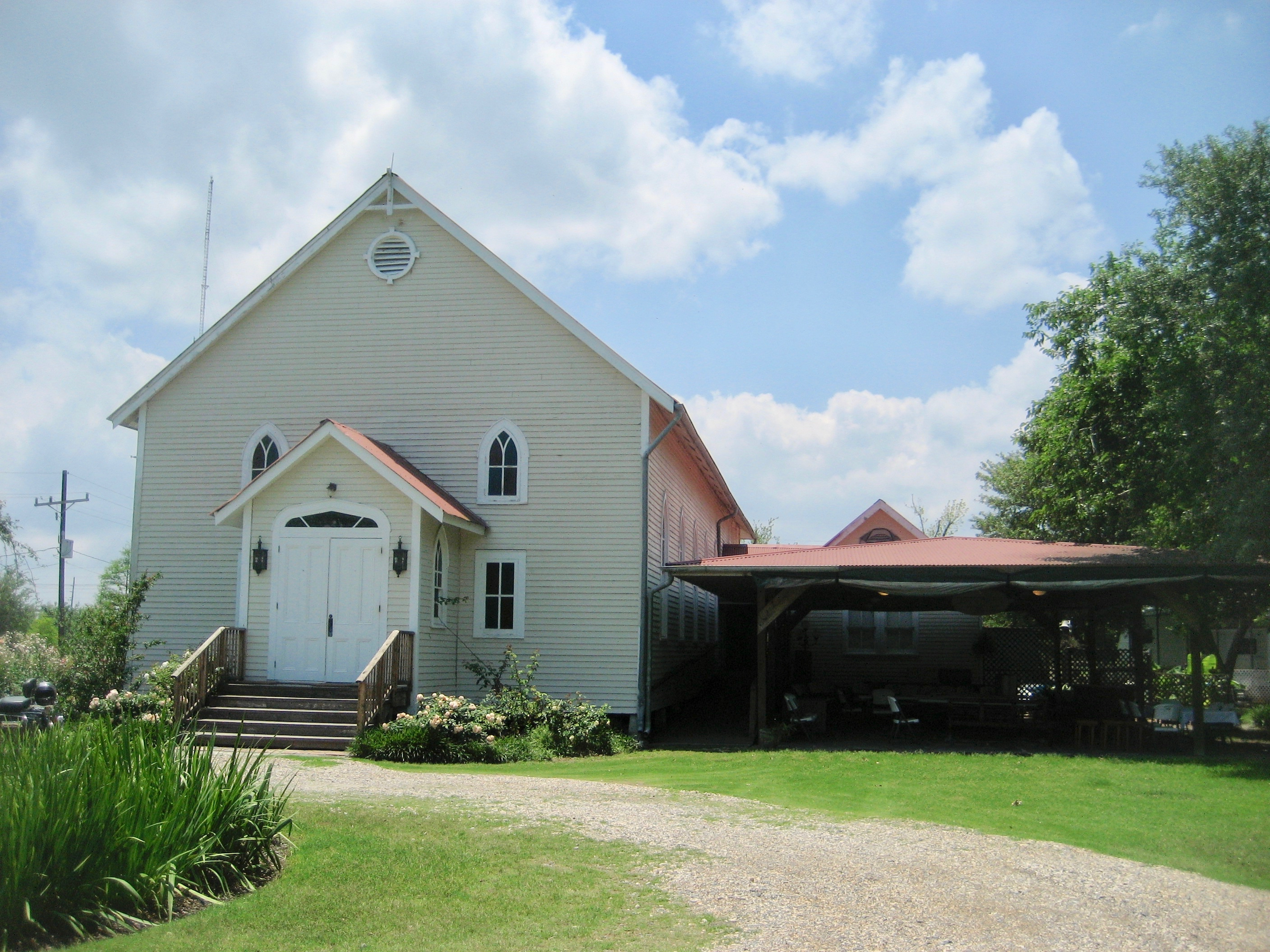
- Spirits Hall in May 2010

- Location within Louisiana Location within the United States
- Location: 21997 LA 23, West Pointe a'la Hache, Louisiana
- Coordinates: 29°27′9″N 89°37′34″W
- Area: less than one acre
- Built: 1918
- Built by: John Edgecombs and Sons
- Architectural style: Gothic Revival
- NRHP reference No.: 99001571
- Added to NRHP: December 17, 1999

The St. Patrick's Catholic Church, renamed Spirits Hall, is in West Pointe à la Hache, Louisiana, United States, is a historic former Roman Catholic church. It is located at 21997 LA 23, on the west bank of the Mississippi River.

== History ==
The wood-frame building was constructed in 1918 and added to the National Register of Historic Places in 1999.

It was built in 1918 to replace a previous church destroyed by a hurricane in 1915. The church includes some elements of Gothic Revival architecture. It used some materials salvaged from the former church.

The church was moved a short distance in 1937, from the east side of Louisiana Highway 23 in Port Sulphur to the west side. And it was somewhat enlarged then.

It was moved upriver to its current location in Woodland Sugar Plantation in 1998 and a further addition to the church was then added.

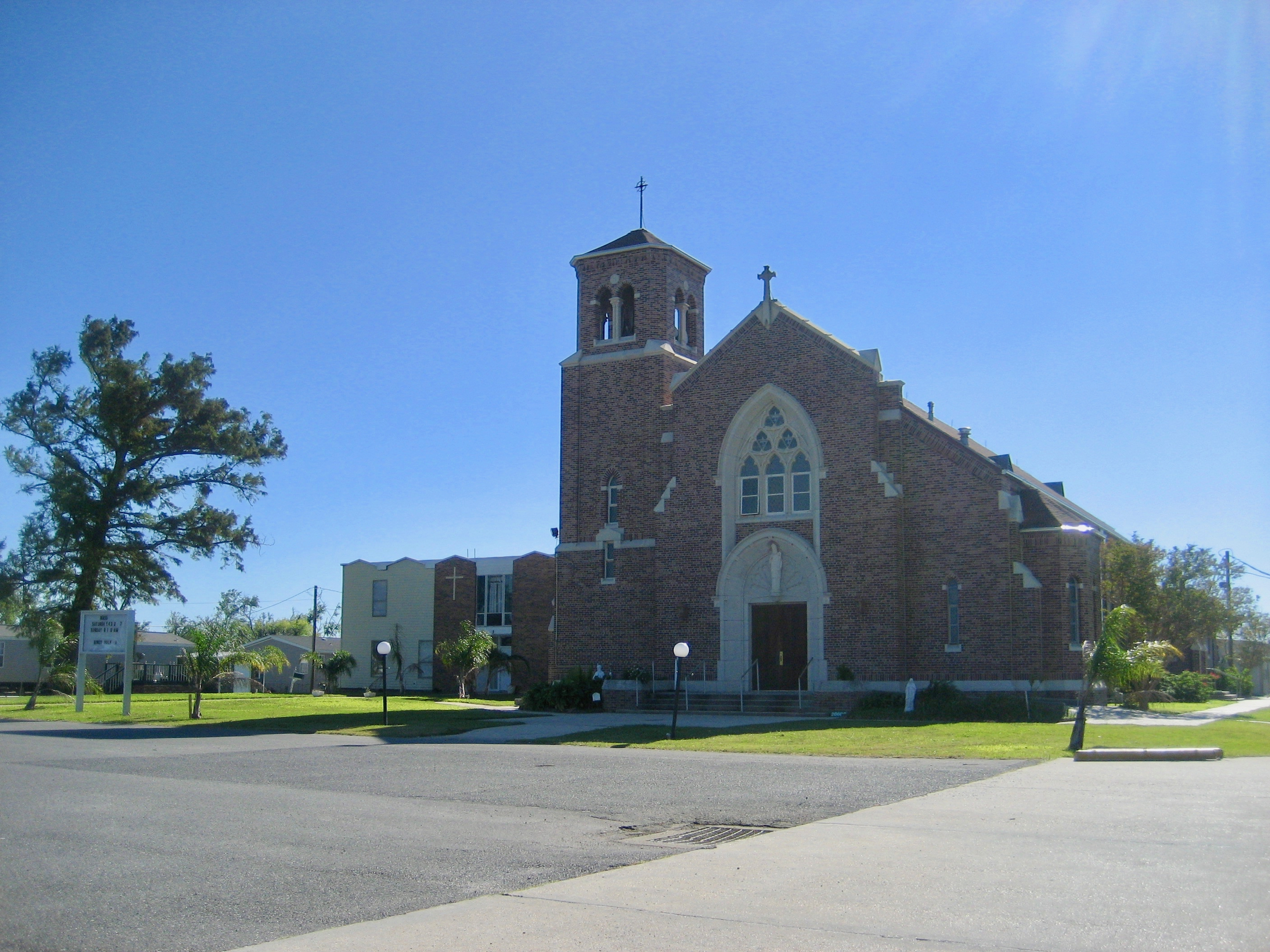
St. Patrick's current church in November 2008

The current St. Patrick's Catholic Church is a masonry structure built in 1954 to replace the wood-frame church. It is located in front of the former site of the wood frame one.
