= Belle Chasse–Scarsdale Ferry =

Coordinates: 29.852°N 89.980°W

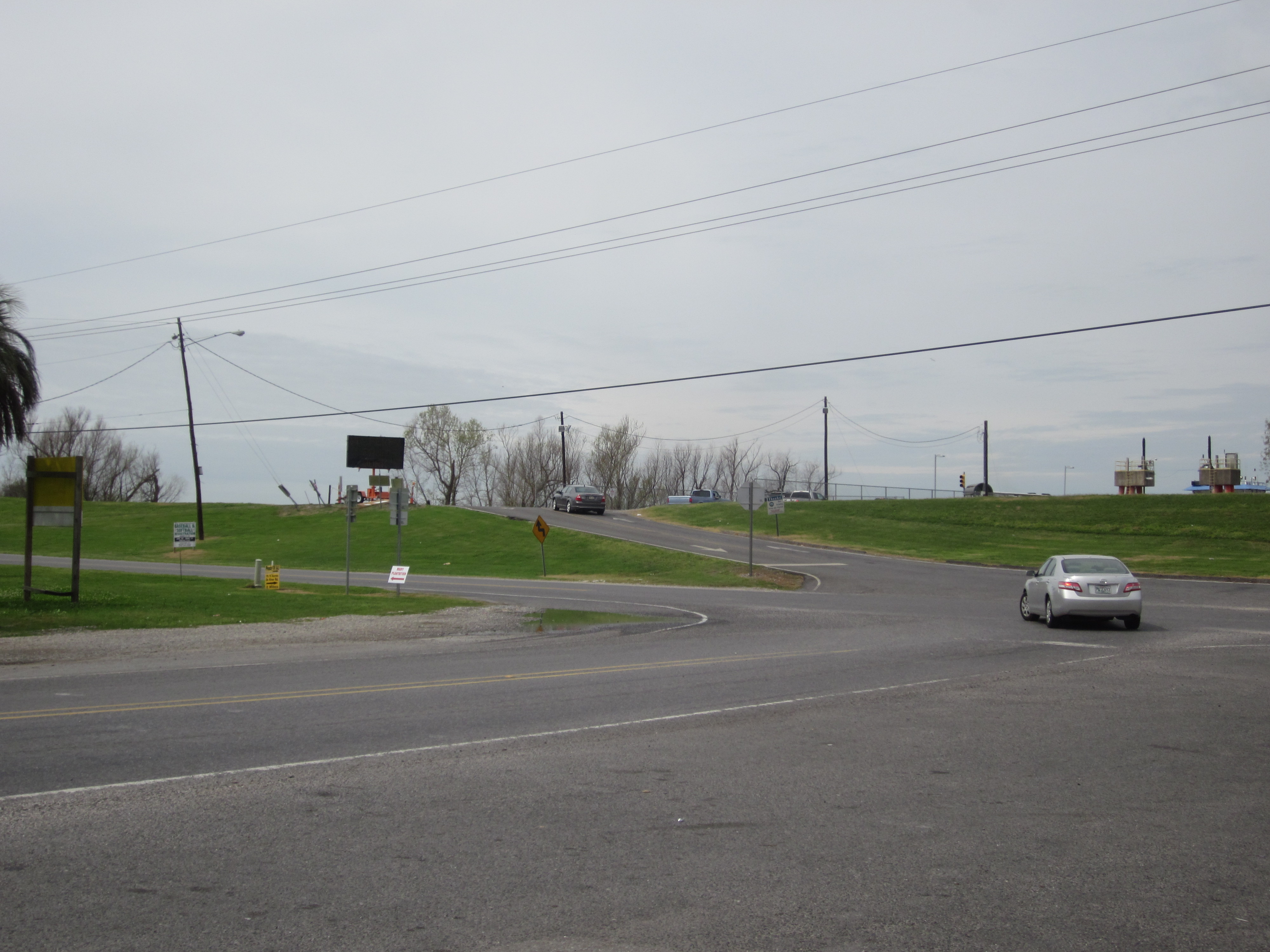
Ferry landing entrance on the Scarsdale side, 2012

The Belle Chasse–Scarsdale Ferry is a ferry across the Mississippi River in the U.S. state of Louisiana, connecting Belle Chasse and Scarsdale. The ferry is operated by the Louisiana Gateway Port. The agency also operates the Pointe à la Hache Ferry.

It carries a $1 toll for 2-axle vehicles, $2 for vehicles with at least 3 axles, and $.50 for motorcycles. The eastbank ferry leaves every 15 and 45 minutes on the hour between 5:15 AM and 10:15 PM; the westbank ferry leaves on the top and bottom of every hour between 5:00 AM and 10:00 PM.

== History ==
The ferry opened in August 1959 and was originally free.

With the closing of the Pointe à la Hache Ferry in January 2013, the Belle Chasse–Scarsdale Ferry briefly became the furthest downriver vehicle crossing of the Mississippi River. In May 2013, the Pointe à la Hache Ferry was reopened for light traffic, leaving the Belle Chasse–Scarsdale Ferry the furthest downriver crossing for large trucks and buses.

== See also ==
- List of crossings of the Lower Mississippi River
