= Mary Plantation House =

Historic house in Louisiana, United States

- U.S. National Register of Historic Places
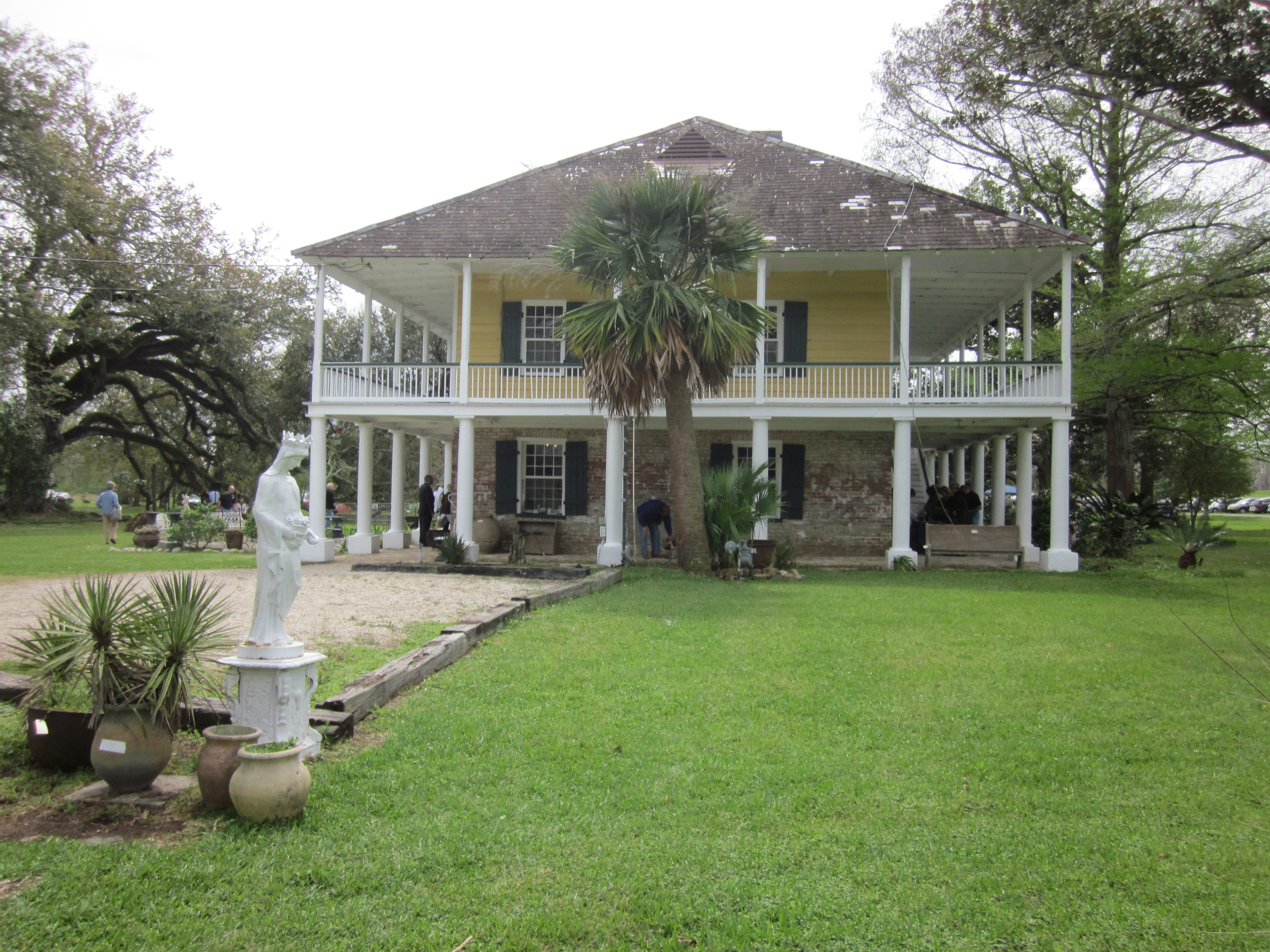

- Location within Louisiana Location within the United States
- Nearest city: Braithwaite, Louisiana
- Coordinates: 29°48′15″N 89°59′59″W
- Area: 1.5 acres (0.61 ha)
- Built: 1795, enlarged 1820
- Architectural style: French Colonial
- NRHP reference No.: 83000533
- Added to NRHP: July 13, 1983

Mary Plantation House is located on the Mary Plantation, downriver from Braithwaite, in Plaquemines Parish, Louisiana. It was begun in 1795 and expanded to its current form in 1820. The house's architectural style is French Creole.

== History ==
Situated on the east bank of the Mississippi River, the building is the oldest house in Plaquemines Parish. Although the early history of the location is uncertain, according to one architectural historian a house was built on the site in about 1795. It was significantly enlarged in the 1820s, and it went through a number of owners.

Eric Knobloch, a Tulane University botanist, and his wife bought the property in 1946, restored it, and opened it for tours. The plantation house was added to the National Register of Historic Places on July 13, 1983. After the Knobloch couple's deaths, their heirs sold the house in 2003.

The Mary Plantation House was put up for auction in 2012 and sold for $770,000 (~$1.04 million in 2024).

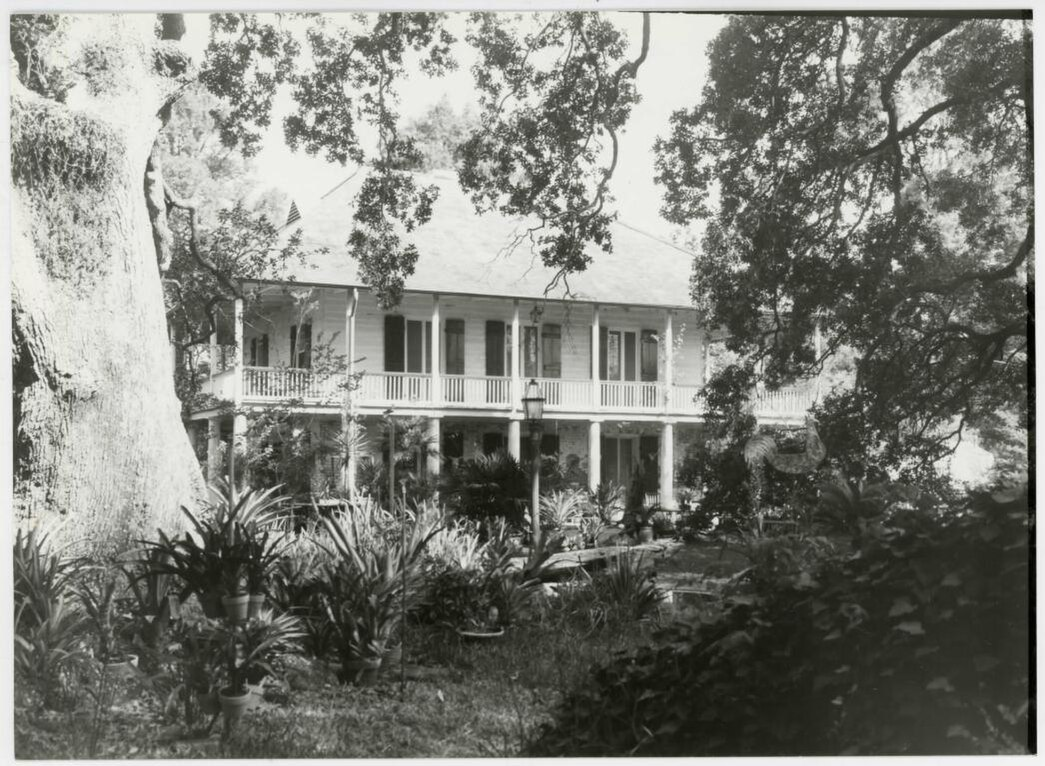
Mary Plantation House East Elevation

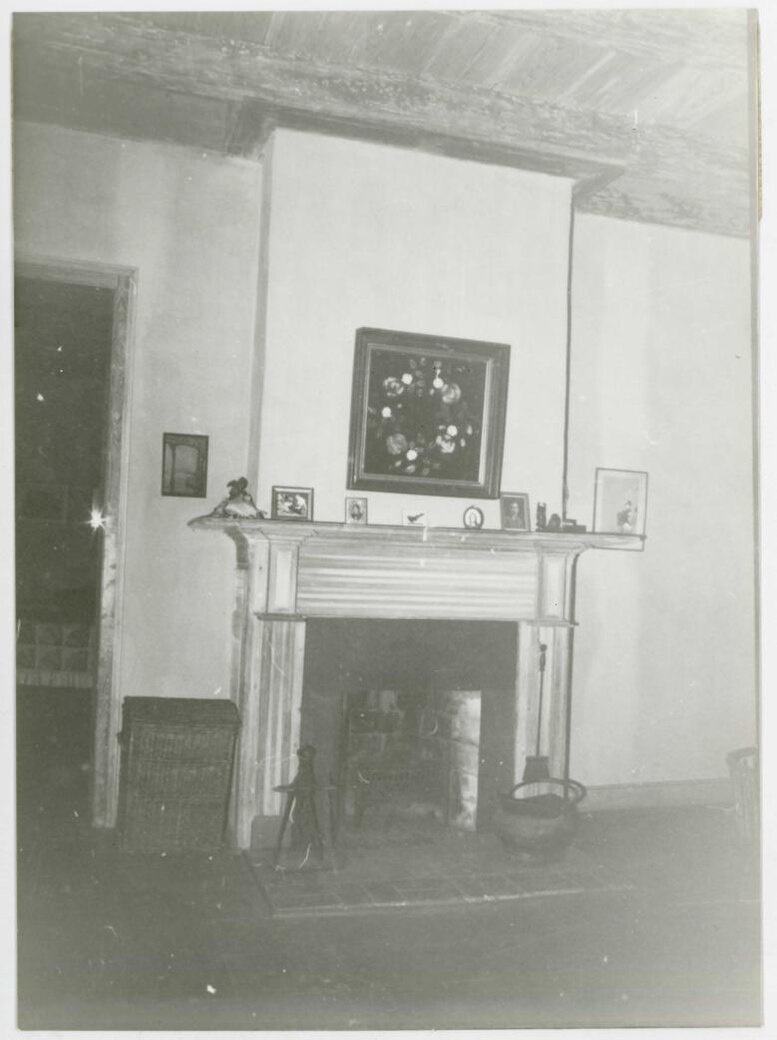
Mary Plantation House Interior Fireplace

== See also ==
- List of plantations in Louisiana
- National Register of Historic Places listings in Plaquemines Parish, Louisiana
