= Southern Comfort =

American whiskey liqueur

- Southern Comfort
- Type: Liqueur
- Manufacturer: Sazerac Company
- Origin: United States
- Introduced: 1874
- Proof (US): 100, 80, 70, 60, 42
- Website: southerncomfort.com

Southern Comfort (often abbreviated SoCo) is an American naturally fruit-flavored whiskey liqueur with fruit and spice accents. The brand was created by Irish American bartender Martin Wilkes Heron in New Orleans in 1874, using whiskey as the base spirit. Whiskey was replaced by a neutral spirit under the ownership of Brown-Forman. On March 1, 2016, the Sazerac Company purchased it, and reintroduced whiskey as its base spirit. Southern Comfort also has a line of alcohol free Eggnog.

== History ==
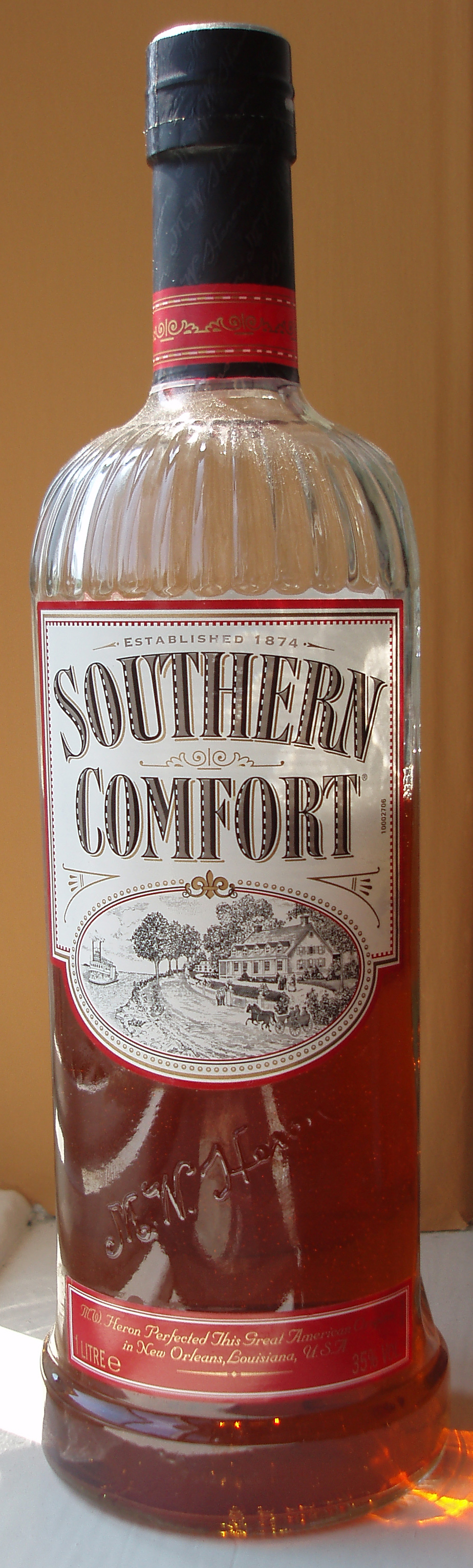
A pre-2010 Southern Comfort bottle with its label showing an illustration of Louisiana's Woodland Plantation. The label was redesigned in 2010.

Southern Comfort was created by Irish American bartender Martin Wilkes Heron (1850–1920), the son of a boat-builder, in 1874 at McCauley's Tavern in the Lower Garden District, two miles (3 km) south of the French Quarter of New Orleans, Louisiana. According to the New Orleans Convention & Visitors Bureau, McCauley's Tavern was "just off Bourbon Street", and the original form of the drink was called Cuffs and Buttons.

Heron moved to Memphis, Tennessee in 1889, patented his creation, and began selling it in sealed bottles with the slogan "None Genuine But Mine" and "Two per customer. No Gentleman would ask for more." Southern Comfort won the gold medal at the 1904 World's Fair in St. Louis, Missouri.

In an episode of The Thirsty Traveler entitled "A River of Whiskey", spirits historian Chris Morris describes the original recipe of Southern Comfort. Heron began with good-quality bourbon and would add:

An inch [2.5 cm] of vanilla bean, about a quarter of a lemon, half of a cinnamon stick, four cloves, a few cherries, and an orange bit or two. He would let this soak for days. And right when he was ready to finish, he would add his sweetener: he liked to use honey.

The original brand closed during Prohibition and was reopened afterward by Francis Fowler.

Between the 1930s and 2010, the image on the label of Southern Comfort was A Home on the Mississippi (1871), a rendering by Alfred Waud depicting Woodland Plantation, an antebellum mansion in West Pointe à la Hache, Louisiana, which is listed on the National Register of Historic Places, and now provides bed and breakfast accommodation. In 2010 the plantation artwork was dropped from the label.

Brown-Forman purchased the brand in 1979. In 2011, the brand began releasing flavored variations like cherry, lime, gingerbread, and Tabasco. In January 2016 Brown-Forman sold Southern Comfort to Sazerac Company, along with Tuaca, as part of a $543.5 million deal. Since March 1, 2016, the brand has been owned by Sazerac. Sazerac announced that Southern Comfort's formula would be changed in 2017 to restore whiskey spirit as the base spirit, as the original formula used. Sometime before Brown-Forman purchased the brand, it had been reformulated to use rectified spirit, with only a negligible amount of whiskey as a flavorant. The 2017 relaunch combined the recipe change with updated packaging and branding linked to the product’s New Orleans origins. Trade coverage reported that the reformulated version could reach shelves in summer 2017. The relaunch also introduced a new 80 Proof Black Label expression alongside the existing 70 Proof and 100 Proof bottlings. To take advantage of the rising popularity of bourbon, Southern Comfort Black was introduced in early 2018 (with a slogan of "Smoky Spiced Smooth"), along with a ready-to-drink (RTD) product of "Comfort and Cola" (4-pack of 375 mL cans, 6% alcohol).

== Varieties ==
In the United States, Southern Comfort is available as 42 U.S. proof (21% ABV), 70 U.S. proof (35% ABV), 80 U.S. proof (40% ABV), 100 U.S. proof (50% ABV), and in Australia it is 60 U.S. proof (30% ABV). Varieties including additional flavorings, such as lime and caramel, were introduced by Brown-Forman in the latter years of their ownership, but were discontinued by Sazerac.

== Eggnog products ==
Also seasonally available is Southern Comfort-branded eggnog. These currently include two variations of eggnog flavors, Traditional and Vanilla Spice. The Traditional flavor is usually available in one US qt (0.95 L) and one-half US gallon (1.9 L) sizes. These eggnog products contain no alcohol.

Previously, there were also ground coffees available with both of these eggnog flavorings, but the coffee products have since been discontinued.

== In cocktails ==
Southern Comfort is used in the creation of numerous cocktails, including the Alabama slammer.

One of the earliest Southern Comfort-based cocktails to be marketed was the Scarlett O'Hara, named after the character and concocted in tribute to the release of the film adaptation of Gone with the Wind in 1939. The mixture includes Southern Comfort, cranberry juice, and fresh lime.

American rock band Brand New included a song titled "Soco Amaretto Lime" as the closing track on their debut studio album Your Favorite Weapon (2001). The recipe has become a common specialty cocktail during Emo Nights at dance clubs.
