= Dalcour, Louisiana =

Dalcour
- Unincorporated community
- Location of Dalcour in Louisiana Dalcour (the United States)
- Coordinates: 29°48′27″N 89°59′55″W
- Country: United States
- State: Louisiana
- Parish: Plaquemines
- Elevation: 7 ft (2.1 m)
- Time zone: UTC-6 (CST)
  - Summer (DST): UTC-5 (CDT)

Dalcour is an unincorporated community in Plaquemines Parish, Louisiana, United States.

== Notable person ==
- Leander Perez (1891-1969), politician and judge, was born in Dalcour.
