= Paul du Ru =

French Jesuit priest

Father Paul Du Ru was a Jesuit priest who was active during the 1700s in the greater Mississippi area. Du Ru was born in Vernon, France, in the region of Normandy. He entered the novitiate when he was twenty; after he completed his courses, he was ordained in 1698.

== Expedition to Louisiana ==
Father Paul du Ru (1688) was a member of the Society of Jesus who was brought in by d'Iberville after he was dissatisfied with the refusal of the first Missionary Anastase Douay to stay in Fort Maurpees.

Looking further into what Father Du Ru was doing in the 1700s in the greater Louisiana and Mississippi area in this time period, he was in contact with the local indigenous tribes such as the Houma. The Houma were living on the east side of the Mississippi River twenty miles above the Red River. During his time with them, he would encourage them to build a church that is fifty feet in length and place it in front of a cross at forty feet in height. This would lead to other missionaries such as chanting the first high mass with the Houma.

He also visited the Bayogoulas and the Natchez as well. While observing these tribes and trying to introduce them to Christianity, he tried to explain that the great spirit he spoke of did not require a sacrifice. This misunderstanding came from watching these tribes' rituals and believing they resulted in death, which they did not. Du Ru would communicate with these tribes the elements of Christianity with the fragments of their language and using the lure of presents. He would begin to study these languages in order to have a clearer way of communicating with these tribesmen.

While there, Du Ru also took his time in observing the local flora and fauna, specifically putting in his journal that "The parrots here by the thousands; their plumage is marvelous, but they are far from being as good [to eat] as they are beautiful."
