= Alabama slammer =

Cocktail of amaretto, Southern Comfort, sloe gin and orange juice

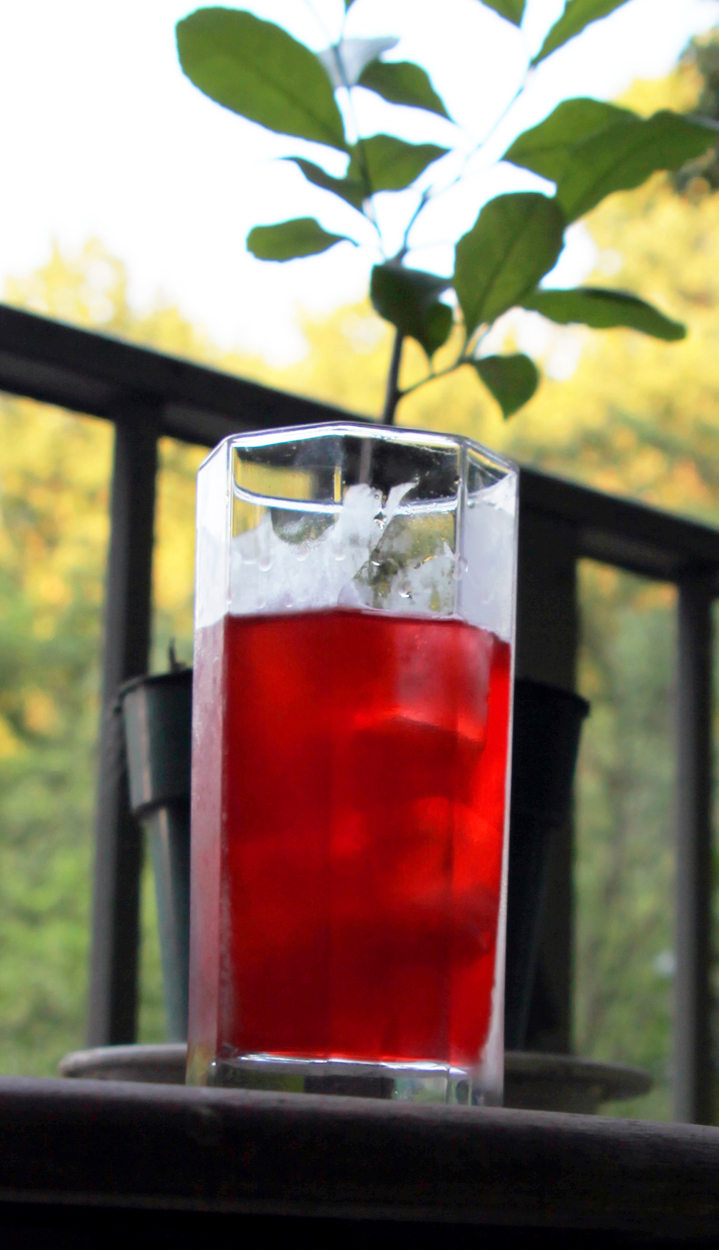
- Type: Cocktail
- Ingredients: ½ oz. Amaretto; ½ oz. Southern Comfort; ½ oz. Sloe Gin; fill with orange juice
- Standard drinkware: Collins glass
- Served: On the rocks: poured over ice

An Alabama slammer is a cocktail made with amaretto, Southern Comfort, sloe gin, and orange juice. It is served in a Collins glass. It is also sometimes known as a southern slammer. It is claimed to have been made famous by quarterback Brett Favre; however, this drink was popular with college crowds as early as the 1980s, when it was served as a shaker shot in many bars and was also available by the pitcher in T.G.I. Friday's and other chain restaurants.

== See also ==
- List of cocktails
