= West Pointe à la Hache, Louisiana =

Unincorporated community in Louisiana, U.S.

Coordinates: 29°34′10″N 89°48′02″W

West Pointe à la Hache is an unincorporated community in Plaquemines Parish, Louisiana, United States.

The community, which stands on Louisiana Highway 23, is on the southwest bank of the Mississippi River with Pointe à la Hache directly across the river to the northeast, to which it is connected by the Pointe à la Hache Ferry.

Woodland Plantation, which has been depicted on the label of Southern Comfort since the 1930s, is an antebellum mansion in the community. It is listed in the National Register of Historic Places (NHRP).

Its St. Patrick's Catholic Church, now called Spirits Hall, is also listed in the NHRP.
