= Phoenix, Louisiana =

Unincorporated community in Louisiana, U.S.

Coordinates: 29°38′46″N 89°56′23″W

Phoenix is an unincorporated community in Plaquemines Parish, Louisiana, United States.

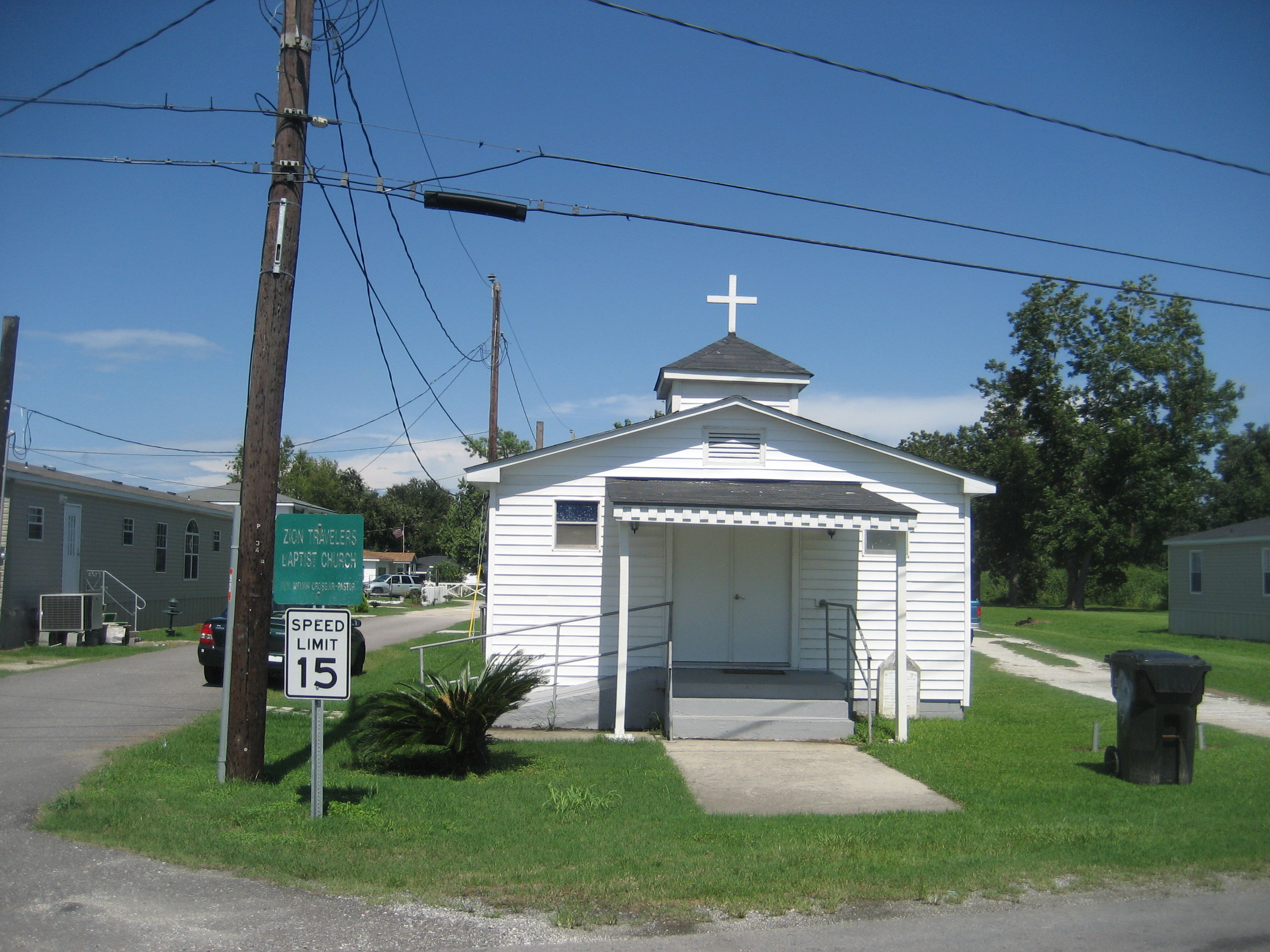
Zion Travelers Baptist Church, Phoenix

Phoenix is located on the east bank of the Mississippi River on Louisiana Highway 39, on the opposite side of the River from Myrtle Grove. It is the closest town to Fort De La Boulaye Site, a National Historic Landmark.

== Education ==
Plaquemines Parish School Board operates public schools. Phoenix High School in Phoenix serves grades K-12.
