= Braithwaite, Louisiana =

- Unincorporated community
- Location within Louisiana Location within the United States
- Coordinates: 29°51′59″N 89°56′37″W
- Country: United States
- State: Louisiana
- Parish: Plaquemines
- Elevation: 7 ft (2.1 m)
- Time zone: UTC-6 (Central (CST))
  - Summer (DST): UTC-5 (CDT)
- ZIP code: 70040
- Area code: 504
- GNIS feature ID: 533365

Braithwaite is an unincorporated community in Plaquemines Parish, Louisiana, United States. Braithwaite is located on the Mississippi River and Louisiana Highway 39 in northern Plaquemines Parish, 9.6 miles (15.4 km) southeast of New Orleans. Braithwaite has a post office operating under ZIP code 70040, which opened on September 19, 1902. Notably, two of the first recorded deaths in the United States caused by Hurricane Isaac occurred in Braithwaite, where a couple drowned in their home on August 30, 2012.

== Government ==
The United States Postal Service operates a post office.

== Education ==
The Plaquemines Parish School Board operates public schools serving the community. Phoenix High School, which provides K-12 education, is located in Braithwaite.

== See also ==
- Mary Plantation House
- Orange Grove Plantation House
- Promised Land
