= Pointe à la Hache, Louisiana =

Census-designated place in Louisiana, United States

Pointe à la Hache
- Census-designated place Unincorporated community
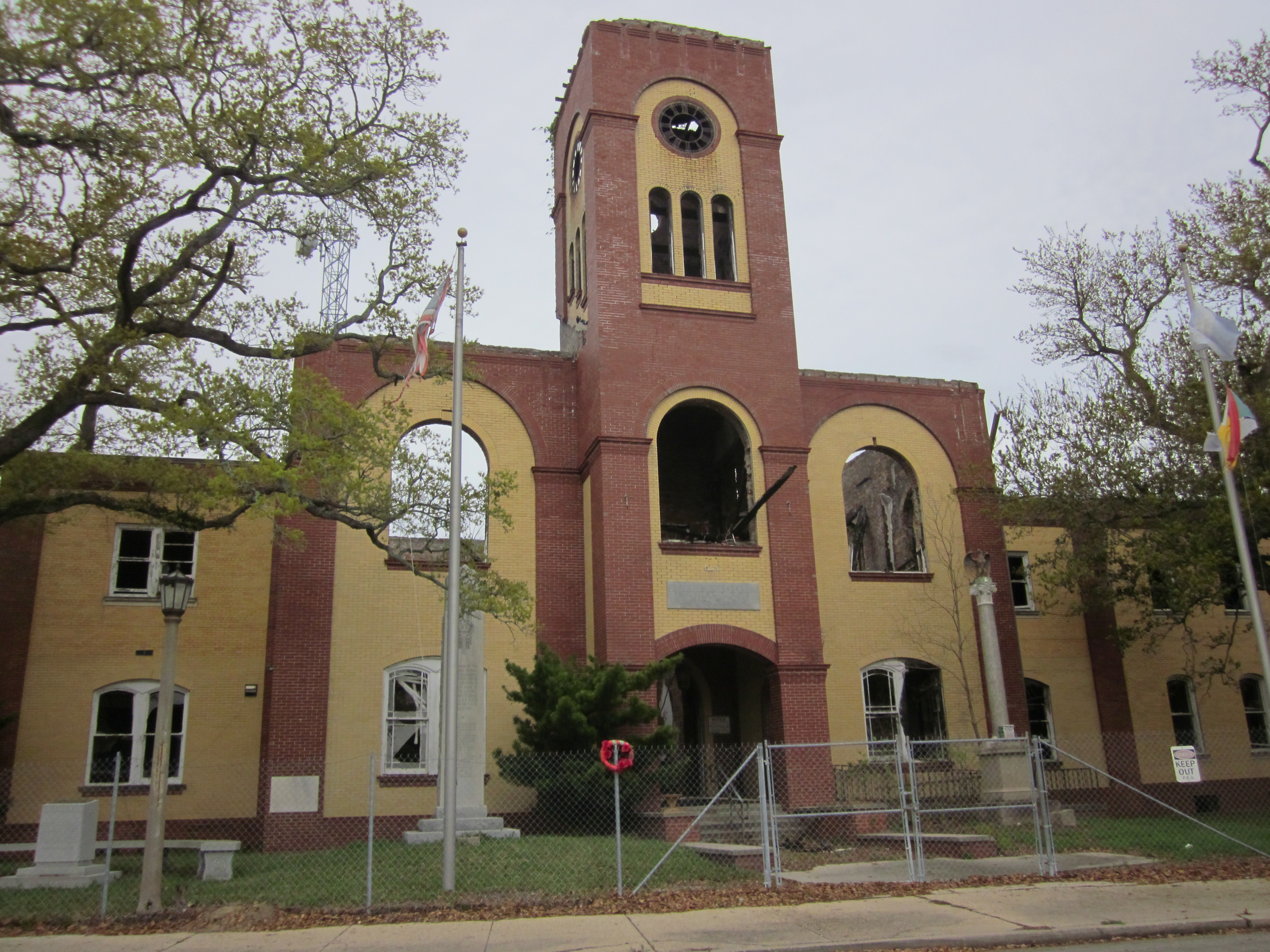
- Ruined Parish Courthouse in 2012

- Location of Pointe a la Hache in Louisiana
- Coordinates: 29°34′35″N 89°47′30″W
- Country: United States
- State: Louisiana
- Parish: Plaquemines

Area
  - Total: 1.76 sq mi (4.56 km^{2})
  - Land: 1.76 sq mi (4.56 km^{2})
  - Water: 0 sq mi (0.00 km^{2})
- Elevation: 3 ft (0.91 m)

Population (2020)
  - Total: 183
  - Density: 103.9/sq mi (40.11/km^{2})
- Time zone: UTC-6 (CST)
  - Summer (DST): UTC-5 (CDT)
- ZIP Code: 70082
- Area code: 504
- FIPS code: 22-61440

Pointe à la Hache (/ˌpɔɪnt lə ˈhæʃ/ POYNT lə HASH) is a census-designated place (CDP) and unincorporated community in Plaquemines Parish, Louisiana, United States. Located on the east bank of the Mississippi River, the village has been the seat for Plaquemines Parish since the formation of the parish. As of the 2020 census, its population was 183, less than half its 1930 population. It suffered severe damage from Hurricane Katrina in 2005 and Tropical Storm Lee in 2011.

The Pointe à la Hache Ferry, which connects to West Pointe à la Hache across the Mississippi, is the furthest downriver vehicle crossing point on the river.

== History ==
Native American settlement in the area goes back thousands of years. The earliest European settlement in the area was by the French about 1700. The name "Pointe à la Hache" is French for "axe point, or cape". In the Mitchell Map of 1755, this is marked as "Hatchet Point"

Ruins remain of the early 18th-century French installation, Fort de La Boulaye, that was built by French colonists to defend their claim of territory against the Spanish and English interests. The land there is mostly marshland, with a strip of higher land less than a mile wide between the wetlands and the Mississippi River.

Plaquemines Parish was one of the original 19 divisions of the Territory of Orleans established in 1807 after the United States acquired the territory in the Louisiana Purchase. After Louisiana achieved U.S. statehood in 1812, it was one of the original state parishes. In the 1812 Louisiana hurricane, a storm surge from the Gulf pushed all the way into the river, and there was widespread death and destruction.

The area has always been subject to seasonal hurricane damage, with some years worse than others. The 1915 New Orleans Hurricane devastated the area, breaching levees and flooding the region. Thirty-one persons died in Pointe à la Hache. The Parish Courthouse was destroyed, but some of its material was salvaged for reuse in the new Courthouse completed the same year. Pointe à la Hache once had several beautiful old homes and historic businesses, most of which have been lost to hurricane and flooding damage.

The 1930 census recorded a population of 404 in the community.

In 1943, the area was involved in a political skirmish between the infamous Leander Perez and Governor Sam Houston Jones, resulting in the 'Invasion of Point à la Hache'.

In 1965, Hurricane Betsy damaged the area, flooding the courthouse. More than 50 people rode out the storm in the courthouse. All survived.

Pointe à la Hache was the home of E. W. Gravolet, a cannery businessman. He was elected to both houses of the Louisiana State Legislature from Plaquemines Parish, serving in total from 1948 until his death in 1968.

During January 12, 2002, the parish courthouse was severely damaged by arson. Since then, the parish government has used several temporary buildings in Belle Chasse. The Plaquemines Parish Council has proposed to move the parish seat three times, but voters rejected the alternatives. Pointe à la Hache was severely damaged by Hurricane Katrina in August 2005.

On Mardi Gras Day 2011, the Mississippi River broke through its east bank about five miles below Pointe à la Hache. This breach has resulted in sediment-rich flow of the river into the wetlands, what coastal advocates have called a "cost-free" sediment diversion. Such sediment restoration in the wetlands is "a key strategy of the state's $50-billion Master Plan to reverse coastal land losses."

By 2014, this breach had been named Mardi Gras Pass by the US Coast Guard. In July 2014 LADOT requested that the US Board on Geographic Names formally name the pass. It is the first distributary to have developed in the river's delta in decades and is considered important for natural rebuilding of the wetlands. Sundown Energy wanted to close the crevasse because it hampered the company's access to oil and gas wells, but alternatives are being negotiated.

After the 2010 Gulf of Mexico Deepwater Horizon oil spill disaster, dead fish were found floating in the waterways even north of Pointe à la Hache.

As of early 2012, only a small number of people have returned to live full-time in the parish seat. West Pointe à la Hache flooded again during Tropical Storm Isaac on August 28–29, 2012.

== Demographics ==
Historical population
| Census | Pop. | Note | %± |
|---|---|---|---|
| 2010 | 187 | | — |
| 2020 | 183 | | −2.1% |
U.S. Decennial Census; 1950 1960 1970 1980; 1990 2000 2010

Pointe à la Hache first appeared as a census designated place in the 2010 U.S. census.

Pointe à la Hache CDP, Louisiana – Racial and ethnic composition Note: the US census treats Hispanic/Latino as an ethnic category. This table excludes Latinos from the racial categories and assigns them to a separate category. Hispanics/Latinos may be of any race.
| Race / Ethnicity (NH = Non-Hispanic) | Pop 2010 | Pop 2020 | % 2010 | % 2020 |
|---|---|---|---|---|
| White alone (NH) | 16 | 12 | 8.56% | 6.56% |
| Black or African American alone (NH) | 170 | 159 | 90.91% | 86.89% |
| Native American or Alaska Native alone (NH) | 1 | 0 | 0.53% | 0.00% |
| Asian alone (NH) | 0 | 0 | 0.00% | 0.00% |
| Native Hawaiian or Pacific Islander alone (NH) | 0 | 0 | 0.00% | 0.00% |
| Other race alone (NH) | 0 | 2 | 0.00% | 1.09% |
| Mixed race or Multiracial (NH) | 0 | 4 | 0.00% | 2.19% |
| Hispanic or Latino (any race) | 0 | 6 | 0.00% | 3.28% |
| Total | 187 | 183 | 100.00% | 100.00% |

As of 2020, the community had a population of 183.

== Government and infrastructure ==
The United States Postal Service operates a post office.

== Education ==
Plaquemines Parish School Board operates the public schools of the parish.
