= Leander Perez =

American judge

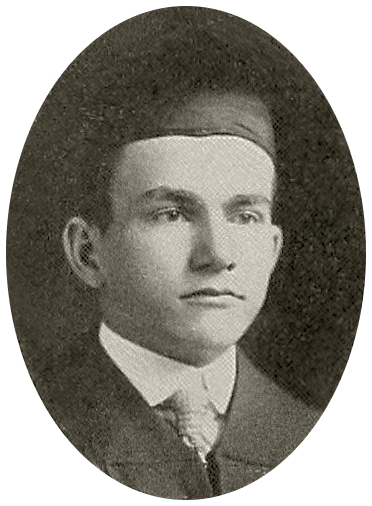
- Perez in 1914 as Tulane Law School graduate

District Attorney of Plaquemines Parish, Louisiana
- In office 1924–1969

Personal details
- Born: July 16, 1891 Dalcour, Louisiana, U.S.
- Died: March 19, 1969 (aged 77) Plaquemines Parish, Louisiana, U.S.
- Party: Democratic
- Other political affiliations: States' Rights (1948); American Independent (1968)
- Spouse: Agnes Octave Perez
- Relations: Leander H. Perez, III (grandson who was a son-in-law of State Representative Edward S. Bopp)
- Children: 4
- Profession: District judge, district attorney, and president of the Plaquemines Parish Commission Council

Leander Henry Perez Sr. (July 16, 1891 – March 19, 1969) was an American Democratic Party political boss of Plaquemines and St. Bernard parishes in southeastern Louisiana during the middle third of the 20th century. Officially, he served as a district judge, later as district attorney, and as president of the Plaquemines Parish Commission Council. He was known for leading efforts to enforce and preserve segregation.

== Early life and education ==
Perez was born in the community of Dalcour, on the east bank of Plaquemines Parish, to Roselius E. "Fice" Perez (died 1939) and the former Gertrude Solis (died 1944). The Perez and Solis families were Isleños, an ethnic community descended from settlers from the Canary Islands, Spain. Perez attended Holy Cross School in New Orleans for his secondary education but he did not graduate from the school. He later enrolled at Louisiana State University in Baton Rouge as a subfreshman and graduated from the university in 1912. In the fall of 1912, Perez was admitted to Tulane University Law School in New Orleans and after graduating in 1914, he began his law practice in New Orleans and in Plaquemines Parish.

== Political career ==
In 1919, Judge Perez launched a reign of bought elections and strictly enforced segregation by ensuring laws were enacted on his fiat and rubber-stamped by the parish governing councils. Elections under Perez's reign were sometimes blatantly falsified, with voting records appearing in alphabetical order and names of national celebrities such as Babe Ruth, Charlie Chaplin, and Herbert Hoover appearing on the rolls. Perez-endorsed candidates often won with 90% or more of the ballots. Those who appeared to vote were intimidated by Perez's enforcers. He sent large tough men into the voting booths to "help" people vote. Many voters were bribed. Perez testified that he bribed voters $2, $5, and $10 to vote his way, depending on who they were.

Perez took action to suppress African Americans from voting within his domain, but most were already disenfranchised due to the state constitution passed at the turn of the century, which added requirements for payment of poll taxes and passing literacy tests in order to register to vote. Subjective and discriminatory treatment by white registrars prevented most blacks from registering.

Despite his conservative views, Perez became closely allied with left-wing governor Huey Long, and served as Long's defense attorney at his 1929 impeachment trial.

== Segregationist ==
In the 1950s and 1960s, Perez gained attention as a nationally prominent opponent of desegregation, taking a leadership role in the southern Massive Resistance to change, particularly following the 1954 U.S. Supreme Court decision in Brown v. Board of Education, which ruled that segregation of public schools was unconstitutional. Perez helped organize the White Citizens' Councils, white supremacist "front organizations for the Ku Klux Klan", among them the Citizens' Council of Greater New Orleans. Perez researched and wrote much of the legislation sponsored by Louisiana's Joint Legislative Committee on Segregation.

His legislative ally, E. W. Gravolet of Pointe à la Hache, tried without success to pass grants-in-aid bills to provide state assistance to private schools that were founded to avoid desegregation, known as segregation academies.

== Excommunication ==
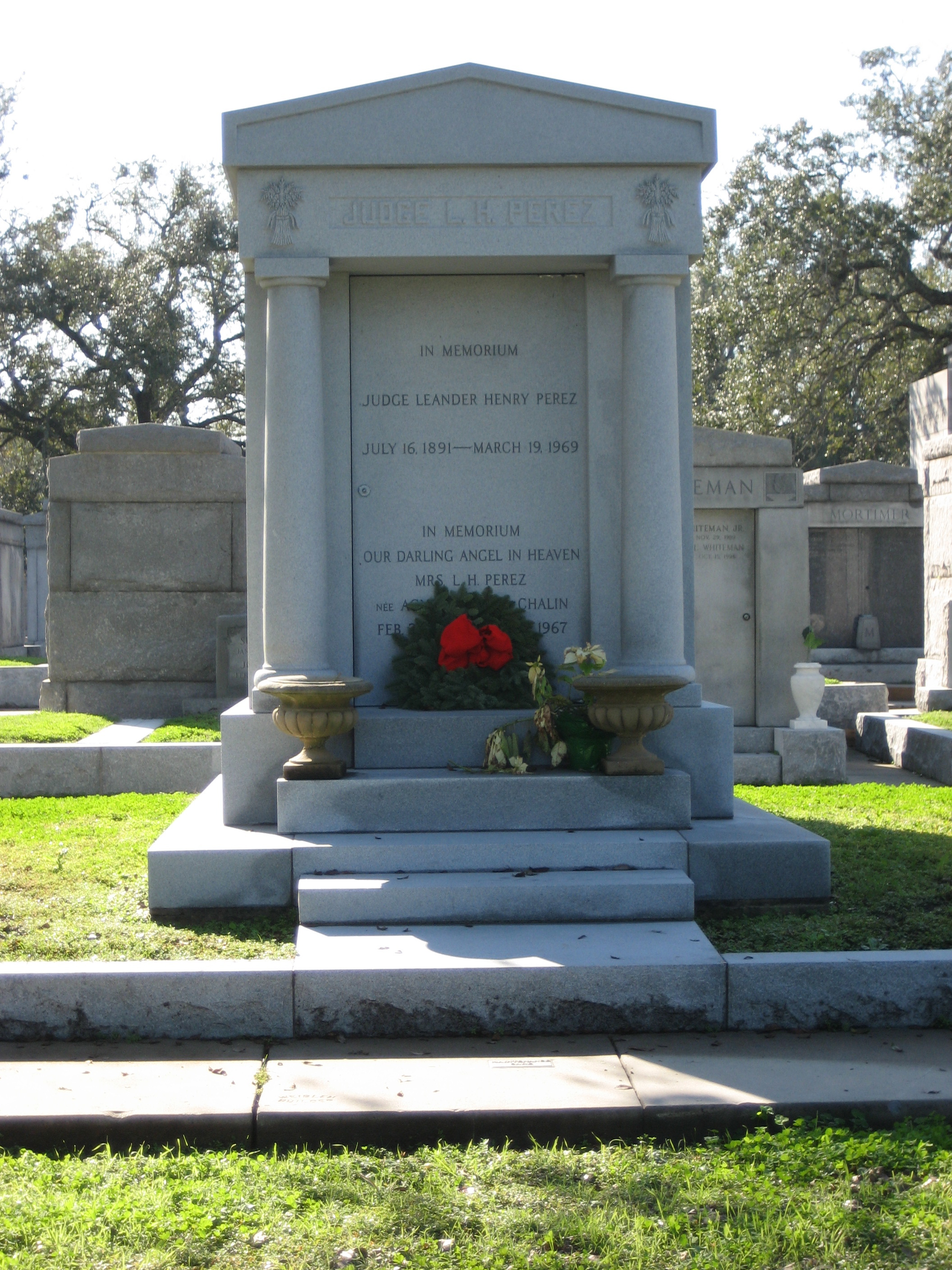
Leander Perez's tomb, in Metairie Cemetery, New Orleans

In 1962, the Archdiocese of New Orleans announced its plan to desegregate the New Orleans parochial school system for the 1962–1963 school year. Perez led a movement to pressure businesses into firing any whites who allowed their children to attend the newly desegregated Catholic schools. Catholics in St. Bernard Parish boycotted one school, which the archdiocese kept open without students for four months; it burned down in what was suspected as arson. In response, Archbishop Rummel excommunicated Perez and two other opponents of integration on April 16, 1962.

Perez described himself at one point as "a Catholic, but not an Archbishop's Catholic." He eventually reconciled with the Catholic Church and was readmitted before his death after issuing a retraction, and through political leverage exercised by Democratic senator James Eastland. Perez received a requiem Mass at Holy Name of Jesus Christ Church at Loyola University in New Orleans.

== Personal life ==
In 1917, Perez married Agnes Octave Chalin. They had four children; two sons and two daughters.

== Legacy ==
- "What Color Are You", a 1966 folk song by Bob Lind, was written "to [Perez] and people like him", criticizing Perez's segregationist ideology.
- In 1970, Judge Perez Drive, a major thoroughfare in St. Bernard Parish, was named after him (it was formerly Goodchildren Drive). In 1999, the road was rededicated with the same name as an honor for the late Melvyn Perez, a long-time judge in St. Bernard Parish. (In 1978, nine years after Leander Perez's death, the Louisiana legislature had designated St. Bernard Parish as its own judicial district. Melvyn Perez served there.)
