= Louisiana Highway 23 =

State highway in Louisiana, United States

Louisiana Highway 23

Route information
- Maintained by Louisiana DOTD
- Length: 73.6 mi (118.4 km)
- Existed: 1955 renumbering–present

Major junctions
- South end: Jump Basin Road in Venice
- LA 3017 in Belle Chasse LA 428 near Gretna US 90 Bus. / Future I-49 / LA 18 in Gretna
- North end: LA 428 in Gretna

Location
- Country: United States
- State: Louisiana
- Parishes: Plaquemines, Jefferson

Highway system
- Louisiana State Highway System; Interstate; US; State; Scenic
← LA 22	→ LA 24

Louisiana Highway 23 (LA 23) is a north–south state highway in Louisiana that serves Plaquemines and Jefferson Parishes. It spans 74.0 miles (119.1 km) in roughly a southeast to northwest direction. The section in from Gretna to Belle Chasse, Louisiana is known locally as Belle Chasse Highway; portions in Gretna are also signed as the pre-existing Lafayette Street.

== Route description ==
LA 23 connects Gretna and Venice. Between Belle Chasse and Venice, the highway serves as the main road along the west bank of the Mississippi River. In Belle Chasse, the highway crosses the Gulf Intracoastal Waterway via two antiquated crossings: southbound traffic uses the 1955-vintage Belle Chasse Tunnel, a narrow crossing that does not allow passing; northbound traffic uses the 1967-vintage Judge Perez Bridge, a vertical-lift bridge. LA 23 runs through the small rural towns of Jesuit Bend, Naomi, Myrtle Grove, West Pointe à la Hache, Port Sulphur, Nairn, Empire, Buras, Triumph, and Boothville. With the exception of the portion running through Port Sulphur, the entire highway is four lanes (although it is not controlled-access).

The highway is a critical hurricane evacuation route for thousands of inhabitants along the west bank of the Mississippi River.

== History ==
At one time, LA 23 ran straight across the Westbank Expressway (U.S. Highway 90 Business), using Lafayette Street, 5th Street and Huey P. Long Avenue through downtown Gretna and crossing the Jackson Avenue-Gretna Ferry onto Jackson Avenue in New Orleans. By 1986, it had been rerouted, running along the Westbank Expressway frontage roads to Stumpf Boulevard and turning north on Stumpf and Franklin Avenue to end at Burmaster Street (LA 428). The former LA 23 to 4th Street in downtown Gretna became an extension of LA 18, while the three blocks beyond to the ferry (and Jackson Avenue in New Orleans) are now unnumbered. Before the 1950s, LA 23 went through Terrytown via present-day Behrman Highway (LA 428).

Twinning of the highway in Plaquemines Parish was begun by Judge Perez in the 1960s. The vertical lift bridge in Belle Chasse was added in 1968, and the Empire Jetty Bridge over Dollut Canal, a high-rise bridge, opened in 1976, replacing a 26-year-old lift bridge.

In Plaquemines Parish, sections of the original LA 23, since bypassed, are signed as Parish Road 11 (although some maps erroneously list these routes as LA-11), such as in Jesuit Bend and the area south of Port Sulphur through Empire, Buras, and Fort Jackson. Prior to Louisiana's 1955 highway renumbering, LA 23 through Plaquemines Parish was LA 31, and there are some bridges, such as the Bayou Barriere crossings in northern Belle Chasse, that still bear the original numbering.

As of 2019, the portion from U.S. Highway 90 Business to LA 428 is under agreement to be removed from the state highway system and transferred to local control.

Before 2025, in Belle Chasse, the highway crossed the Gulf Intracoastal Waterway via two antiquated crossings: southbound traffic used the 1955-vintage Belle Chasse Tunnel, a narrow crossing that does not allow passing; northbound traffic used the 1967-vintage Judge Perez Bridge, a vertical-lift bridge. Both were replaced by the new tolled Belle Chasse Bridge, which opened for southbound traffic on December 20, 2023, and northbound traffic on March 17, 2025.

== Major intersections ==
Parish	Location	mi	km	Destinations	Notes
Plaquemines	Venice	0.0	0.0	Jump Basin Road	Southern terminus; Local road continues southwest towards Tidewater
Plaquemines	Empire	19.6	31.5	Bridge over Bayou Long/Doullut Canal	
Plaquemines	Belle Chasse	67.0	107.8	LA 406 (Woodland Highway)	Southern terminus of LA 406
Plaquemines	Belle Chasse	68.0	109.4	Judge Perez Bridge (northbound)/Belle Chasse Tunnel (southbound) across Gulf Intracoastal Waterway	
Plaquemines	Belle Chasse	68.4	110.1	LA 3017 (Engineers Road)	Southern terminus of LA 3017
Plaquemines	Belle Chasse	68.6	110.4	Bridge over Outfall Canal	
Jefferson		69.1	111.2	LA 428 (Behrman Highway)	Southern terminus of LA 428
Jefferson	Gretna	71.9	115.7	US 90 Bus. west (West Bank Expressway) LA 18 west (Lafayette Street)	South end of U.S. 90 Business concurrency (LA 23 uses service roads only); Exit 7 (U.S. 90 Business); Eastern terminus of LA 18; Partially unsigned junction
Jefferson	Gretna	72.6	116.8	US 90 Bus. east (West Bank Expressway) – New Orleans	North end of U.S. 90 Business concurrency (LA 23 uses service roads only); Exit 8 (U.S. 90 Business); Junction includes incorrect signage
Jefferson	Gretna	73.1	117.6	LA 466 (Kepler Street)	Eastern terminus of LA 466
Jefferson	Gretna	73.6	118.4	LA 428 (Franklin Avenue, Burmaster Street)	Northern terminus
1.000 mi = 1.609 km; 1.000 km = 0.621 mi: Concurrency terminus
