= Triumph, Louisiana =

- Census-designated place & Unincorporated community
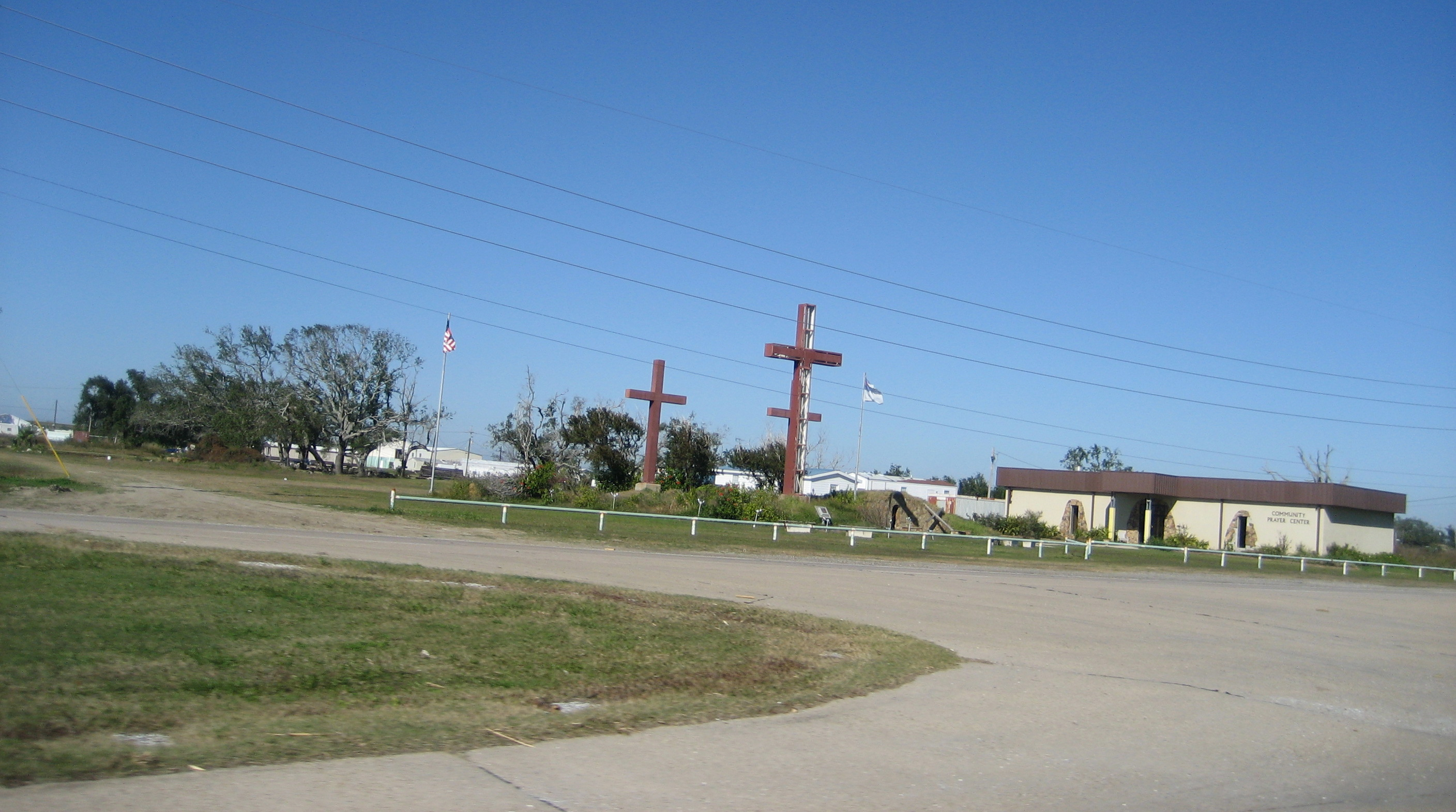
- Miracle Assembly of God Community Prayer Center, Triumph

- Location within Louisiana Location within the United States
- Coordinates: 29°20′22″N 89°28′36″W
- Country: United States
- State: Louisiana
- Parish: Plaquemines

Area
  - Total: 4.02 sq mi (10.42 km^{2})
  - Land: 2.78 sq mi (7.21 km^{2})
  - Water: 1.24 sq mi (3.21 km^{2})
- Elevation: 6.6 ft (2 m)

Population (2020)
  - Total: 268
  - Density: 96.3/sq mi (37.17/km^{2})
- Time zone: UTC-6 (Central (CST))
  - Summer (DST): UTC-5 (CDT)
- Area code: 504
- GNIS feature ID: 558335

Triumph (French: Ville de Triomphe) is an unincorporated community and census-designated place in Plaquemines Parish, Louisiana, United States. It is located on the south bank of the Mississippi River. As of the 2020 census, its population was 268.

It is the closest town to two National Historic Landmarks: Fort Jackson (down river from the town; though due to a bend in the river to the north east) and (across the river) Fort St. Philip.

The 1960 U.S Census listed Triumph as having a population of 900. Until 2010, the Census did not count Triumph as a separate community, including it as part of the census-designated place (CDP) of Buras-Triumph.

According to tradition, the community was named for its "triumph" over a rival town when they secured a post office.

Like most of Plaquemines Parish, Triumph was severely damaged by the massive storm surge from Hurricane Katrina in 2005.

== Education ==
Plaquemines Parish School Board operates the public schools of the parish.

It is served by South Plaquemines High School in Buras. Prior to 2005 Buras Middle School and Buras High School served the community, but Hurricane Katrina damaged the buildings. South Plaquemines High was built on the former Buras Middle School location.

== Demographics ==
Historical population
Census	Pop.	Note	%±
2010	216		—
2020	268		24.1%
U.S. Decennial Census

Triumph first appeared in the 2010 U.S. census formed along with the Buras CDP from the deleted Buras-Triumph CDP.

Triumph CDP, Louisiana – Racial and ethnic composition Note: the US census treats Hispanic/Latino as an ethnic category. This table excludes Latinos from the racial categories and assigns them to a separate category. Hispanics/Latinos may be of any race.
Race / Ethnicity (NH = Non-Hispanic)	Pop 2010	Pop 2020	% 2010	% 2020
White alone (NH)	135	152	62.50%	56.72%
Black or African American alone (NH)	45	47	20.83%	17.54%
Native American or Alaska Native alone (NH)	2	3	0.93%	1.12%
Asian alone (NH)	11	40	5.09%	14.93%
Native Hawaiian or Pacific Islander alone (NH)	0	0	0.00%	0.00%
Other race alone (NH)	3	3	1.39%	1.12%
Mixed race or Multiracial (NH)	11	13	5.09%	4.85%
Hispanic or Latino (any race)	9	10	4.17%	3.73%
Total	216	268	100.00%	100.00%

Triumph was split off from the Buras-Triumph CDP prior to the 2010 U.S. census. By 2020, its population was 268.
