= Fort St. Philip =

- U.S. National Register of Historic Places
- U.S. National Historic Landmark
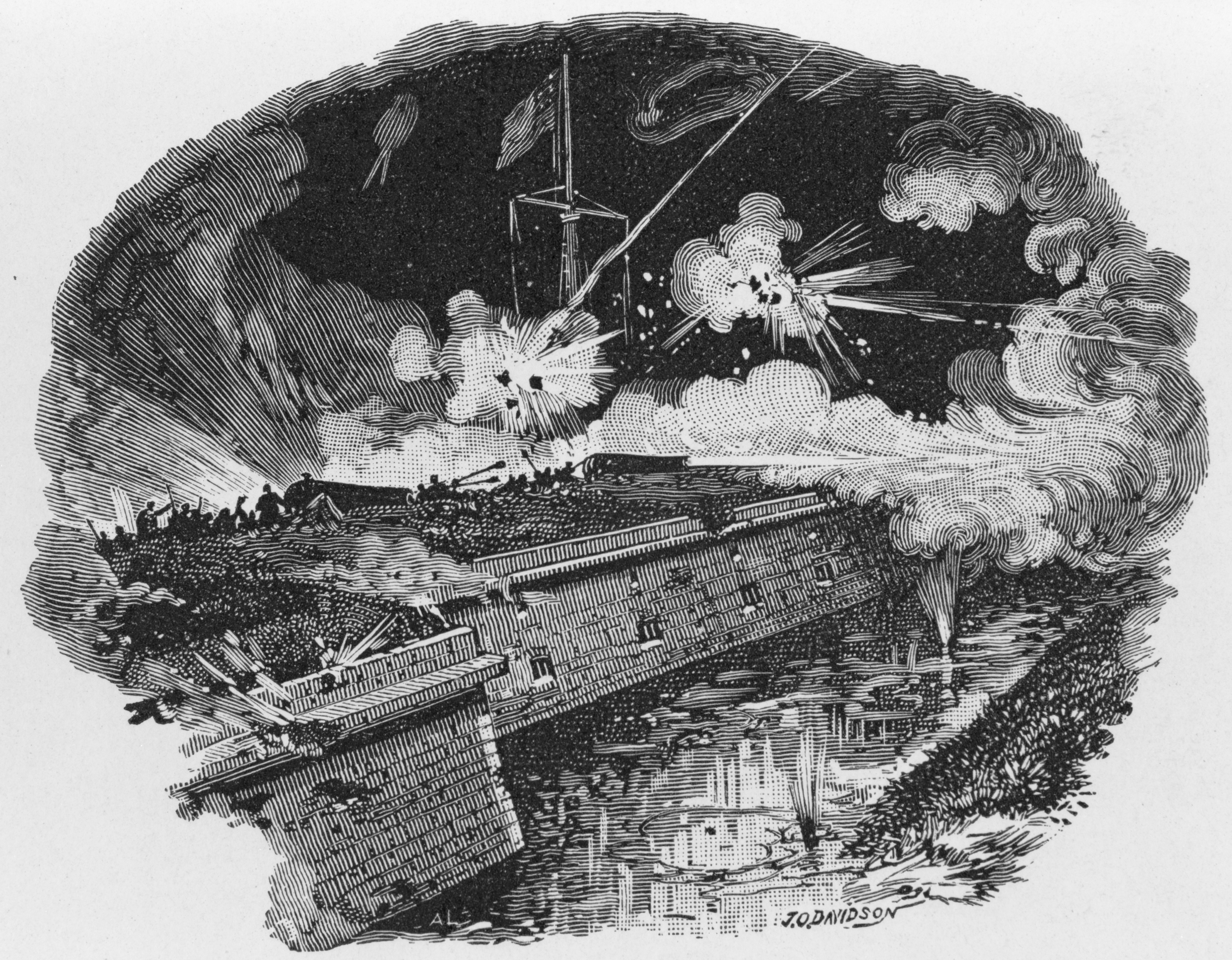
- Fort St. Philip in the U.S. Civil War

- Location within Louisiana Location within the United States
- Location: Plaquemines Parish, Louisiana, US
- Nearest city: Triumph, Louisiana
- Coordinates: 29°21′50″N 89°27′51″W
- Built: 1746
- NRHP reference No.: 66000380

Significant dates
- Added to NRHP: October 15, 1966
- Designated NHL: December 19, 1960

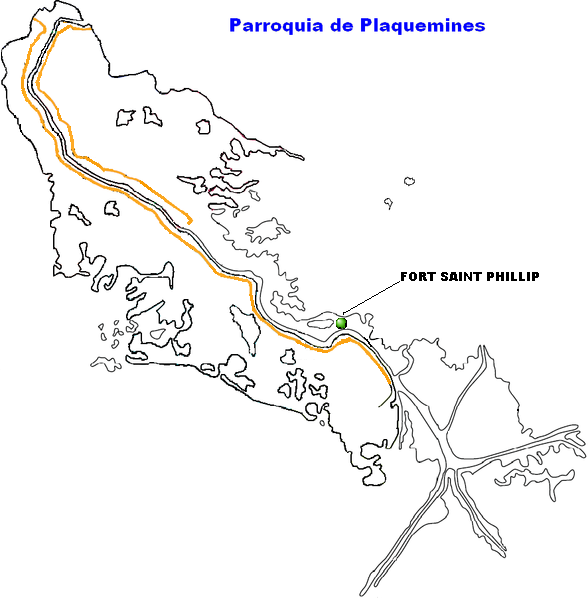
Fort St. Philip along the Mississippi River

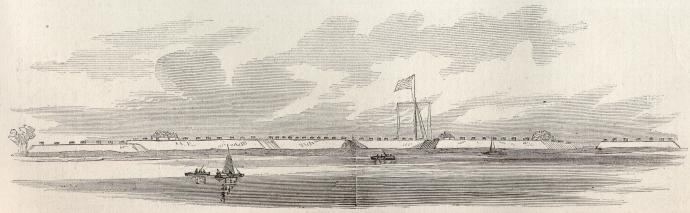
Fort St. Philip in 1862

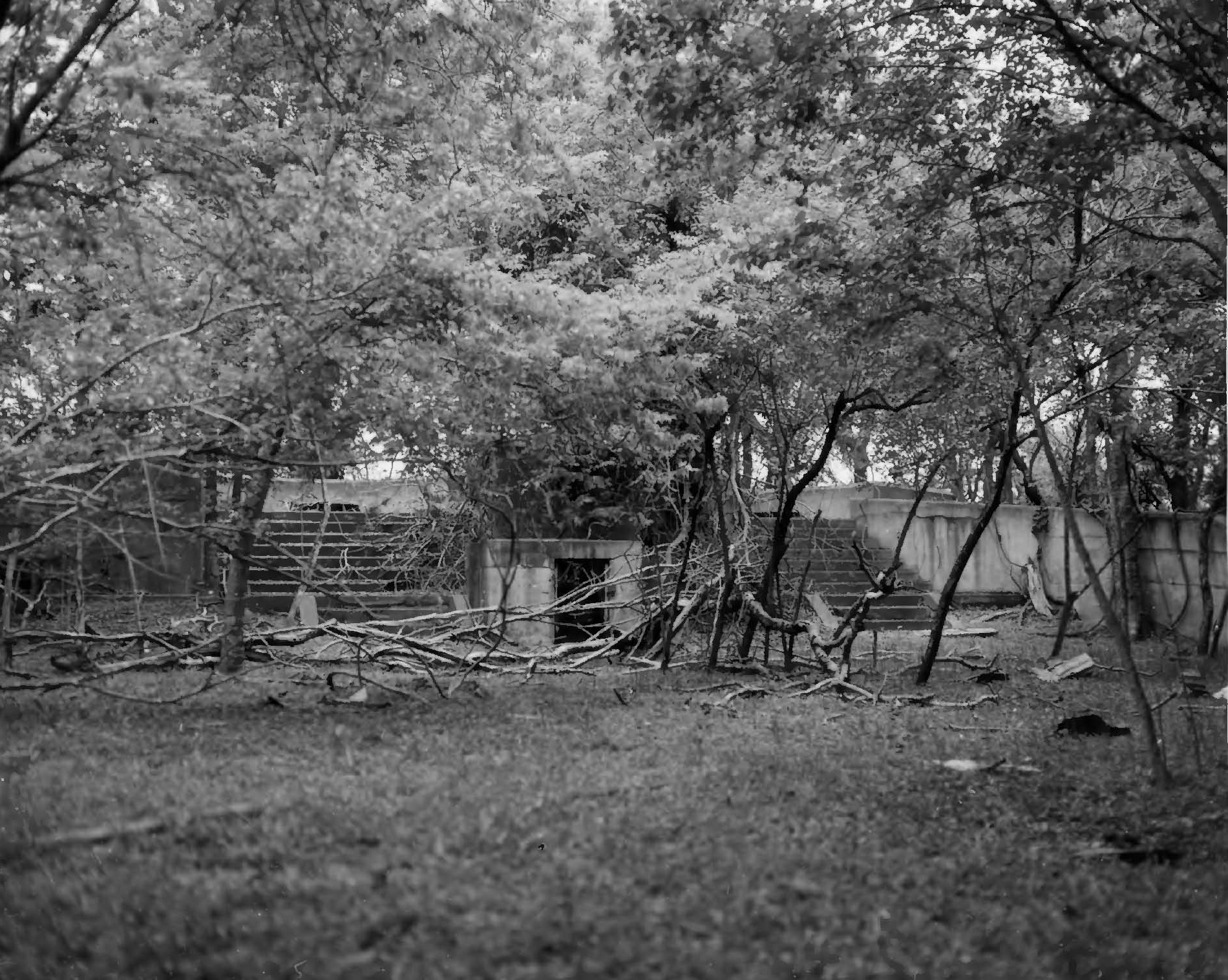
Fort St. Philip 1898

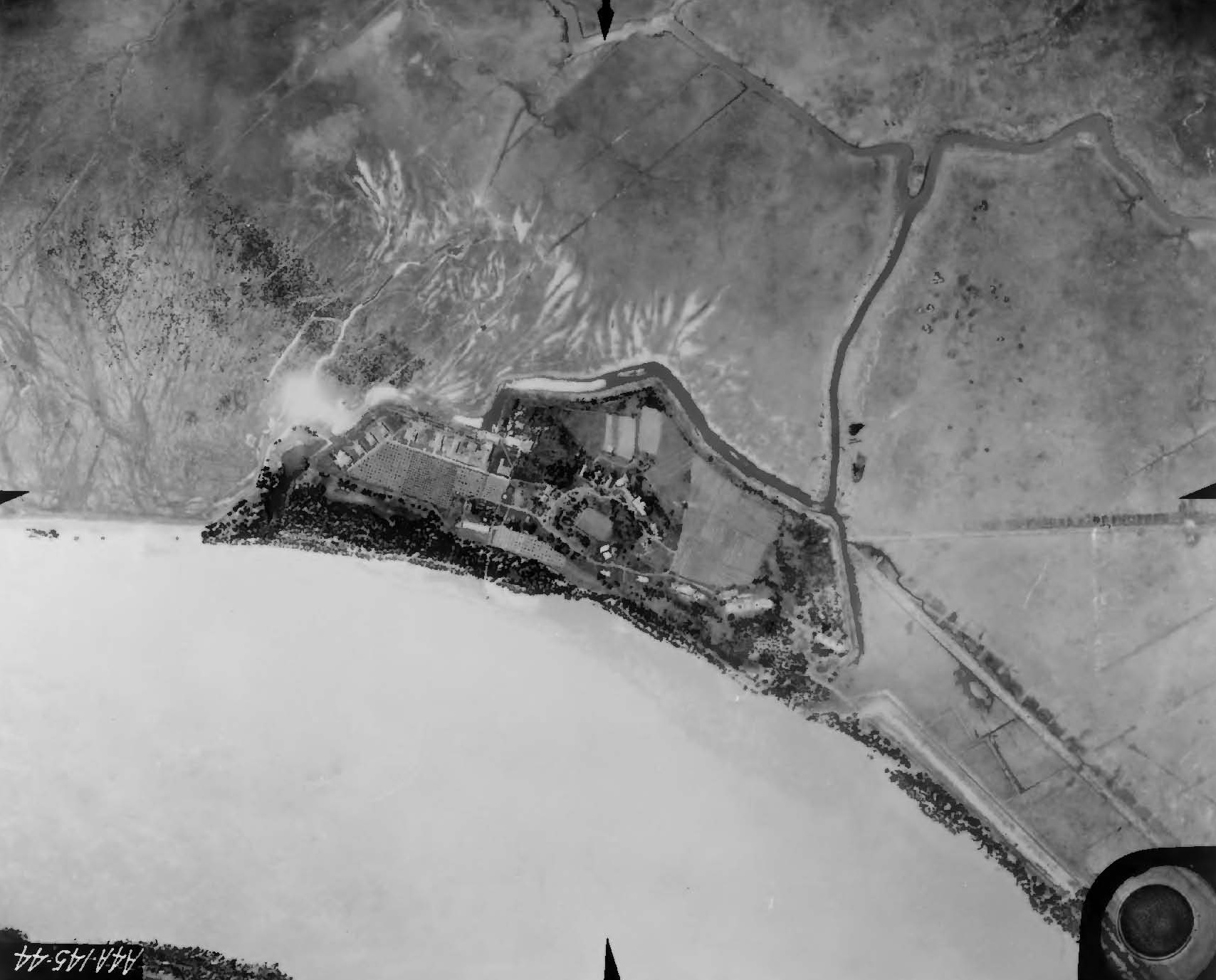
Fort St. Philip from the air in 1935.

Fort St. Philip is a historic masonry fort located on the eastern bank of the Mississippi River, about 40 miles (64 km) upriver from its mouth in Plaquemines Parish, Louisiana, just opposite Fort Jackson on the other side of the river. It formerly served as military protection of New Orleans, some 80 miles (130 km) up the river, and of the lower Mississippi River.

== History ==
The first fort on this location, Fort San Felipe, was constructed in the 18th century during the period of Spanish control of Louisiana.

During the War of 1812 the garrison of Fort St. Philip defended the river approach to New Orleans. British naval forces attacked the fort on January 9 but were unsuccessful, withdrawing after ten days of bombardment. Whilst the engagement appeared to have served no useful purpose to the British, it could be said it made a valuable contribution to the escape of Lambert's army elsewhere. In a despatch sent to the Secretary of War, dated January 19, Jackson states 'I am strengthened not only by [the defeat of the British at New Orleans]... but by the failure of his fleet to pass fort St. Philip.'

The current fort was constructed, along with Fort Jackson, as a coastal defense for New Orleans and the Mississippi, upon the urging of Andrew Jackson. It was the site of a twelve-day battle in April 1862 by Union forces during the American Civil War, which was the decisive battle in the capture of New Orleans.

It was declared a National Historic Landmark in 1960.

In the 1930s the fort was used as a tanning factory.

During the Civil Rights Movement, Leander Perez threatened to jail opponents and demonstrators against segregation at the fort and in 1964 installed barbed wire.

From 1978 through 1989 the fort complex served as the site of an intentional, nonsectarian spiritual community called Vella-Ashby, named by conjoining the surnames of the original and subsequent private property owners respectively. The community members numbered as many as 16 at any one time and were known as the Christos family. They lived in four buildings—three two-story officers quarters and an officers club—that remained from the re-fortification of the site during the 1898 Spanish–American War.

Fort St. Philip remains privately owned and in a state of bad deterioration. It was heavily damaged in 2005 during Hurricanes Katrina and Rita. According to the National Park Service, the owner reported that only the original brick fort and the concrete structures from the time of the Spanish–American War remain.

The site is accessible only by boat or helicopter, and following erosion of the small levee is now subject to flooding during high water levels of the Mississippi River.

== See also ==
- National Register of Historic Places listings in Plaquemines Parish, Louisiana
- List of National Historic Landmarks in Louisiana
- Jackson Barracks, New Orleans
- Fort de la Balize
- Fort De La Boulaye
