= General Order No. 28 =

American Civil War military decree in New Orleans

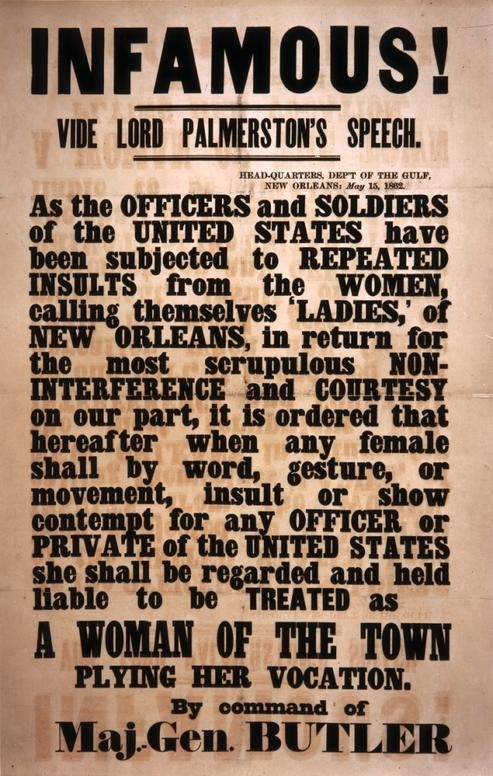
Order as a broadside

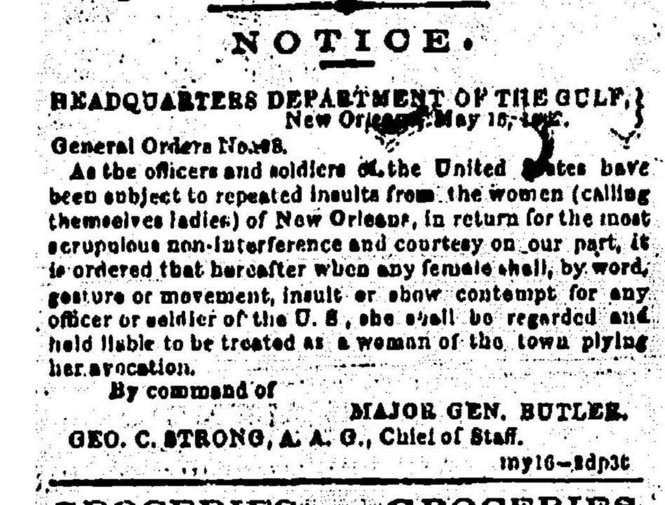
Order as printed in the Daily Picayune newspaper, New Orleans

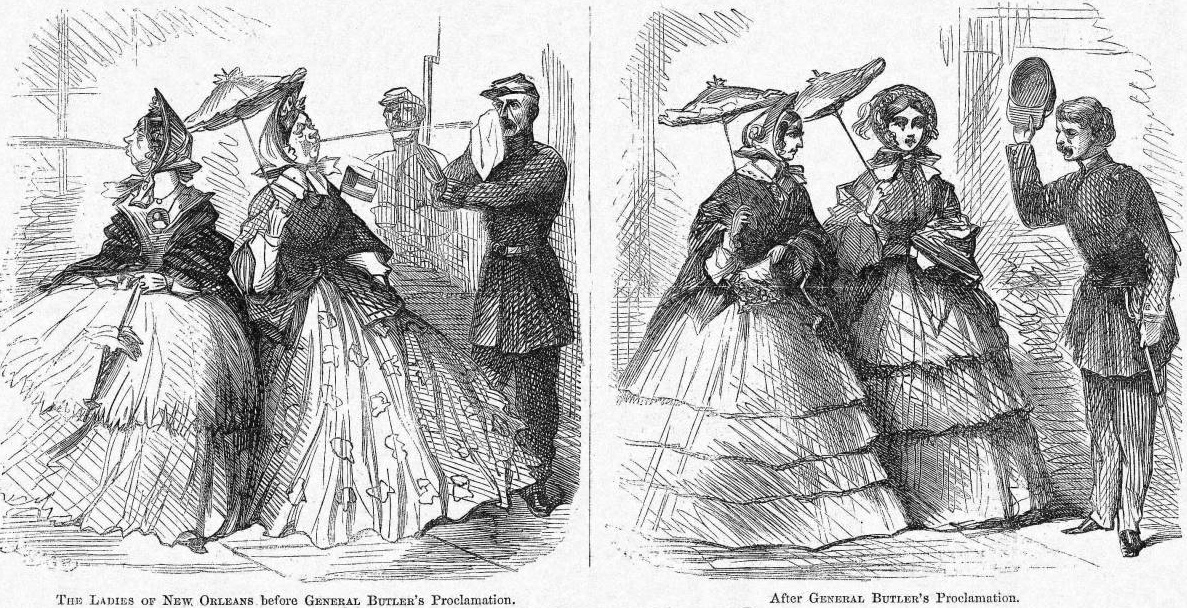
Cartoon from Harper's Weekly, 12 July 1862

General Order No. 28 was a military decree made by Maj. Gen. Benjamin Butler during the American Civil War. Following the Battle of New Orleans, Butler established himself as military commander of that city on May 1, 1862. Many of the city's inhabitants were strongly hostile to the Federal government, and many women in particular expressed this contempt by insulting Union troops.

Accordingly, on May 15, Butler issued an order to the effect that any woman insulting or showing contempt for any officer or soldier of the United States should be "treated as a woman of the town plying her avocation," the solicitation of prostitution. The order had no sexual connotation, but it permitted soldiers not to treat women performing such acts as ladies. For example, if a woman punched a soldier, he could punch her back. Known as the Woman's Order, it was very controversial both at home and abroad, as women throughout New Orleans interpreted it as Butler legalizing rape. The general dislike over No. 28 even went so far as people printing his portrait on the bottom of chamber pots, and was a cause of Butler's removal from command of New Orleans on December 16, 1862.

== Text ==
HDQRS. DEPARTMENT OF THE GULF

New Orleans, May 15, 1862.

As the officers and soldiers of the United States have been subject to repeated insults from the women (calling themselves ladies) of New Orleans in return for the most scrupulous non-interference and courtesy on our part, it is ordered that hereafter when any female shall by word, gesture, or movement insult or show contempt for any officer or soldier of the United States she shall be regarded and held liable to be treated as a woman of the town plying her avocation.

By command of Major-General Butler:

GEO. C. STRONG,
Assistant Adjutant-General and Chief of Staff.

== Union control of New Orleans ==
Major General Benjamin F. Butler occupied the city of New Orleans on May 1, 1862. The residents of New Orleans, especially the women, did not take Butler's appointment as military general very well. Butler's troops faced "all manner of verbal and physically symbolic insults" from women, including obvious physical avoidance such as crossing the street or leaving a streetcar to avoid a Union soldier, being spat upon, and having chamber pots being dumped upon them. The Union troops were offended by the treatment, and after two weeks of occupation, Butler had had enough. He issued his General Order No. 28, which instructed Union soldiers to treat any woman who offended a soldier "as a woman of the town plying her avocation".

== Reactions ==
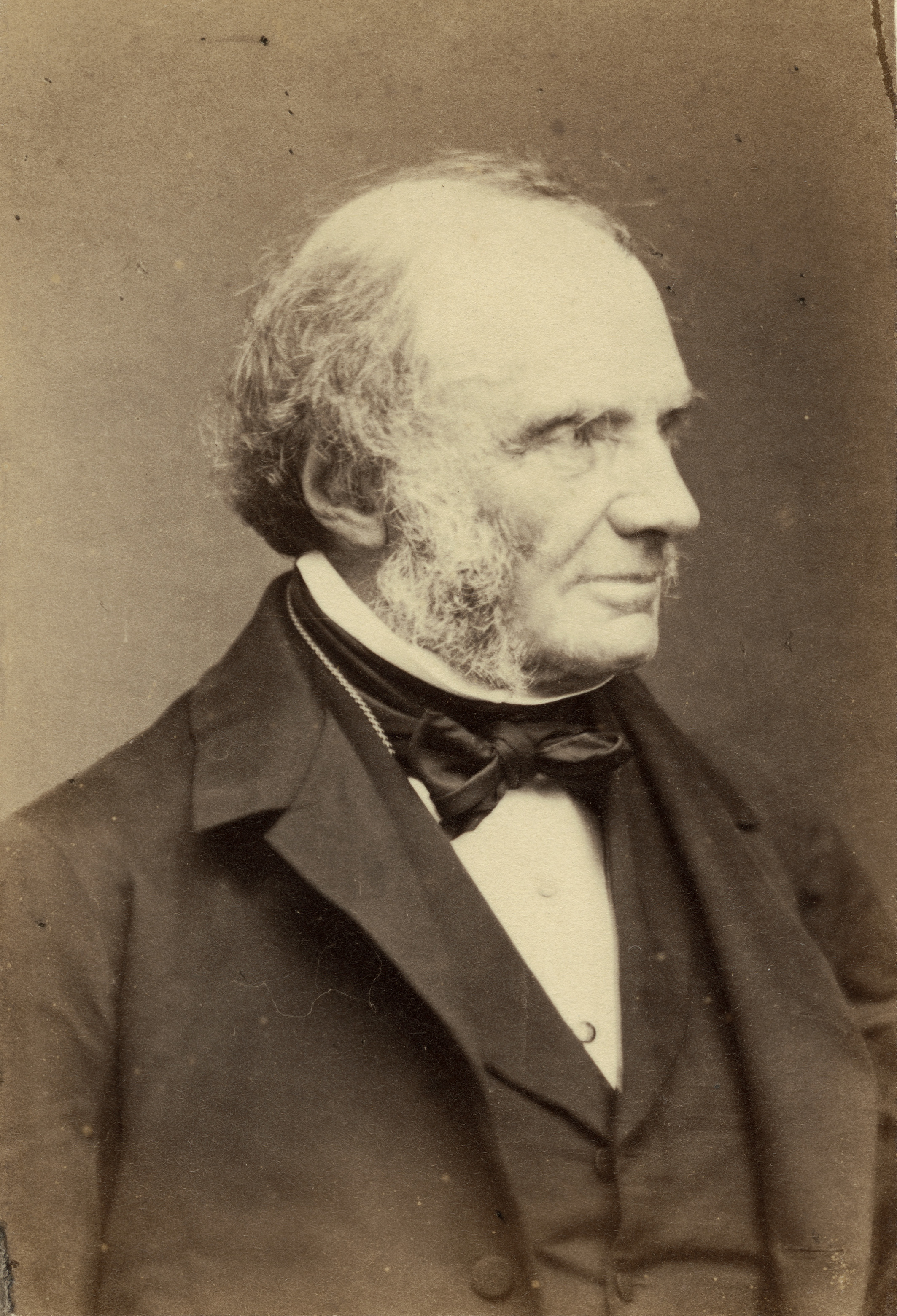
British Foreign Secretary Lord Russell, who criticized the order

The order was heavily publicized. It came under strong criticism in the South, and earned Butler the nickname "Butler the Beast" from Confederate general P.G.T. Beauregard, which stuck amongst Confederates. Conversely, it was supported in the North, with Northern newspapers claiming that the order led to calm in New Orleans; a Maine newspaper alleged Beauregard was hypocritical for criticizing the order while entrusting his own wife to Butler's personal care. Most Confederate women were offended by the order, with Catherine Ann Devereux Edmonston, a staunch secessionist, writing in her diary that it was "cold blooded barbarity". Expressing hatred for Butler and Northerners in general by writing that "We no longer will hold any intercourse with you, ye puritanical, deceitful race", Edmonston blamed Butler's wife, believing she had connived the order to demonstrate her "ferocity against the real ladies of New Orleans" for excluding her from their social circles.

Clara Solomon, a 17-year-old Jewish girl from New Orleans, expressed similar sentiments. The war had impoverished her family, with Solomon's father moving to Virginia to supply war materiel to Confederate forces, forcing her mother and sisters to sew for money. A woman with a deep-rooted hatred towards Union troops, she found the order unnecessary and offensive, writing that "what anyway could a woman's taunts do to" the soldiers. The order was also criticized in Britain; British Foreign Secretary Lord Russell stated the order was a "more intolerable tyranny than any civilized country in our day [has] been subjected to." The Saturday Review, a pro-Confederate London newspaper, also criticized the order, accusing Butler of "gratifying his own revenge" and likening him to an uncivilized dictator:

If he had possessed any of the honourable feeling which is usually associated with a soldier's profession, he would not have made war on women. If he had even been endowed with the ordinary magnanimity of a Red Indian, his revenge would have been satiated before now. It required not only the nature of a savage, but of a very mean and pitiful kind of savage, to be induced by indignation at a woman's smile to inflict an imprisonment so degrading in its character as that which seems to constitute his favourite punishment, and accompanied by privations so cruel... It is only a pity that so unadulterated a barbarian should have got hold of an Anglo-Saxon name.

The New York Times responded to British criticism of the order by defending Butler, noting that he "was in a rebellious city trying to restore order, so he was free to impose any measure he saw fit that would help quell the rebellion and restore order"; they also pointed out the alleged "Beauty and Booty" battle cry used by British forces attacking New Orleans during the War of 1812, "suggesting that haughty Britain ought not throw rocks from its own crystal palace". Butler defended his actions in New Orleans in a letter to The Boston Journal, claiming "the devil had entered the hearts of the women of [New Orleans]... to stir up strife" and that the order had been very effective. Contemporary Union sources supported Butler, stating that the order was unequivocally effective and resulted in women in the city and Union soldiers stationed in the city to be "honored equally" by one another, which was further evidenced by the fact that the order was essentially never acted upon by Union troops. Butler wrote that the most effective way to deal with a hostile Confederate woman was to ignore her unless she becomes a "continuous and positive nuisance", in which case he recommended that she be treated as an "undignified woman of the town" and be handed over to law enforcement. He further noted that he had arrested Confederate men for similarly hostile actions towards Union forces.

== Eugenia Levy Phillips ==
Eugenia Levy Phillips claimed to have been imprisoned under the Woman's Order, though her espionage weighed heavily against her. South Carolina-born Phillips lived in Washington, DC at the beginning of the war, married to former U.S. Representative Philip Phillips. Using her connections to Washington's elite, she spied for South Carolina, and boasted of it in her personal papers. When suspected of espionage by the Union, Phillips was detained to the house of Confederate spy Rose Greenhow. The investigators failed to find proof of espionage but banished the Phillipses and the other suspects to the Confederacy; the Phillips moved to New Orleans, months before the city fell to Union troops.

In May 1862, United States Lieutenant George Coleman de Kay, Jr. was killed leading an excursion into Baton Rouge. Butler commissioned a funeral cortège for de Kay's body, accompanied by military guard, to the cemetery in Metairie. As the funeral cortège passed by, Phillips "laughed gaily" and mocked the dead soldier, per Butler's witnesses. Phillips said her laughter was unrelated to the solemn ceremony filling her street, and she was simply enjoying her veranda. Butler treated the suspected spy as he would a repeat male offender, ordering her arrested and sentenced to two years' imprisonment in a military prison at Ship Island. Though her sentence was "without communication", she was permitted to bring a "servant" of color, ate the same food as the soldiers, and her captors so gracious that she sent letters of gratitude after her release some months later (earlier than sentenced because she claimed pregnancy at age 42). Nonetheless, she wrote a memoir highlighting her stoic Lost Cause forbearance, casting her treatment as harsh and herself as a martyr. Though she admitted espionage in her private papers, Phillips publicly protested being called a spy, labeling the accusations "shameful" and condemnatory.

Perhaps unaware of Phillips's espionage, family friend Clara Solomon expressed "great shock" that Phillips was imprisoned for "laughing and mocking" a dead soldier's funeral cortège. Catherine Edmonston sympathized with Phillips and the "foul wrong" and "horrible outrage" placed against her.

== Aftermath ==
Butler claimed that the order was effective in quieting the women of New Orleans, but he was only partially correct. Women in New Orleans still presented a very real political and military threat to the imposing Union Army, despite only a small number of women continuing to be politically active after the order and the arrest of Phillips.

Butler was removed from his command of New Orleans on December 16, 1862. The international attention garnered from the order contributed to his removal from New Orleans, as did his threats aimed at foreign consuls.
