= Fort Jackson, Louisiana =

- Fort Jackson
- U.S. National Register of Historic Places
- U.S. National Historic Landmark
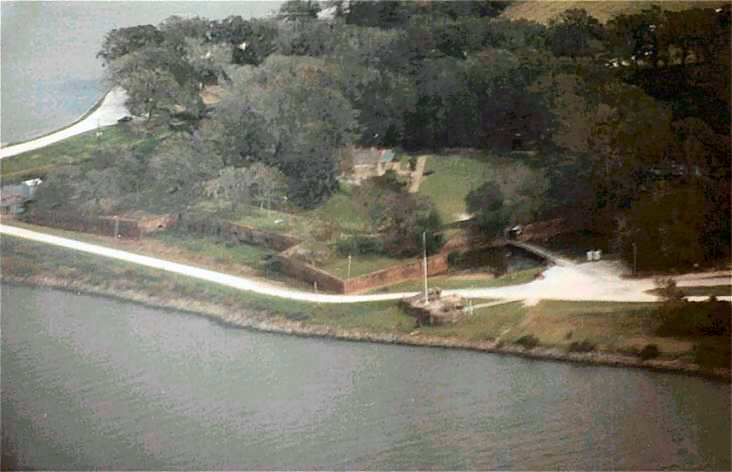

- Location within Louisiana Location within the United States
- Location: Plaquemines Parish, Louisiana, USA
- Nearest city: Triumph, Louisiana
- Coordinates: 29°21′25″N 89°27′20″W
- Built: 1822–32
- NRHP reference No.: 66000379

Significant dates
- Added to NRHP: October 15, 1966
- Designated NHL: December 19, 1960

Fort Jackson is a historic masonry fort located 40 miles (64 km) up river from the mouth of the Mississippi River in Plaquemines Parish, Louisiana. It was constructed as a coastal defense of New Orleans, between 1822 and 1832, and it was a battle site during the American Civil War. It is a National Historic Landmark. It was damaged by Hurricanes Katrina and Rita, and its condition is threatened. It is marked Battery Millar on some maps, for the Endicott era work built nearby it.

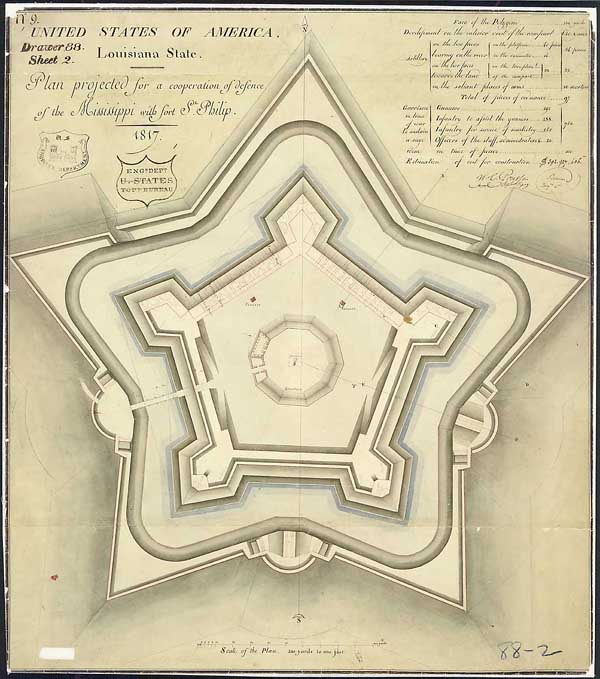
Plan for Fort Jackson, Drawn in 1817

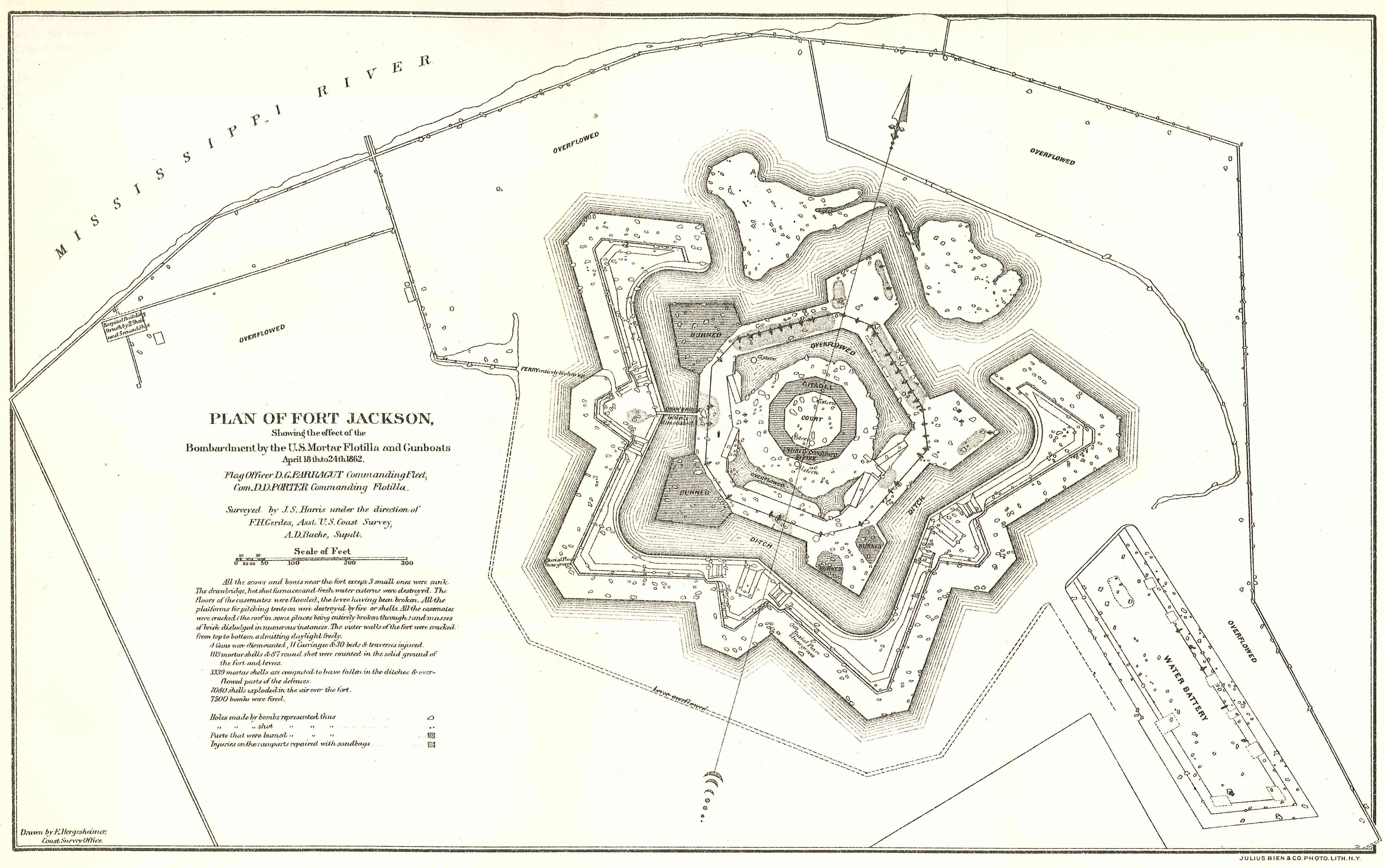
Plan of Fort Jackson showing damage done by the mortar bombardment and gunboats from April 18 to 24, 1862.

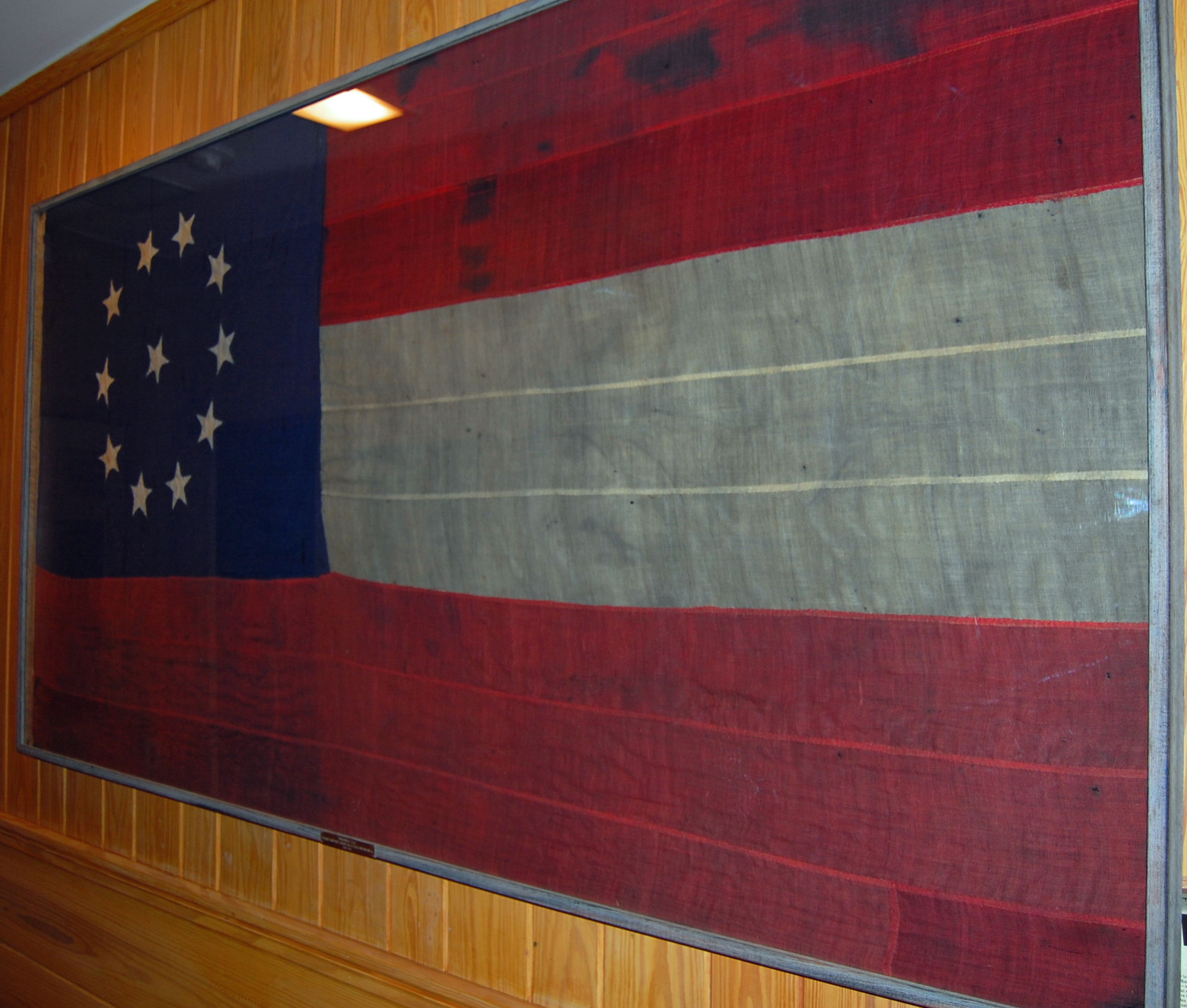
Confederate National Flag captured from Fort Jackson

Fort Jackson is situated approximately 70 miles (110 km) south of New Orleans on the western bank of the Mississippi, approximately 2.5 miles (4.0 km) south of Triumph, Louisiana. The older Fort St. Philip is located opposite of Fort Jackson on the eastern bank; this West Bank fort was constructed after the War of 1812 on the advice of Andrew Jackson, for whom it is named.

The fort was occupied off and on for various military purposes from its completion until after World War I, when it served as a training station. It is now a National Historic Landmark and historical museum owned and operated by Plaquemines Parish.

Fort Jackson was the site of the Battle of Forts Jackson and St. Philip from April 16 to April 28, 1862, during the American Civil War. The Confederate-controlled fort was besieged for 12 days by the fleet of U.S. Navy Flag Officer David Farragut. Fort Jackson fell on April 28 after the Union fleet bombarded it and then sailed past its guns. A mutiny against the officers and conditions then occurred and the fort fell to the Union. Union forces then went on to capture New Orleans.

Following the engagement, Fort Jackson was used as a Union prison. It was here that the French champagne magnate Charles Heidsieck was held for seven months on charges of spying.

On December 9, 1863, an armed uprising by black soldiers in the 4th Corps D'Afrique Corps D'Afrique (redesignated the following year as the 76th United States Colored Troops United States Colored Troops) resulted in shots being fired but no casualties. Soldiers were incensed at low pay, suspected sex crimes committed by white officers on black female laundry workers near the fort, and the torturous disciplinary methods meted out by a Colonel Augustus Benedict, a white officer stationed at the fort.

== Modern times ==
On November 9, 1927, the state of Louisiana sold Fort Jackson as a surplus government property to Mr. and Mrs. H. J. Harvey, who later donated the property to the parish in 1960 in the hopes that the fort, and the 82 acres of land that it sits on, would be restored. The fort was declared a National Historic Landmark in 1960, and was also listed on the National Register of Historic Places in 1967. Plaquemines Parish Commission Council began renovations on the fort in 1961, with the National Park Service stating that "The fort area had become a jungle with mud-filled tunnels infested with snakes and flooded with water". In the 1960s, Leander Perez threatened to turn Fort St. Philip, on the opposite side of the river, into a prison for advocates of desegregation ("outside agitators") who entered the parish.

The fort site was later opened as a park with only the outside grounds open for visitors. The interior of the fort is open to the public on occasion. The Fort Jackson Museum is open to the public, but it is not at the fort site. Rather, it is located approximately 1 mile (1.6 km) southwest from Fort Jackson in Plaquemines Parish's District 9 office at 38039 Hwy 23, Buras, LA 70041.

== Storm damage ==
Due to its low-lying location along the Mississippi River, Fort Jackson has been repeatedly exposed to severe flooding and storm surge from hurricanes. The fort was inundated with approximately 20 feet (6.1 m) of water during Hurricane Betsy (Category 4) in September 1965 and Hurricane Camille (Category 5) in August 1969, causing extensive water damage to its masonry walls and interior structures.

In 2005, Hurricane Katrina produced a catastrophic storm surge that overwhelmed Plaquemines Parish. Fort Jackson was submerged under more than 30 feet (9.1 m) of floodwaters, and much of the site remained underwater for up to six weeks following Katrina and Hurricane Rita the next month. This prolonged flooding destroyed many historic exhibits and inflicted structural damage on the fort's brick walls, foundations, and moat drainage systems. Electrical and mechanical systems were ruined, and the museum was closed to the public for years.

The damage prompted a major rehabilitation project led by Plaquemines Parish and contractors, completed in 2011, which included rebuilding drainage pumps, replacing water lines, and restoring electrical infrastructure to make the site safe and accessible again. Despite these efforts, Fort Jackson remains highly vulnerable to future hurricanes and sea level rise, and ongoing maintenance is required to preserve its structural integrity and historical significance.

== Other uses ==
Since 1970, The grounds of Fort Jackson have been the site of both the Plaquemines Parish Fair and Orange Festival.

The fort was used to treat oily birds in the early weeks of the Deepwater Horizon oil spill. The treatment facility was moved on July 4, 2010, to Hammond, Louisiana, in order to make it less vulnerable to hurricanes.

== See also ==
- National Register of Historic Places listings in Plaquemines Parish, Louisiana
- List of National Historic Landmarks in Louisiana
- Jackson Barracks, New Orleans
- Fort de la Balize
- Fort De La Boulaye
