= Mississippi flood of 1973 =

Severe weather event in the southern United States

1973 Mississippi River floods
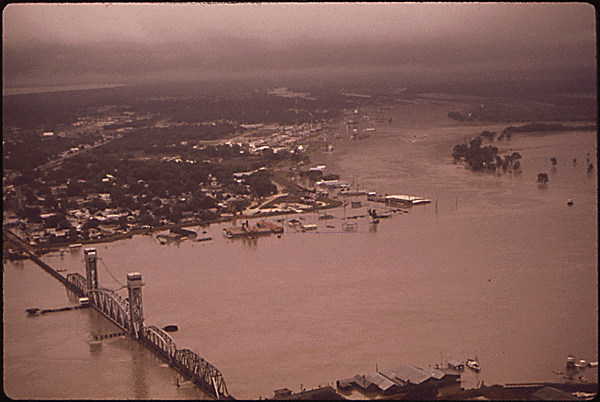
- Morgan City, Louisiana inundated during May 1973
- Date: December 1972-June 1973
- Location: Mississippi Valley, Mississippi River Delta
- Deaths: 33
- Property damage: $252.7 million USD

The Mississippi flood of 1973 occurred between March and May 1973 on the lower Mississippi River. The flooding was the third most severe along the U.S.'s Mississippi River during the 20th century.

== Winter of 1972-1973 ==
A series of unusually cold winters in the river basin concluded in the winter of 1972–1973, when high precipitation saturated much of the watershed, especially in the Ohio Valley and lower Mississippi Valley. This was followed by more rain in early 1973, with river flow cresting on March 31 at Red River Landing, Louisiana, and a heavy snowmelt in the Rocky Mountains which caused western tributaries such as the Missouri and Arkansas to form a final catastrophic high in June. The flood resulted in the largest volume of water to flow down the Mississippi since the Great Mississippi Flood of 1927. Both the Bonnet Carre Spillway and the Morganza Spillway were employed. The Bonnet Carre was fully opened between April 7 and June 14 for a record 75 days. The 1973 flood was the first time the Morganza Spillway was opened: from April 19 through June 13.

At Memphis, Tennessee, the Mississippi was over flood stage for 63 days, more than that of the historic 1927 flood, and the river was above flood stage for an even longer 107 days at upstream Cairo, Illinois. Out of the seven largest floods on the Mississippi between 1927 and 1997, the 1973 event ranked third in both volume discharged and duration but only sixth in flood height. Over $250 million of damages were incurred mainly in the Mississippi Valley states of Missouri, Arkansas, Tennessee, Mississippi and Louisiana.

The largest single inundation, south of St. Louis, Missouri, was caused by a series of catastrophic levee failures on the west bank of the river and ultimately covered almost 9,400 square miles (24,000 km^{2}). The Morganza Spillway was opened, flooding portions of the Atchafalaya River basin in Louisiana and causing the deaths of thousands of head of livestock and white-tailed deer. The 1973 flood was notable for nearly causing the failure of the Old River Control Structure above the Mississippi River Delta, which would have sent the Mississippi's main channel flowing into the Atchafalaya River and bypassing most of the delta region including the major port of New Orleans, Louisiana.

== Flood stages ==
In spite of record high flows, flood stages were not as high as past events. Red River Landing, Louisiana reached 58.22 feet on May 13 and was 9th highest crest of record. The flood stage at Baton Rouge was 42.10 feet on May 10. Farther down the River at Donaldsonville the flood stage reached 32.30 feet on April 9, which was the 10th highest crest of record. At Reserve, the crest was 24.50 ft on April 8, 7 highest on record. On April 7, New Orleans crested at 18.47 ft.

The flow past Baton Rouge peaked at 1.38 million cubic feet per second (39,000 cubic metres per second) on May 13. The project design flood capacity at Baton Rouge is 1.38 million cubic feet per second (39,000 m^{3}/s). The flow past New Orleans peaked at 1.257 million cubic feet per second (35,600 cubic metres per second) on April 15; the project design flood flow is 1.25 million cubic feet per second (35,000 cubic metres per second) with the balance flowing through the Bonnet Carre Spillway. Discharge through the Bonnet Carre Spillway increased the level of Lake Pontchartrain to 3 feet above normal, peaking at 14.7 feet at mid-lake.

== See also ==
- List of Mississippi River floods
