= Project design flood =

Hydrology concept

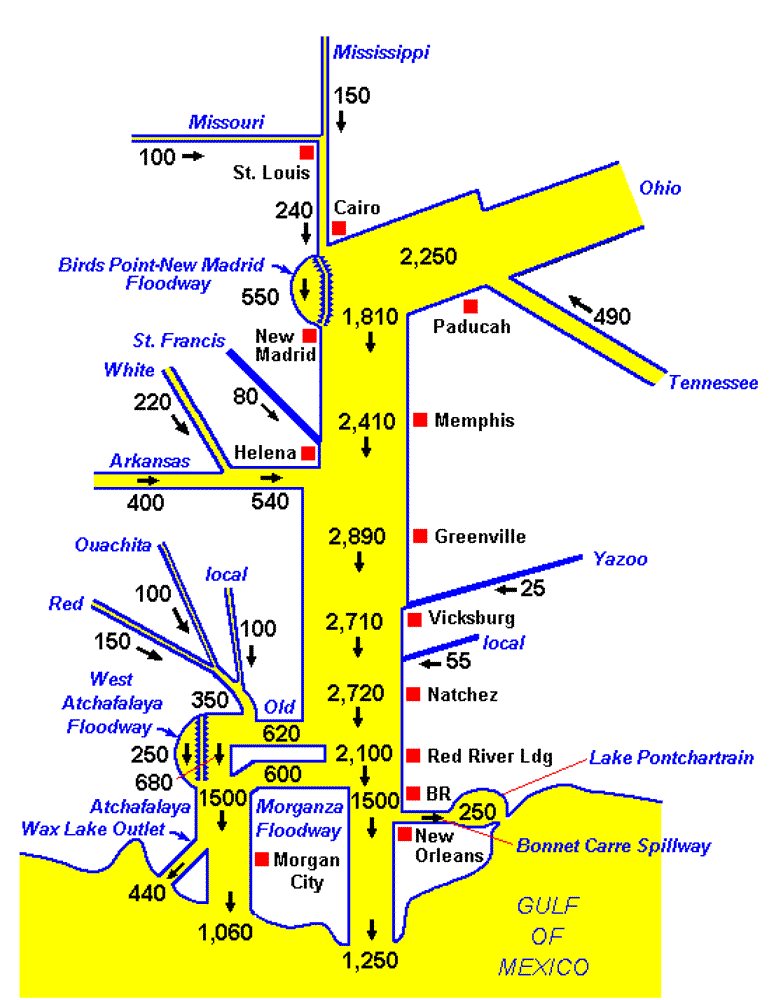
Flow capacity for the Mississippi river in thousands of cfs based on the 1956 project design flood.

The project design flood is a hypothetical "maximum probable" flood of the Mississippi River used by the United States Army Corps of Engineers to aid in the design and execution of flood protection in the Mississippi Valley.

The current project design flood was developed in 1956 by the Mississippi River Commission with input from the Weather Bureau. It is based on a scenario of three rain events in the lower Mississippi Valley occurring 3 days apart: the January 1937 (increased by 10%), January 1950, and then the February 1938 rain event with its center adjusted 90 miles (140 km) to the north and rainfall pattern rotated to achieve a hypothetical worst-case flood of the tributaries of the Mississippi River. Assumptions were made based on the completion of tributary reservoirs and dams by 1960. When the Commission reviewed the plan after the 1973 Mississippi River floods, the Project Design Flood in use was determined to be "based on sound technology that was still reliable by current standards. The project design flood peak discharges remained unchanged."

Once the project design flood was developed, flow rates at critical points are used to determine how high levees need to be, how deep the dredging needs to be, and the flowrates at which flood control structures need to be used.

== 1928 project design flood ==
In response to the Great Mississippi Flood of 1927, the Flood Control Act of 1928 authorized the Mississippi River and Tributaries Project (MR&T), which is implemented by the Mississippi River Commission (MRC). The MRC estimated a maximum probable flood discharge of 2,250,000 cubic feet per second (64,000 m^{3}/s) at Cairo, Illinois that was greater than the 1927 flood but less than the 1927 flood combined with the maximum recorded discharge of the Ohio River in 1913. In a separate analysis, the U.S. Weather Bureau determined that a "maximum possible" flood would result in a discharge of 2,400,000 cubic feet per second (68,000 m^{3}/s) based on the maximum recorded flows of the upper Mississippi, Ohio, Cumberland, and Tennessee Rivers. In a combined analysis, the higher flow rate estimate was used.

Adding the flows of the Arkansas and White Rivers, the maximum flow farther downriver at Arkansas City, Arkansas was estimated to be 2,850,000 cubic feet per second (81,000 m^{3}/s) with a flood stage of 74 feet (23 m). Adding the flows of the Yazoo and Red Rivers, the Weather Bureau estimated a flow of 3,000,000 cubic feet per second (85,000 m^{3}/s) just north of Baton Rouge at Red River Landing, Louisiana.

== 1941 project design flood ==
The Ohio River flood of 1937 caused the flood stage at Cairo to reach 59.5 feet (18.1 m) despite a flow of only 2,100,000 cubic feet per second (59,000 m^{3}/s). In response, the United States Congress ordered the MR&T to review of the flood control plan. Maximum flows were changed to 2,600,000 cubic feet per second (74,000 m^{3}/s) at Cairo, 3,065,000 cubic feet per second (86,800 m^{3}/s) at Arkansas City with the White River backwater area levee overtopped, and Red River Landing unchanged at 3,000,000 cubic feet per second (85,000 m^{3}/s).

== Current project design flood ==
The current project design flood was developed at the request of the Senate Public Works Committee in 1954. The Mississippi River Commission and the Weather Bureau worked together to investigate hypothetical flood conditions. The study of a set of 35 combinations of actual storms resulted in the selection of combination called "Hypo-Flood 58A," a combination of previous storms in 1937, 1938, and 1950. The peak discharges were found to be 2,360,000 cubic feet per second (67,000 m^{3}/s) at Cairo, 2,890,000 cubic feet per second (82,000 m^{3}/s) at Arkansas City, and 3,030,000 cubic feet per second (86,000 m^{3}/s) at Red River Landing.

After the 1973 Mississippi River floods, the MRC reviewed the project design flood and found that it was still reliable based on current standards.

Project Design Flood Flow Rates
Location	River	Flow (ft^{3}/s)	Flow (m^{3}/s)	100 year Flood Stage
St. Louis, Missouri	Mississippi R.	150,000	4247	
St. Louis	Missouri R.	100,000	2832	
Paducah, Kentucky	Ohio R.	1,760,000	49,838	
Paducah	Tennessee R.	490,000	13,875	
Cairo, Illinois	Mississippi R.	240,000	6796	63.2 ft.
Cairo	Ohio R.	2,250,000	63,713	
	Birds Point-New Madrid Floodway	550,000	15,574	
New Madrid, Missouri	Mississippi R.	1,810,000	51,253	
Memphis, Tennessee	Mississippi R.	2,410,000	68,244	53.9 ft
Greenville, Mississippi	Mississippi R.	2,890,000	81,836	
Vicksburg, Mississippi	Mississippi R.	2,710,000	76,739	
Natchez, Mississippi	Mississippi R.	2,720,000	77,022	
	Old River Control Structure	620,000	17,556	
Red River Landing, Louisiana	Mississippi R.	2,100,000	59,465	
	Morganza Floodway	600,000	16,990	
Baton Rouge, Louisiana	Mississippi R.	1,500,000	42,4755	
	Bonnet Carre Spillway	250,000	7079	
New Orleans, Louisiana	Mississippi R.	1,250,000	35,396	
	Atchafalaya Wax Lake Outlet	440,000	12,459	
Morgan City, Louisiana	Lower Atchafalaya Basin Floodway	1,060,000	30,0165	

== See also ==
- Mississippi River floods
- Bonnet Carre Spillway
