= Sidney A. Murray Jr. Hydroelectric Station =

Coordinates: 31°05′17″N 91°37′08″W

The Sidney A. Murray Jr. Hydroelectric Station, also known as Louisiana Hydroelectric (LA Hydro), opened in response to a need for a non-polluting, less-costly power source for Vidalia, Louisiana. A site approximately 40 miles south of the town was selected for the new facility. The 192 MW plant started full-scale operations in 1990. It was designed to rely on the Mississippi River's natural flow and elevation drop at the Old River Control Structure, therefore not needing a large impound dam. It was also built in accordance with the U.S. Army Corps of Engineers existing water management objective with minimal impacts on the surrounding environment. The station operates more continuously than most run-of-the-river hydro plants, with a capacity factor of approximately 55% and an estimated availability in excess of 99%.

It is currently under an approved 42-year power purchase contract with Louisiana Power & Light (a subsidiary of Entergy). The city of Vidalia purchases 6% of the power with an option to purchase up to 15% of the generated power.

The LA Hydro is the largest prefabricated power plant in the world. Its main business office is located in Vidalia.

== Electricity Production ==
Generation (MWh) of Sidney A. Murray Jr. Hydroelectric Station
Year	Jan	Feb	Mar	Apr	May	Jun	Jul	Aug	Sep	Oct	Nov	Dec	Annual (Total)
2001	6,457	71,522	92,884	87,213	83,754	109,438	68,104	39,657	23,705	29,768	31,911	87,804	732,217
2002	53,983	91,940	85,666	121,301	113,767	131,574	62,225	30,562	25,454	57,238	56,689	61,042	891,441
2003	85,561	53,798	105,141	94,863	87,494	114,354	85,262	61,652	47,256	38,006	40,124	78,480	891,991
2004	92,220	94,375	99,273	94,331	113,292	113,628	112,516	57,498	56,934	58,324	91,162	115,272	1,098,825
2005	116,188	116,099	112,518	116,346	89,726	67,544	52,622	23,857	33,729	27,106	22,833	32,380	810,948
2006	53,694	82,036	78,947	81,966	100,980	51,132	32,364	18,861	19,442	44,886	74,940	73,967	713,215
2007	101,849	76,961	100,008	104,998	117,993	80,771	54,119	36,131	44,120	25,555	32,278	51,859	826,642
2008	75,212	75,215	104,356	125,592	133,269	124,981	129,568	91,534	52,559	60,314	35,693	56,080	1,064,373
2009	100,881	87,382	106,346	125,916	130,160	130,985	98,002	84,715	58,477	90,194	110,183	113,110	1,236,351
2010	104,529	116,029	116,627	114,519	101,152	114,540	117,190	110,134	65,993	57,695	29,781	60,605	1,108,794
2011	51,480	48,280	98,542	111,061	111,456	120,207	123,856	98,595	65,485	45,553	54,361	115,143	1,044,019
2012	122,126	109,555	111,029	91,417	87,332	34,197	19,763	13,582	16,364	19,223	21,099	34,257	679,944
2013	86,731	103,346	106,707	98,491	126,938	126,869	124,777	89,360	38,779	33,812	37,846	70,905	1,044,561
2014	107,404	78,986	105,238	110,430	133,519	117,015	111,917	62,724	63,811	71,926	56,458	70,610	1,090,038
2015	83,588	56,940	87,059	93,291	88,088	102,770	117,447	109,422	56,778	42,435	45,032	116,186	999,036
2016	83,588	56,940	87,059	93,291	88,088	102,770	117,447	109,422	56,778	42,435	45,032	116,186	1,103,023
2017	82,060	73,591	92,574	90,135	96,974	93,739	77,171	62,907	57,419	51,445	58,936	69,287	906,238
2018	106,969	106,002	107,731	113,692	127,348	116,000	98,915	85,769	73,340	72,402	84,490	87,197	1,179,855
2019	126,820	205,704	77,917	149,457	174,085	105,562	168,640	75,632	80,203	75,346	69,641	56,659	1,365,666
2020	61,819	130,122	120,233	146,931	160,377	72,017	99,974	78,521	102,937	100,633	62,234	67,945	1,203,743
2021	104,466	55,061	92,752	84,112	177,991	132,866	131,022	87,628	59,874	64,813	56,626	61,967	1,109,178
2022	--	--	--	--	--	--	--	--	--	--	--	--	--
2023	--	--	--	--	--	--	--	--	--	--	--	--	--
