= Old River Control Structure =

Floodgate system in Louisiana, USA

Coordinates: 31°04′36″N 91°35′52″W

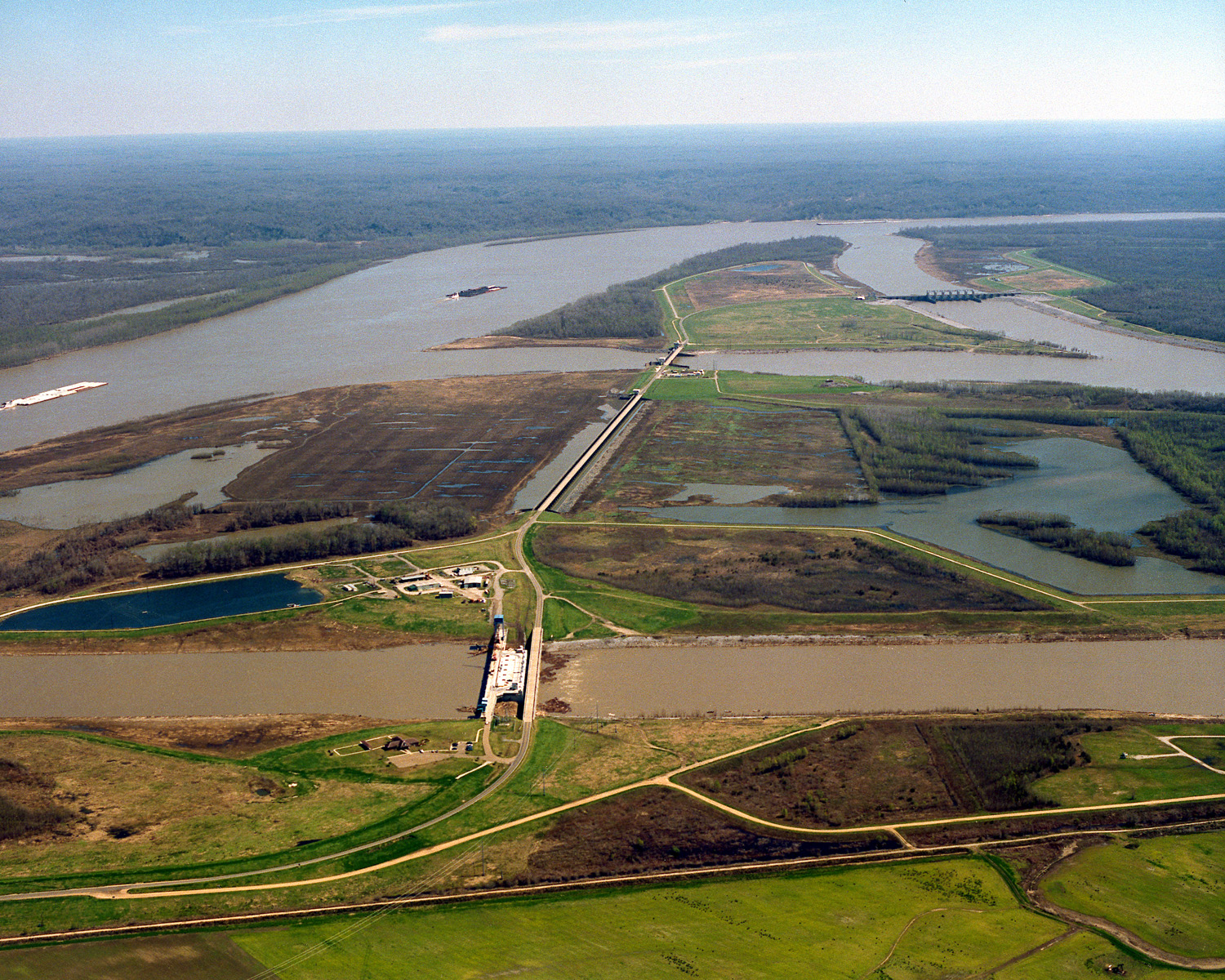
The Old River Control Structure complex. View is to the east-southeast, looking downriver on the Mississippi, with the three dams across channels leading to the Atchafalaya River to the right of the Mississippi. Concordia Parish, Louisiana is in the foreground, on the right, and Wilkinson County, Mississippi, is in the background, across the Mississippi on the left.

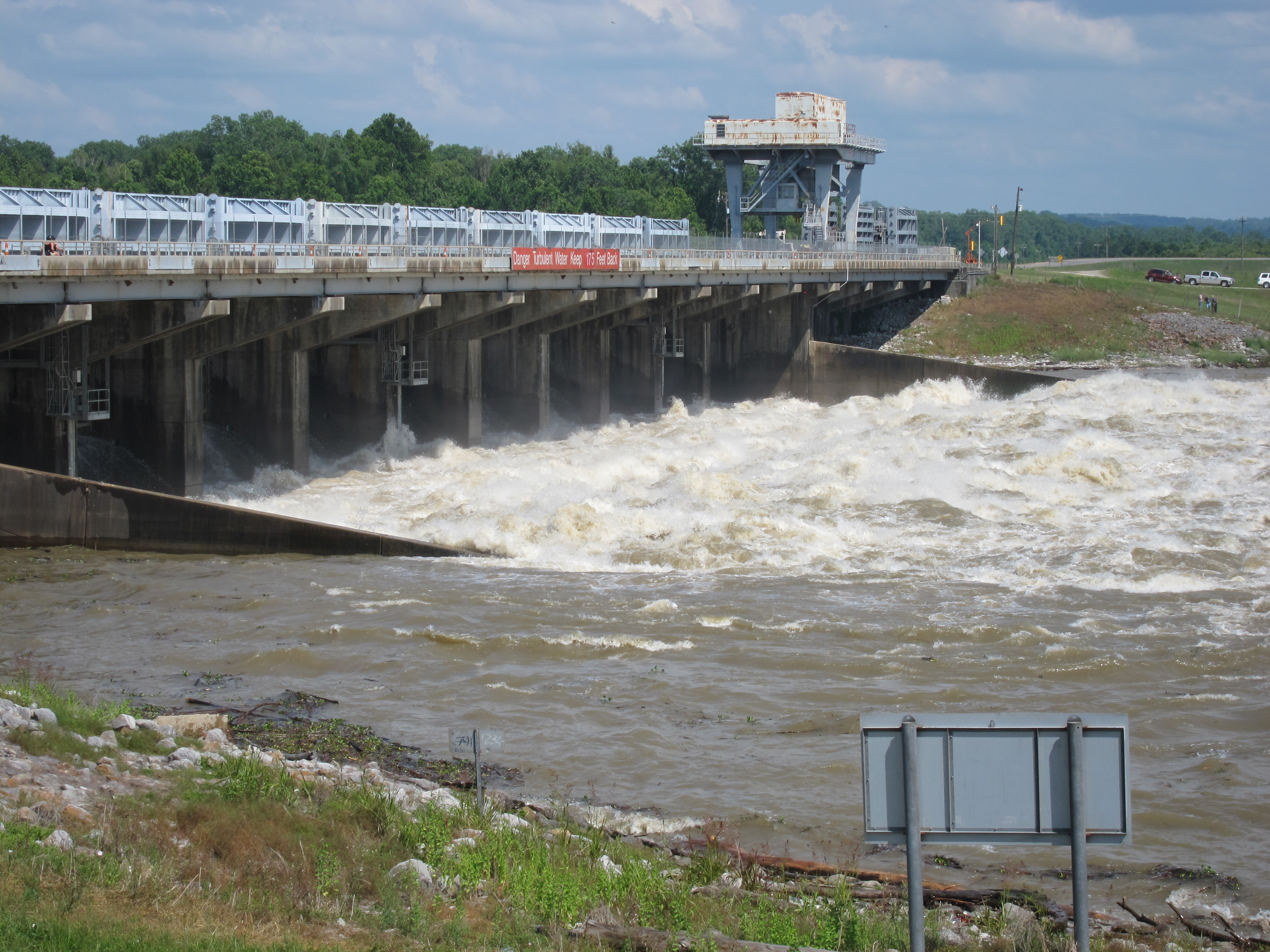
Old River low-sill control structure discharging water into the Atchafalaya, May 2011

The Old River Control Structure (ORCS) is a floodgate system in a branch of the Mississippi River in central Louisiana. It regulates the flow of water from the Mississippi into the Atchafalaya River, thereby preventing the Mississippi River from changing course. Completed in 1963, the complex was built by the U.S. Army Corps of Engineers in a side channel of the Mississippi known as "Old River", between the Mississippi's current channel and the Atchafalaya Basin, a former channel of the Mississippi.

The ORCS is a complex containing the original low-sill and overbank structures, as well as the auxiliary structure that was constructed after the low-sill structure was damaged during the Mississippi River flood of 1973. The complex also contains a navigation lock and the Sidney A. Murray Jr. Hydroelectric Station.

== Old River ==
Formation of the Atchafalaya River and construction of the Old River Control Structure.

Before the 15th century, the Red River and Mississippi River were entirely separate and flowed more or less parallel to one another. Beginning in the 15th century, the Mississippi developed a small westward oxbow loop, later called Turnbull's Bend, near present-day Angola, Louisiana. This loop eventually intersected the Red River, making the downstream part of the Red River a distributary of the Mississippi; this distributary came to be called the Atchafalaya River.

In the heyday of steamboats along the Mississippi, such a vessel would need several hours to travel the 20 miles (32 km) of Turnbull's Bend, after which it would have progressed only about 1 mile (1.6 km) from the entrance to the bend. To reduce travel time, Captain Henry M. Shreve, a river engineer and namesake of Shreveport, Louisiana, dug a canal in 1831 through the neck of Turnbull's Bend; this canal became known as Shreve's Cut. At the next high water, the Mississippi roared through this channel. The upper portion of Turnbull's Bend was referred to as Upper Old River, while the larger, lower portion became known as the Lower Old River.

At first, the Lower Old River would flow eastward to the Mississippi, until 1839 when locals began removing the Great Raft, a natural log jam that was obstructing the Atchafalaya River. The project was finished in 1840. After that, the Lower Old River would flow eastward to the Mississippi when the Red River was high and the Mississippi was low, and westward to the Atchafalaya when the Mississippi was high and the Red River was low. Over time, the number of days when the river flowed east to the Mississippi decreased and the number of days when the river flowed west increased, until eventually the Lower Old River flowed west over half the time. By 1880, it rarely flowed eastward and was rapidly capturing more of the flow of the Mississippi. With this increased water flow, the channel of the Atchafalaya River was eroded deeper and wider throughout the late 19th and early 20th century.

The U.S. Army Corps of Engineers measured the amount of water flowing through the Mississippi and compared it to the amount entering the Atchafalaya Basin by monitoring "latitude flow" at the latitude of the Red River Landing, located five miles (8.0 km) downstream of Old River. In this case, latitude flow is a combination of the flows of the Mississippi and Atchafalaya rivers as they cross an imaginary line at that latitude. Between 1850 and 1950, the percentage of latitude flow entering the Atchafalaya River had increased from less than 10 percent to about 30 percent. By 1953, the U.S. Army Corps of Engineers concluded that the Mississippi could change its course to the Atchafalaya by 1990 if it were not controlled, since this alternative path to the Gulf of Mexico through the Atchafalaya is much shorter and steeper.

The Corps completed construction on the ORCS in 1963 to prevent the main channel flow of the Mississippi from altering its current course through the natural geologic process of avulsion. Historically, this natural process of course change has occurred about every 1,000 years and is overdue. Some researchers believe the likelihood of this event increases each year, despite manmade artificial control efforts.

If the Mississippi diverts its main channel to the Atchafalaya Basin and the Atchafalaya River, it would develop a new delta south of Morgan City in southern Louisiana, greatly reducing water flow to its present channel through Baton Rouge and New Orleans, with adverse economic effects on both port cities. The Mississippi flood of 1973 almost caused the control structure to fail. Maintenance of the integrity of the ORCS, the nearby Morganza Spillway, and other levees in the area is essential to prevent such a diversion. Jeff Masters of Weather Underground notes that failure of the complex "would be a serious blow to the U.S. economy."

== Components ==
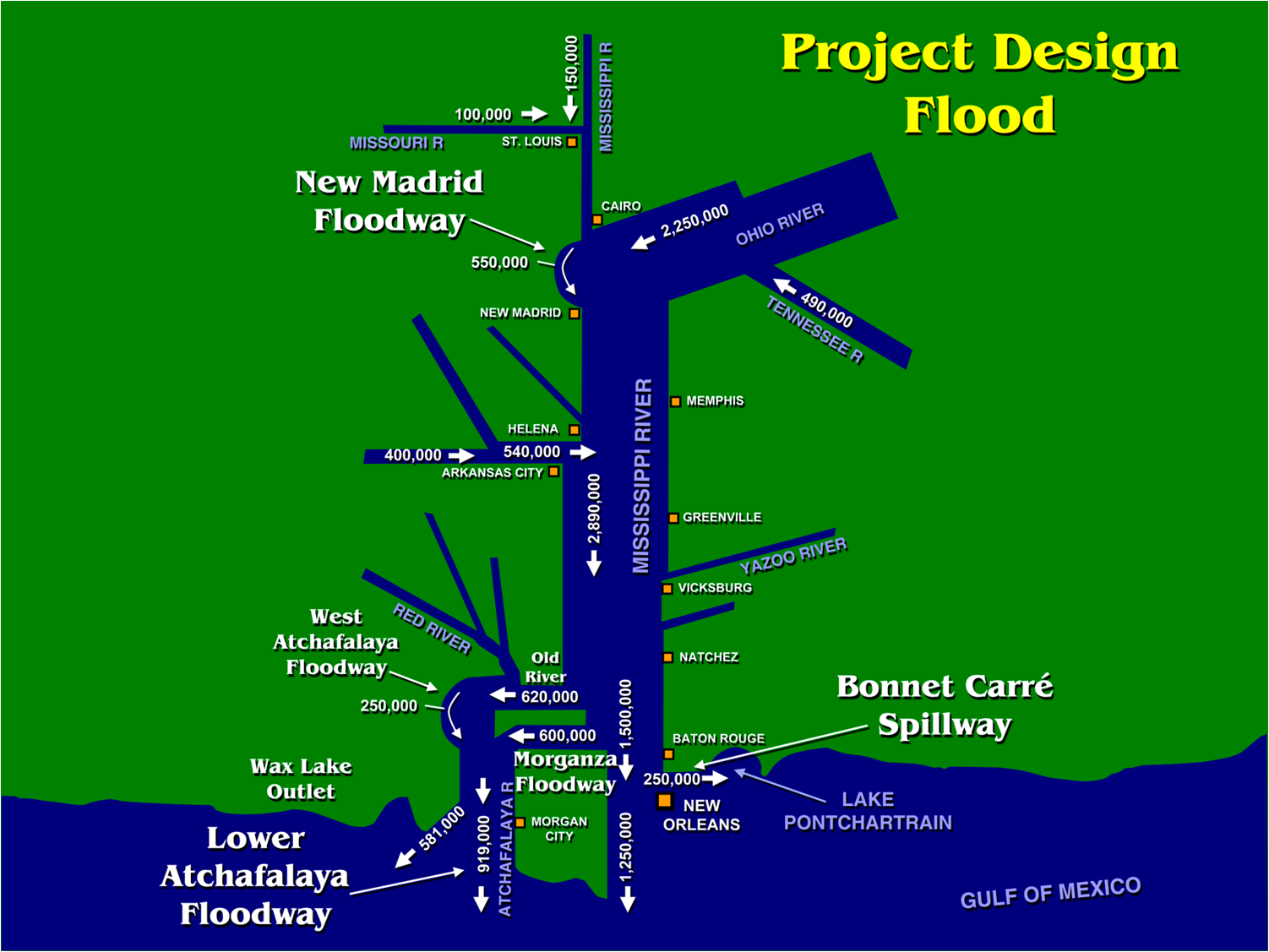
A diagram that depicts river flows associated with Project Design Flood.

The ORCS and Overbank Control Structure became operational in 1964 and expanded in 1986 with the addition of the Old River Control Auxiliary Structure (ORCAS). The primary one that regulates routine flow in the waterway is the Low Sill Control Structure. The Overbank Structure is only used when the Mississippi exceeds its banks. The ORCAS is used during floods to assist the ORCS and prevent it from being damaged by high flow rates. ORCAS was added to reduce pressure on the original floodgates after extensive damage caused by the flood of 1973. The northernmost and newest structure is the Sidney A. Murray Jr. Hydroelectric Station, completed in 1990. It provides an additional measure of control at the site. These four structures are located approximately where the Upper Old River used to be before Shreve's Cut.

A navigation channel and lock are also part of the facility design, but they are situated well south of the other structures on the Lower Old River at the Old River Lock. This makes the Lower Old River navigable, allowing ship and barge traffic between the Mississippi and the Atchafalaya/Red River. All five structures in the complex carry Louisiana Highway 15, starting at the power plant, then the Overbank Structure, then the Low Sill ORCS, followed by ORCAS, the island created between the rivers, and finally the Old River Lock.

== Operation ==
Water from the Mississippi is normally diverted into the Atchafalaya Basin only at Old River, where floodgates are routinely used to redirect the Mississippi's flow into the Atchafalaya River, such that the volume of the two rivers is split 70%/30%, respectively, as measured at the latitude of Red River Landing. This flow split was based on the approximate flow allocation between the two rivers that existed at the time of construction.

Water diverted at Old River flows into the Atchafalaya Basin, first entering the Red River then continuing down the Atchafalaya River to the Gulf of Mexico, bypassing Baton Rouge and New Orleans (see diagram). The Morganza Spillway between the Mississippi and the Atchafalaya Basin is normally closed. It can be opened in an emergency to relieve water levels and water-pressure stress on various levees and other flood-control structures, including the ORCS. The spillway can reduce stress by diverting additional water from the Mississippi into the Atchafalaya. The spillway was never used before the construction of the ORCS, and as of 2016 it has been opened only twice for flood control.

== See also ==
- Lower Mississippi River

== External sources ==
- Weeks, John. "Old River Control Structure".
