= List of Mississippi River floods =

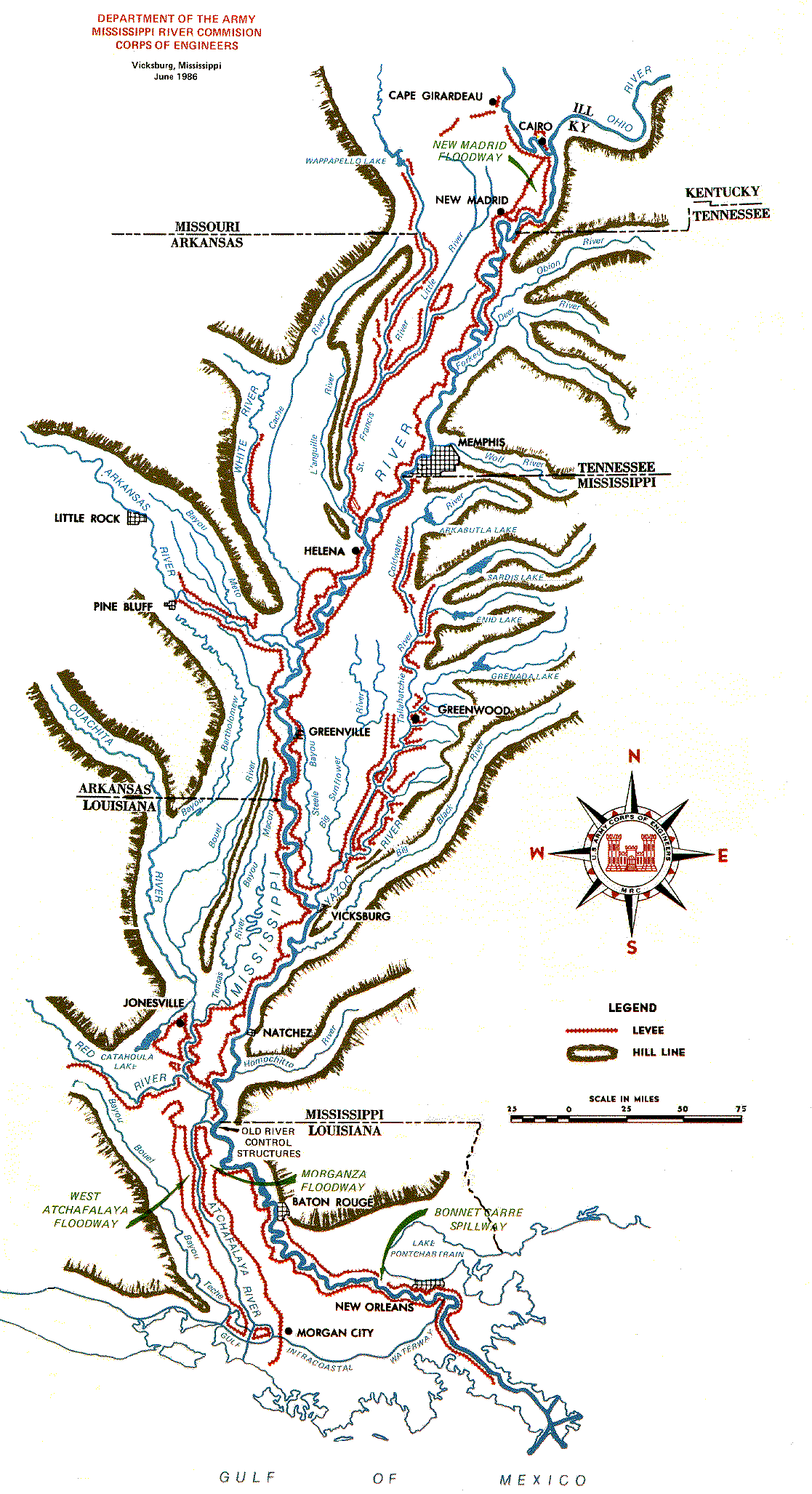
Lower Mississippi River levees.

The Mississippi River and its tributaries have flooded on numerous occasions. This is a list of major floods.

== Flood of March 1543 ==
Hernando de Soto's party was passing through a village at the confluence of the Mississippi River and Arkansas River on March 18. The ensuing flood only allowed passage by canoe and inundated fields surrounding the town.

The flooding according to Garcilaso de la Vega lasted for 80 days with the crest on the 40th day.

== 1684 Flood ==
The French explorer, La Salle, recorded a Mississippi River flood in 1684.

== Flood of 1734–35 ==
From December to June the City of New Orleans was inundated.

== Flood of 1788 ==
In July, severe flooding of the Mississippi River resulted from a hurricane landfall.

== Flood of 1809 ==
All of the lower Mississippi River was inundated by flooding.

== Flood of 1825 ==
The flood of 1825 is the last known inundation of New Orleans due to spring flooding.

== Great Flood of 1844 ==
The largest flood ever recorded on the Missouri River and Upper Mississippi River in terms of discharge. This flood was particularly devastating since the region had few if any levees at the time. Among the hardest hit were the Wyandot who lost 100 people in the diseases that occurred after the flood. The flood also is the highest recorded for the Mississippi River at St. Louis. After the flood, Congress in 1849 passed the Swamp Act providing land grants to build stronger levees.

== Great Flood of 1851 ==
The flood occurred after record-setting rainfalls across the U.S. Midwest and Plains from May to August, 1851. The State of Iowa experienced significant flooding extending to the Lower Mississippi River basin. Historical evidence suggest flooding occurred in the eastern Plains, from Nebraska to the Red River basin, but these areas were sparsely settled by white settlers in 1851. Heavy rainfall also occurred in the Ohio River basin. In June, major flooding on the Mississippi River was experienced.

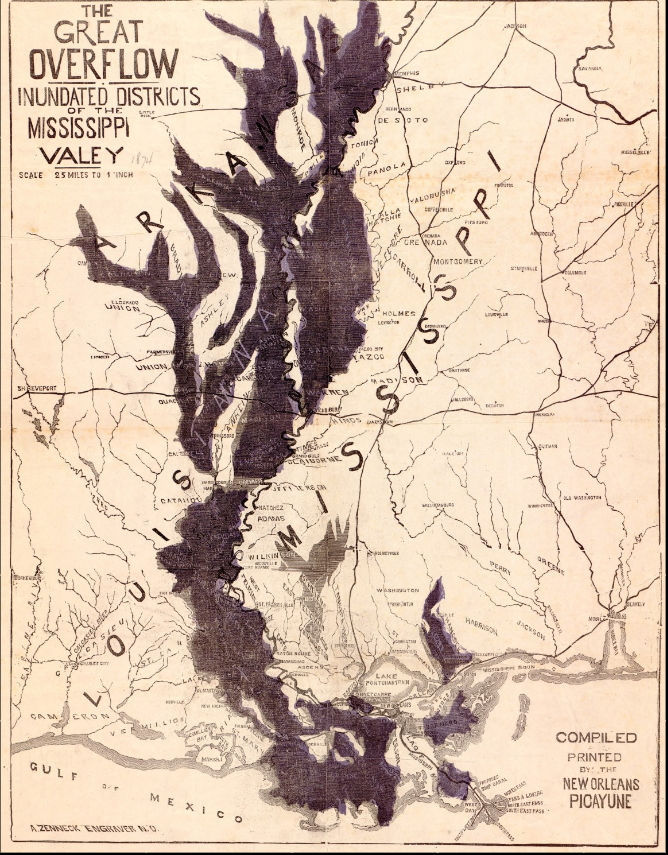
Map of areas affected by the Great Overflow of 1874.

== Great Mississippi Flood of 1874 ==
Heavy spring rains caused the Mississippi River to overflow, breaching levees and flooding enormous swathes of the Lower Mississippi Valley. The flooding began in February and only began to recede on May 20. According to the New Orleans Daily Picayune of May 3, thirty-one of Louisiana's fifty-three parishes (home to some 375,000 people) were entirely or partially underwater. The Picayune also reported that breaches at Hushpakana^{[sic.]} and Bolivar, Mississippi, had "transformed the Yazoo Valley into an inland lake." Mayor Louis A. Wiltz of New Orleans published a circular on May 30 addressed to "the Mayors of thirty-four large American cities" seeking contributions of cash and provisions for relief efforts. In the circular, the Flood of 1874 was described as the highest on record. It also included the observations of former U.S. Surveyor General for Louisiana William J. McCulloh, who estimated that a total of 12,565,060 acres had been flooded across Louisiana (8,065,000), Mississippi (2,500,000), and Arkansas (2,000,000).

== Flood of 1882 ==
Intense spring rain storms beginning on February 19, 1882, led to a rapid rise of the Ohio River and flooding along the river from Cincinnati to St. Louis. The effects were much more devastating in the Lower Mississippi Valley, with an estimated 20,000 people made homeless in Arkansas alone. Such was the devastation that, in its wake, Southern Democrats and Midwestern Republicans in Congress hailing from those states afflicted by the flooding made common cause to increase appropriations for the Rivers and Harbor Act to $19 million, $5.4 million of which was earmarked for internal improvements and federal aid to the flooded areas. While not opposed to internal improvements on principle, President Chester A. Arthur nonetheless vetoed the Act on August 1, 1882. Congress overrode his veto the following day.

== Flood of 1891 ==
Major flooding in the spring of 1891 on both the Ohio and Mississippi River, causing crevasses (bank and levee failures) in multiple locations of the lower Mississippi River valley, including Robertsonville, Mississippi; Concord, Louisiana; Carrollton (New Orleans), Louisiana; and Amesville (Marrero), Louisiana. The most devastating of these levee failures was the one located on Ames Farm in Amesville, near present-day Barataria Blvd. Caused by a farmer that dug a "rice flume" to water crops, the breach started on March 16, 1891 and rapidly opened over the course of several days and weeks, expanding to approximately 1,000 feet in width accompanied by a river stage of 14.4 feet. At its peak, the crevasse was estimated to flow approximately 100,000 cubic feet per second. The inundation of land stretched across several Louisiana Parishes, causing floodwater to flow directly towards neighboring Gretna and Plaquemines Parish, while upstream the backwater caused noticeable rises in streams as far as Thibodaux and Raceland on Bayou Lafourche. The flooding was catastrophic, causing losses to most planted crops in the region and disrupting freight and passenger rail service on the West Bank of the river for several months.

== Great Mississippi Flood of 1927 ==
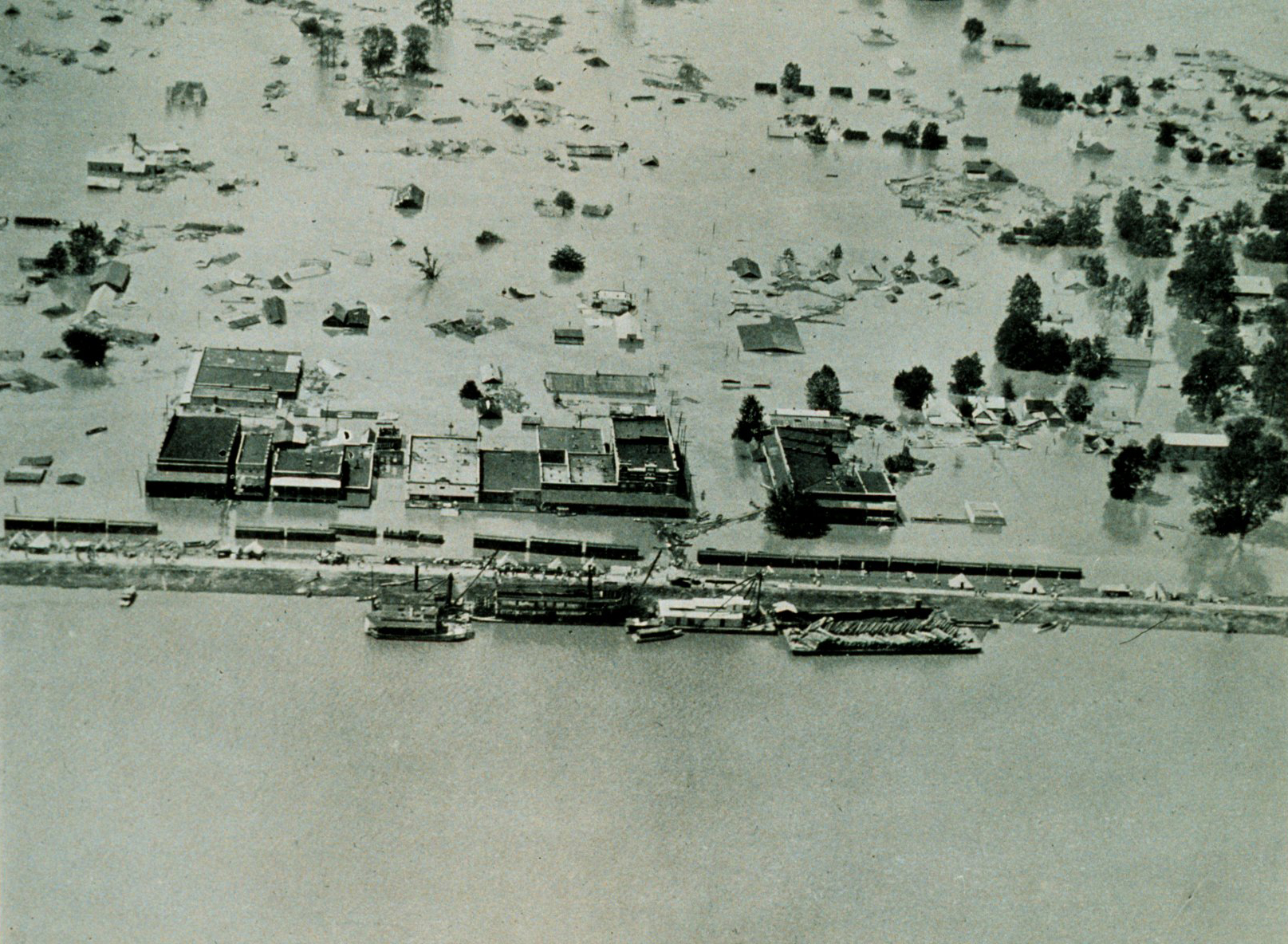
The Great Mississippi Flood of 1927, Arkansas City, Arkansas.

The 1927 flood was the greatest flood in modern history on the lower Mississippi River. In the summer of 1926 until the spring of 1927, heavy rains fell in eastern Kansas, Oklahoma, and the Ohio Valley. The White and Little Red rivers broke through the levees in Arkansas in February, flooding over 400 km^{2} (99,000 acres) with 3 to 5 m (9.8 to 16.4 ft) of water. The first levee break along the Mississippi River occurred a few miles south of Elaine, Arkansas, on March 29.

Over the next six weeks, numerous levees broke along the Mississippi River from Illinois to Louisiana, which inundated numerous towns in the Mississippi Valley. The break at Mounds Landing near Greenville, Mississippi, was the single greatest crevasse to ever occur along the Mississippi River. It flooded an area 80 km (50 mi) wide and 160 km (99 mi) long with up to 6 metres (20 ft) of water. Heavy spring rains caused a second major flood in the same region that June. In all, 73,500 km^{2} (28,400 sq mi) which were home to more than 931,000 people were inundated. To avoid flooding the city of New Orleans, the governor of Louisiana allowed engineers to create the Poydras cut, which saved the city but led to the flooding of St. Bernard and Plaquemines parishes instead. Millions of acres across seven states were flooded. Evacuees totaled 500,000. Economic losses were estimated at US$1 billion (1927 dollars), which was equivalent to almost one-third of the federal budget at that time.

== Great Flood of 1937 ==
The Ohio River flood of $500 million. The Birds Point-New Madrid Floodway was operated for the first time to reduce river stages along the Lower Ohio River and the reach of the Mississippi River adjacent to the floodway. The Bonnet Carre Spillway was opened for the first time and had 285 of the 350 bays opened for 48 days. New Orleans crested at 19.29 feet (5.88 m) on Feb 28th.

== Flood of 1945 ==
Flooding between March and May resulted in Baton Rouge reaching its second highest recorded crest at 45.18 feet (13.77 m) on April 29. The Bonnet Carre Spillway was opened for the second time for 57 days.

== Flood of 1965 ==
The spring 1965 flood on the Upper Mississippi is still the flood of record for from about 100 miles north of Minneapolis, Minnesota, to Hannibal, Missouri. The crests of that April exceeded previous records by several feet at many river gauge sites. Those record crests still exceed the second highest crest by a foot or more at many of those same sites. This flood caused $225 million in damage to public and private properties, with $173 million of that occurring along the main stem of the Mississippi River mid April through early May.

Many of the record crests from this flood still stand today. These include: 22.18 feet at Lake City, Minnesota, on April 19; 20.05 feet at Wabasha, Minnesota, on April 19; 20.77 feet at Winona, Minnesota, on April 19; 17.90 feet at La Crosse, Wisconsin, on April 21; 22.50 feet at Lansing, Iowa, on April 24; and 25.38 feet at McGregor, Iowa, on April 24. This also coincided with record high water on the tributary Minnesota River.

== Mississippi Flood of 1973 ==
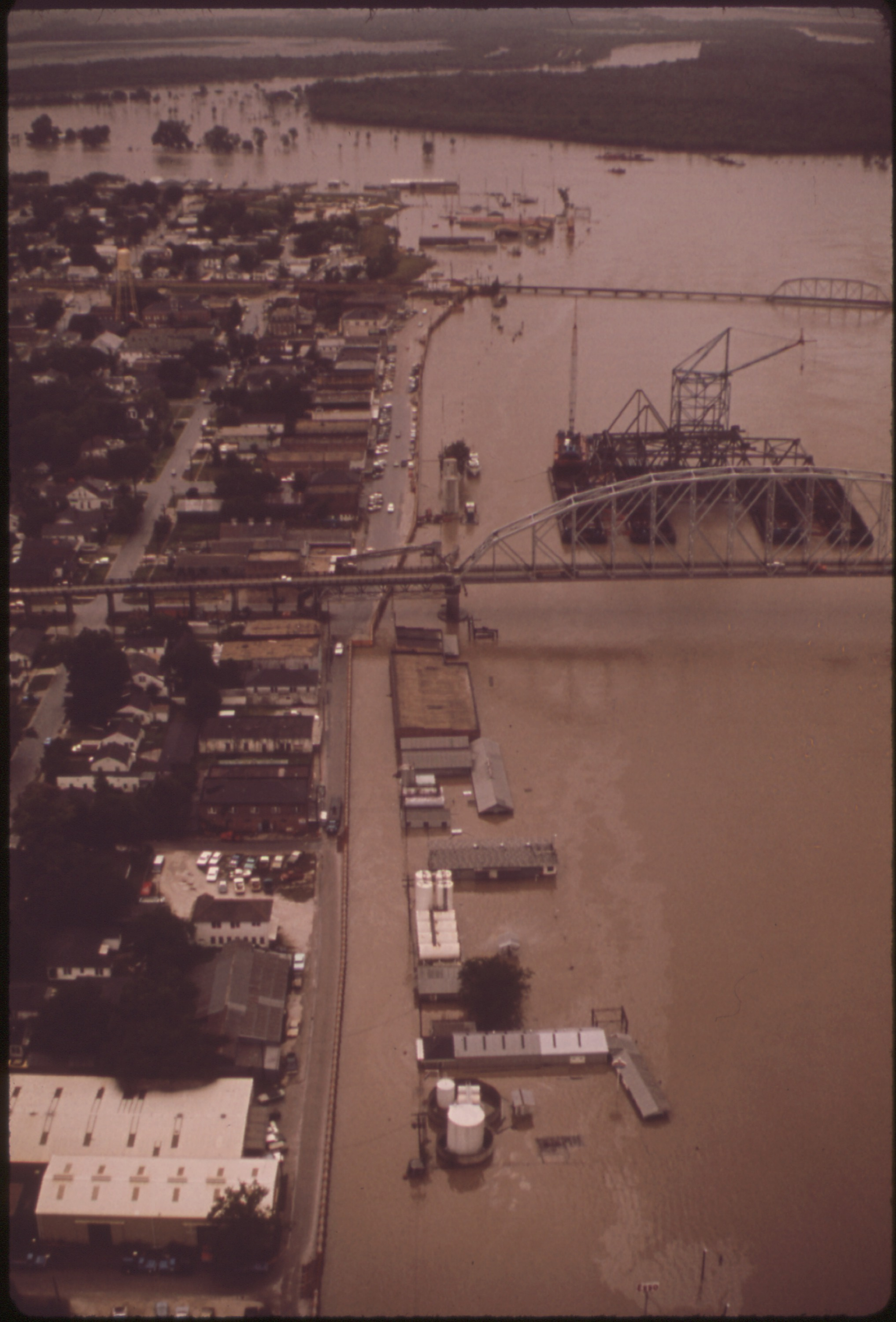
Aerial view of the flood waters in Morgan City, Louisiana May, 1973

The Mississippi Flood of 1973 occurred between March and May 1973 on the lower Mississippi River. The flood resulted in the largest volume of water to flow down the Mississippi since the Great Mississippi Flood of 1927. Both the Bonnet Carre Spillway and the Morganza Spillway were employed. The Bonnet Carre was fully opened between April 7 and June 14 for a record 75 days. The 1973 flood was the first time the Morganza Spillway was opened: from April 19 through June 13.

== Flood of 1975 ==
In April, 225 bays of the Bonnet Carre Spillway were opened for 15 days, the shortest duration on record. Reserve, Louisiana, had a crest of 24 feet (7.3 m) on April 14. the 8th highest on record.

== Flood of 1979 ==
April, all 350 bays of the Bonnet Carre Spillway were opened for 45 days. Red River Landing crested at 59.19 feet (18.04 m) on April 23.

== Lower Mississippi Flood of 1983 ==
The flood between May and June was the second most severe flood in the lower Mississippi Basin since 1927. Red River Landing, Louisiana, reached the 4th highest crest of record at 60.52 feet (18.45 m) on June 5 and was flooded for 115 days. All bays of the Bonnet Carre Spillway were opened for 35 days.

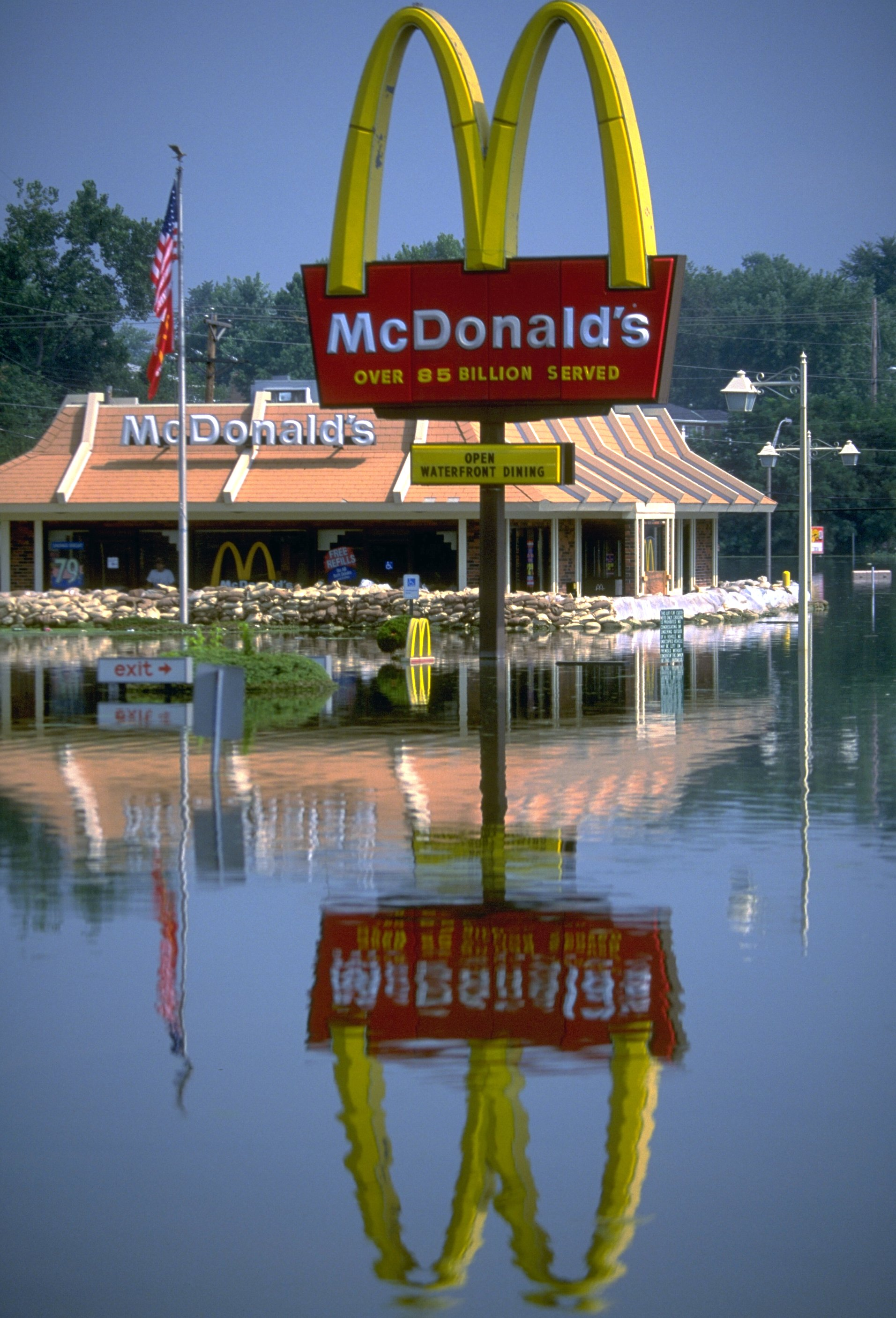
Great Flood of 1993, with the Mississippi River out of its banks in Festus, Missouri.

== Great Mississippi and Missouri Rivers Flood of 1993 ==
The flood occurred on the Mississippi and Missouri rivers and their tributaries between April and October 1993. The flooded area totaled around 30,000 square miles (78,000 km^{2}) and was the worst since the Great Mississippi Flood of 1927 as measured by duration, square miles inundated, persons displaced, crop and property damage and number of record river levels.

== Flood of 2002 ==
In April, Red River Landing reached 58.60 ft (17.86 m), the 8th highest crest on record.

== Flood of 2008 ==
Between April 11 and May 12, heavy rain in the Mississippi River Valley necessitated the opening of the Bonnet Carre Spillway for the first time in 11 years. 160 bays were opened for 31 days. Red River Landing crested at 60.68 feet (18.50 m) on April 24, the 3rd highest on record.

== Great Mississippi Flood of 2011 ==
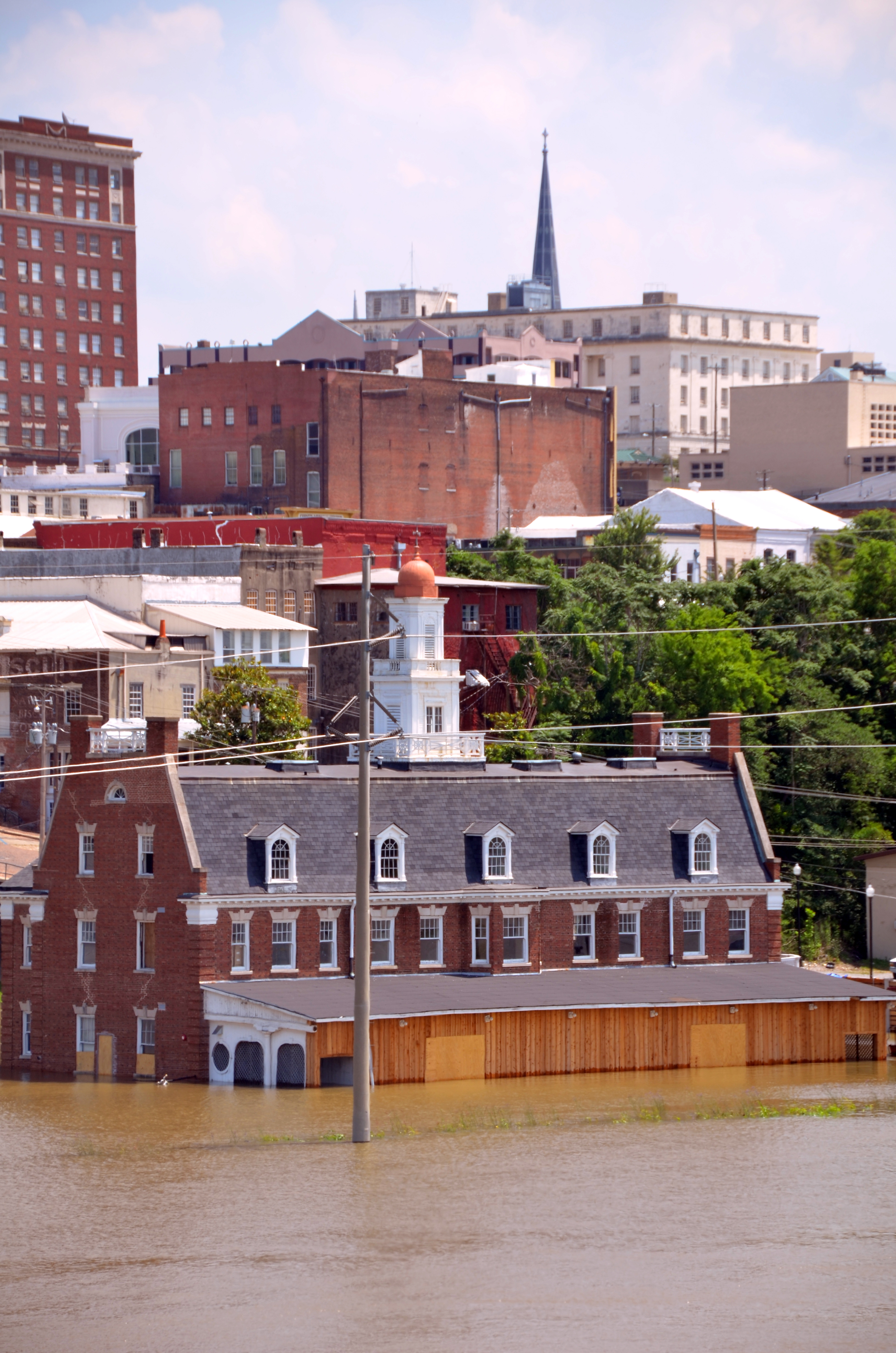
Old train depot along the Mississippi River in Vicksburg, Mississippi., May 13, 2011.

The Mississippi River floods in April and May 2011 were among the largest and most damaging along the U.S. waterway in the past century, rivalling major floods in 1927 and 1993. In April 2011, two major storm systems dumped record rainfall on the Mississippi River watershed. Rising from springtime snowmelt, the river and many of its tributaries began to swell to record levels by the beginning of May. Areas along the Mississippi itself experiencing flooding include Illinois, Iowa, Missouri, Kentucky, Tennessee, Arkansas, Mississippi, and Louisiana. U.S. President Barack Obama declared the western counties of Kentucky, Tennessee, and Mississippi federal disaster areas. The Birds Point-New Madrid Floodway was operated for a second time to reduce river stages along the Lower Ohio River and the reach of the Mississippi River adjacent to the floodway. For the second time in 38 years, the Morganza Spillway has been opened, deliberately flooding 4,600 square miles (12,000 km^{2}) of rural Louisiana to save most of Baton Rouge and New Orleans.

== Flood of 2014 ==
The Upper Mississippi River flooded in the summer of 2014 as the result of record rainfall in Minnesota, Iowa, Wisconsin and Illinois.

== 2017 flooding ==
The middle portion of the Mississippi approached historical record flooding. The National Weather Service anticipated a 48.5 ft. crest at Cape Girardeau, Missouri on May 5, 2017, which was within 6 inches of the January 2, 2016, crest of 48.86 ft.

== The Great flood of the Missouri and Mississippi Rivers 2019 ==
The Mississippi river floods to levels similar to the 1993 Great Mississippi and Missouri Floods in Davenport, Iowa. Four people have been reported dead as of May 3, 2019.

== See also ==
- Floods in the United States
