= Birds Point-New Madrid Floodway =

River diversion for the Mississippi River in Missouri, U.S.

Coordinates: 36°42′N 89°18′W

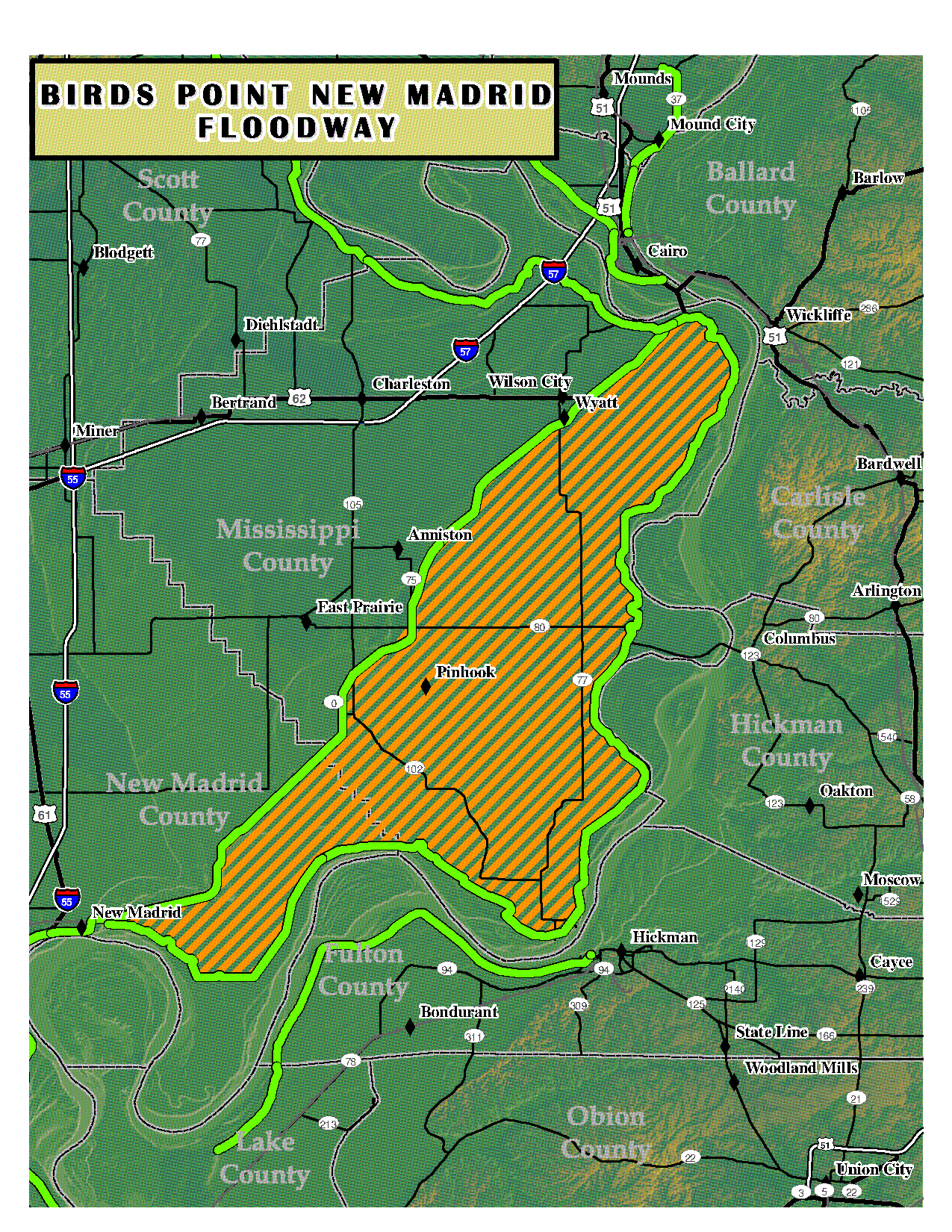
Map of the Birds Point-New Madrid Floodway

The Birds Point-New Madrid Floodway is a flood control component of the Mississippi River and Tributaries Project located on the west bank of the Mississippi River in southeast Missouri just below the confluence of the Ohio and Mississippi Rivers. The construction of the floodway was authorized by the Flood Control Act of 1928 and later modified by the Flood Control Act of 1965. Its purpose is to divert water from the Mississippi River during major flood events and lower the flood stages upstream, notably at Cairo, Illinois.

The floodway has been the focus of legal opposition by residents and landowners since its inception.

== History ==
After the Great Mississippi Flood of 1927, the engineering policy on the Mississippi River changed from building levees high enough to withstand the greatest recorded flood to include floodways. The Flood Control Act of 1928 authorized the United States Army Corps of Engineers to construct the Birds Point-New Madrid Floodway in Missouri and the Morganza Spillway and Bonnet Carre Spillway in Louisiana.

Even before its authorization, the Birds Point-New Madrid Floodway was the subject of controversy. In June 1927, President Calvin Coolidge instructed the Mississippi River Commission and the Corps of Engineers to develop a plan to protect the Mississippi alluvial valley from future floods. The Commission recommended four floodways below the mouth of the Arkansas River and, above, stronger and higher levees set back from the channel. Chief of Engineers Maj. Gen. Edgar Jadwin rejected the costly plan and submitted one of his own. Jadwin's plan included the Birds Point-New Madrid floodway with a setback levee between 3 and 10 miles (4.8–16.1 km) from the existing mainline levee. Eleven miles of the mainline levee were to be lowered by 3 feet 6 inches (1.07 m) to create a fuse plug levee. At a flood stage of 55 feet (17 m) on the Cairo gage, the levee would overtop and crevasse to divert water to the floodway.

The Flood Control Act of 1928 adopted the Jadwin plan for the Birds Point-New Madrid Floodway and included a provision for compensation of landowners within the floodway. President Coolidge authorized a one-time indemnity paid to landowners to flood their land and the purchase of the land adjacent to the upper fuse-plug of the frontline levee. The authorization stipulated that the fuseplug was not to be constructed until at least half of the flowage rights had been secured.

[My constituents] do not want to see southeast Missouri made the dumping ground to protect Cairo, much as we love Cairo.

— Rep. Dewey Jackson Short,

Construction was scheduled to begin in the summer of 1929, but landowner George W. Kirk filed a lawsuit maintaining that he would be unable to sell his land or secure loans as a result of the floodway. Judge Charles B. Davis of the United States District Court for the Eastern District of Missouri ruled in favor of the government and denied an injunction. Construction of the setback levee started in October 1929 and was completed in October 1932. Acquisition of the required flowage rights was not accomplished until January 1942.

The Watershed Protection and Flood Prevention Act of 1954 authorized the construction of a new levee to project grade extending across the 1,500-foot (460 m) gap at the lower end of the frontline levee. However, the inability of the St. John Levee and Drainage District to obtain the necessary easements has prevented the Corps of Engineers from initiating the project.

The Flood Control Act of 1965 authorized the increase of the frontline levee to 62 feet (19 m) on the Cairo gage and the fuseplug sections to 60 feet (18 m). The Mississippi River Commission further modified the plan to raise the fuseplug sections to 60 feet 6 inches (18.44 m), the frontline levee to 62 feet 6 inches (19.05 m), and the mainline levee to 65 feet 6 inches (19.96 m) on the Cairo gage. The plan called for the use of explosives on the upper fuseplug section if the River reached 58 feet (18 m) at Cairo and was forecast to exceed 60 feet (18 m)

After the floods of 1973, 1975, and 1979, the Mississippi River Commission again revised its plan to include four artificial crevasses: two at the upper fuseplug, one at the lower fuseplug, and one on the frontline levee opposite Hickman, Kentucky. The use of explosives was expanded to all four fuseplugs. The Mississippi River Commission and the Corps of Engineers later realized that they did not have sufficient property rights to access the levee to place and detonate explosives. In 1981, the Mississippi River Commission Memphis District commander requested entry permission from the St. John Levee and Drainage District and Levee District No. 3 of Mississippi County, Missouri, but the request was refused.

Following the 1983 flood, a 2 1/2-mile (4.0 km) section of the upper fuseplug and 1 1/2-mile (2.4 km) section of the lower fuseplug were raised and embedded with sections of polyethylene pipe to be filled with liquid explosives and detonated when the Cairo flood stage reached 61 feet (19 m).

A 1990 Corps of Engineers study of alternatives to the floodway recommended a number of improvements in the floodway, but these were not authorized by Congress.

== Design and operation ==
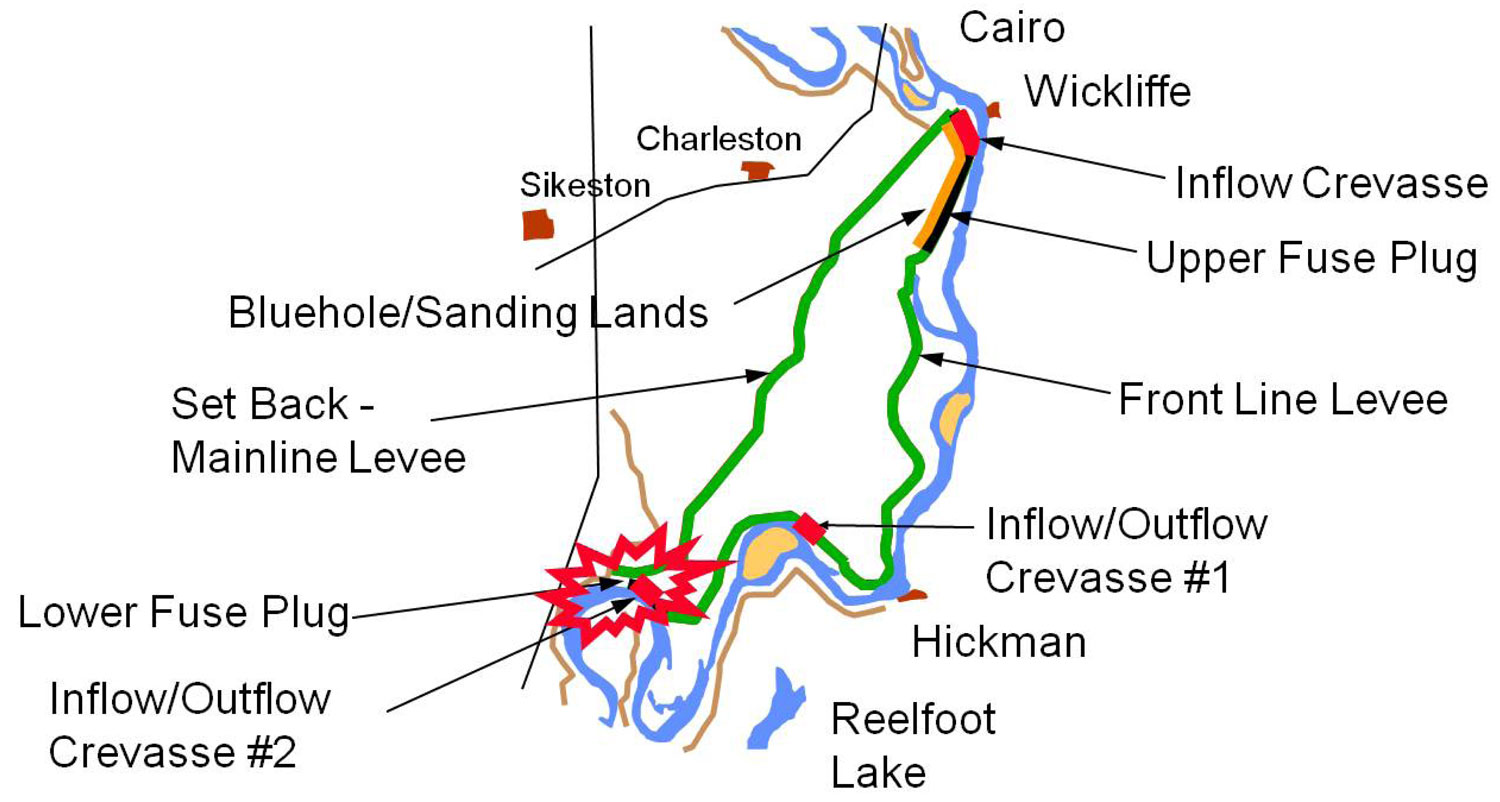
Birds Point-New Madrid Floodway levees.

The purpose of the floodway is to reduce flooding at and above Cairo, Illinois, and along the east bank levee opposite the floodway during a major flood. The floodway is between 3 miles (4.8 km) and 15 miles (24 km) wide and is bounded on the east by the 56 miles (90 km) frontline levee between Bird's Point, Missouri and New Madrid, Missouri and on the west by a 36 miles (58 km) setback levee. The area within the floodway is approximately 130,000 acres (530 km^{2}). The frontline and setback levees end near New Madrid but do not connect, leaving a 1,500-foot (460 m) gap that functions as a drainage outlet. The gap also permits backwater flooding in the lower portion of the floodway.

The floodway is designed to divert 550,000 cu ft/s (16,000 m^{3}/s) from the Mississippi River during the "project design flood" hypothetical flood event. At this flow the level of the Mississippi River will drop 7 feet (2.1 m) at Cairo. Unlike the Morganza and Bonnet Carre Spillways in Louisiana, the Birds Point-New Madrid Floodway does not have floodgates. The floodway is operated by a controlled destruction of the levee, either with explosives or by overtopping. The frontline levee has an 11 miles (18 km) fuseplug section of the upper levee and a 5 miles (8.0 km) section at the lower levee that are lower than adjacent sections. The operation of the floodway is directed by the president of the Mississippi River Commission after consultation with the Chief of Engineers.

== Flood events ==
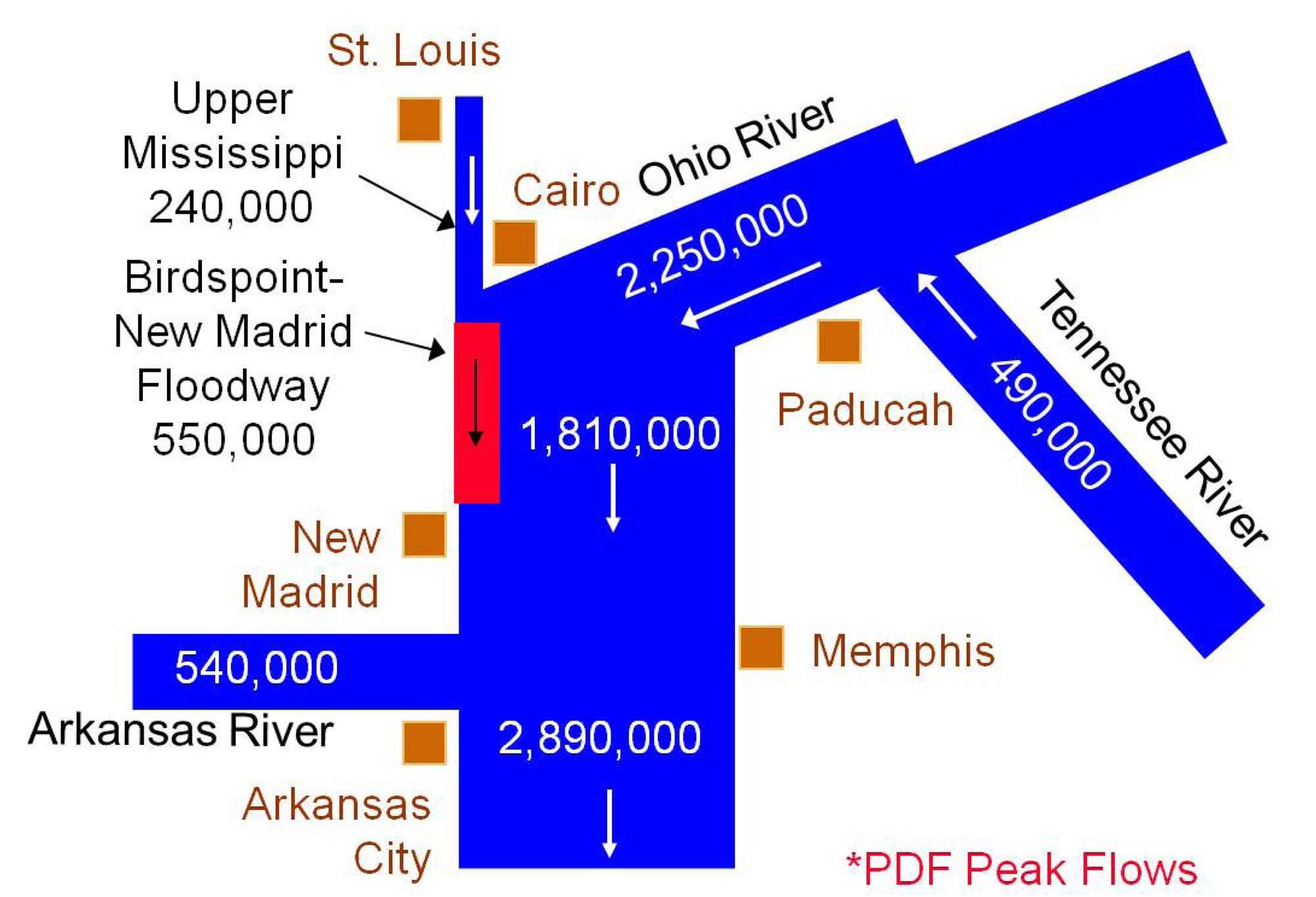
Project design flood flows for the Birds Point-New Madrid Floodway.

=== 1937 activation of the floodway ===
The first activation of the floodway was in January 1937. The river over-topped the levee, but did not erode it enough to activate the floodway. Dynamite was used to destroy the levee and activate the system. The Corps rebuilt the levee back to the original standards and it was left untouched until 1983. In 1983 they upgraded the levee to what is known as a "fuse-plug design". They laid 11,000 feet (3,400 m) of pipe that they can fill with liquid explosives and detonate to open the levee and activate the floodway.

=== 2011 activation of the floodway ===
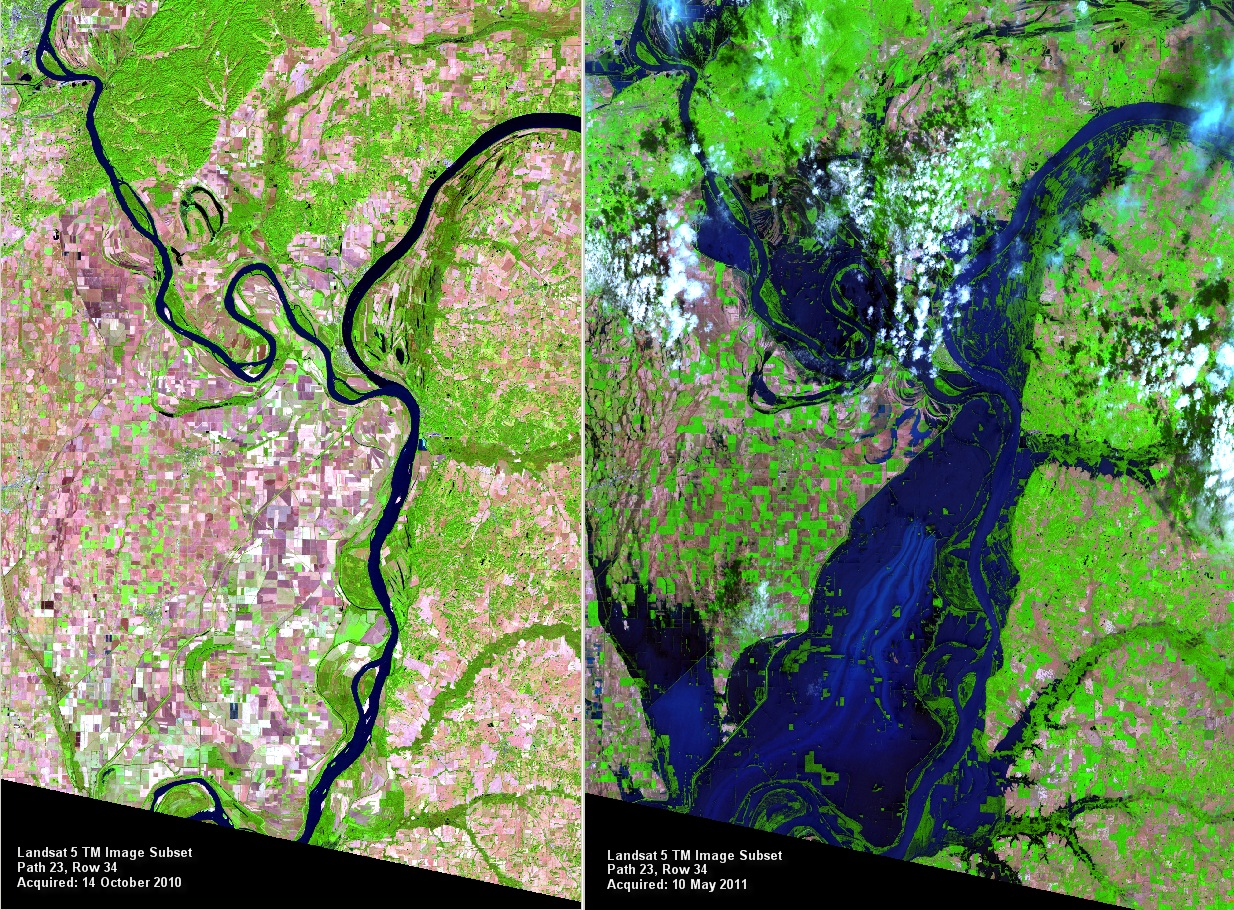
Landsat 5 image of floodway activation, May 2011.

The second time the floodway was activated was on May 2, 2011. Both the Ohio and Upper Mississippi rivers were experiencing an unprecedented amount of flooding. The gauge at Cairo on May 2 was over 61 feet 6 inches (18.75 m), the level at which the floodway is to be activated. The river levels had already prompted a mandatory evacuation of all but 100 citizens in Cairo due to the extreme high water and concern that the flood control system protecting Cairo would fail. The first of three detonations took place in the late evening of May 2, and the following detonations were planned for May 3. Activation of the floodway resulted in the flooding of the village of Pinhook, Missouri. Due to the limited warning the village received, most of the residents lost their homes and possessions, and were unable to return and the village was abandoned.

The state of Missouri attempted to halt the activation of the floodway by litigation (Missouri v. U.S. Army Corps of Engineers), because of the disparate impact of the action upon affected Missouri residents and property owners, but were not able to halt the action.

== Controversy ==
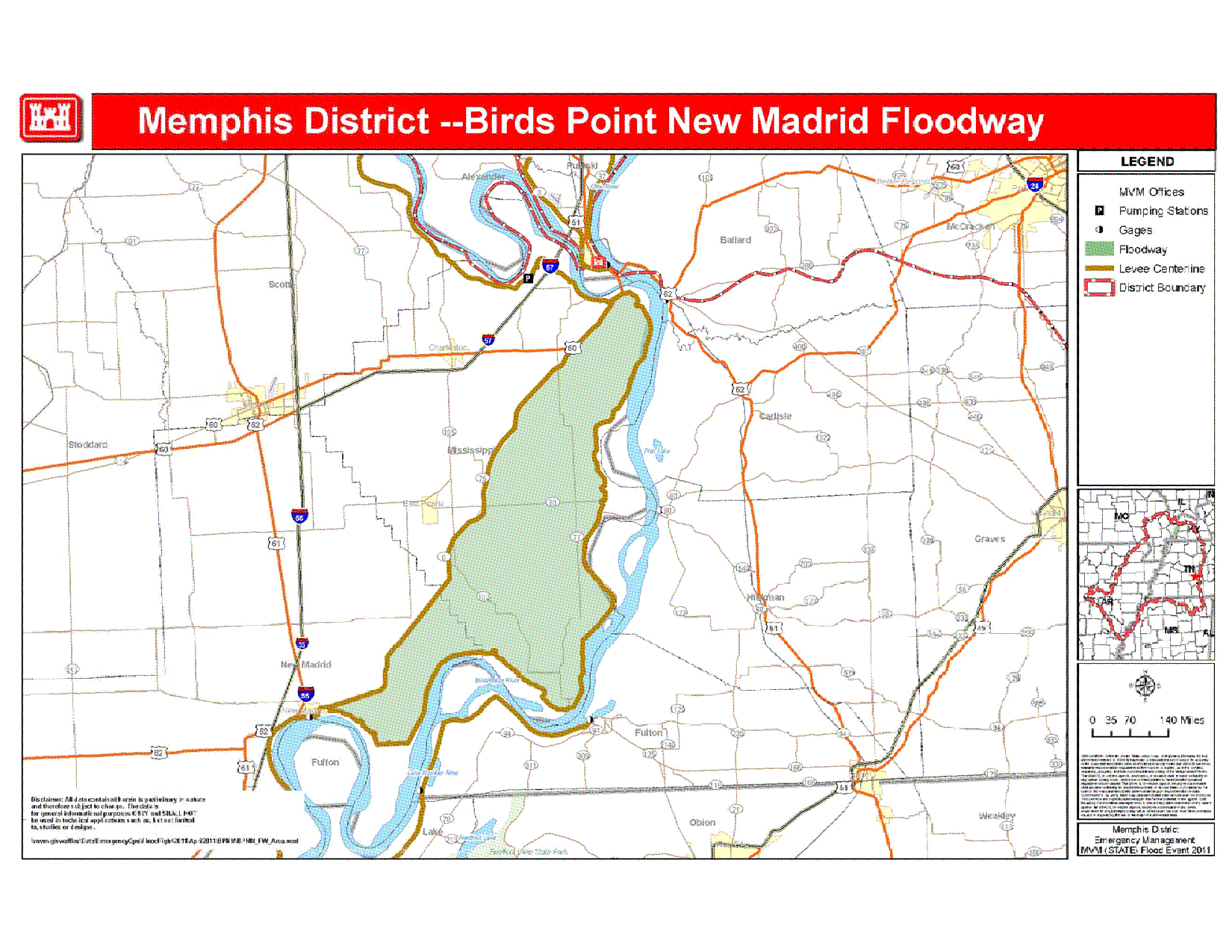
New Madrid Floodway map (source: USACE)

The U.S. Army Corps of Engineers contends that the program is vital to the actual and economic survival of the region.

Opponents of the plans, such as The Missouri Coalition for the Environment say it will not address the flooding problem, but instead, will only destroy fish habitat.

On average, the Mississippi River floods Mississippi County, MO & New Madrid County, MO once every three years; or, a total of 16 times over the past 45. In the spring of 2002, flooding covered over 77,400 acres (313 km^{2}) in the New Madrid Floodway, destroying 48,700 acres (197 km^{2}) of crops.

The flood damage, the United States Department of Agriculture says, could have been greatly limited had the Floodway Project been completed. According to the U.S. Fish & Wildlife Service, however, the plan is unworkable; or per Senator John McCain's recitation of an earlier article in The Washington Post, "absolutely ridiculous".

U.S. Rep. Jo Ann Emerson, R-MO, who represents the bootheel region in Missouri's Eighth Congressional District, sees it differently: "Flood protection is a necessity.... Last year, [100,000 acres (400 km^{2}) were flooded, and] nearly 50,000 acres (200 km^{2}) of crops were destroyed. Farmers cannot afford to sustain these preventable annual losses.".

=== St. John's Bayou-New Madrid floodway ===
The Water Resources Development Act of 1986 authorized the St. John's Bayou-New Madrid Floodway project to augment the 1954 authorization to close the 1,500 feet (460 m) gap in the frontline levee and construct two pumping stations. The goal was to reduce backwater flooding at the lower end of the floodway. A 2004 lawsuit by the Environmental Defense Fund and the National Wildlife Federation resulted in an injunction that halted the work.

On September 19, 2007, U.S. District Court for the District of Columbia dealt a major blow to the $107 million St. John's Bayou/New Madrid Floodway Project. In ordering a halt to the floodwall's construction, Judge James Robertson said the Corps had improperly manipulated its habitat models to make it seem that the project's environmental impacts would be "compliant with the Clean Water Act and the National Environmental Policy Act, when it is not." He further ordered that the already completed work on the project, tallied at $7 million, be undone.

The decision came after environmentalist groups argued that the Clean Water Act and the National Environmental Policy Act were being violated in the name of agrarian prosperity; and that the Floodway project would create no possible human benefit.

"That's a bunch of nonsense," says one local official, "They can say what they want, but they don't live here."

Emerson called the judge's ruling "a pause before we move forward..."
