= Lower Mississippi River =

Downstream portion of the Mississippi river

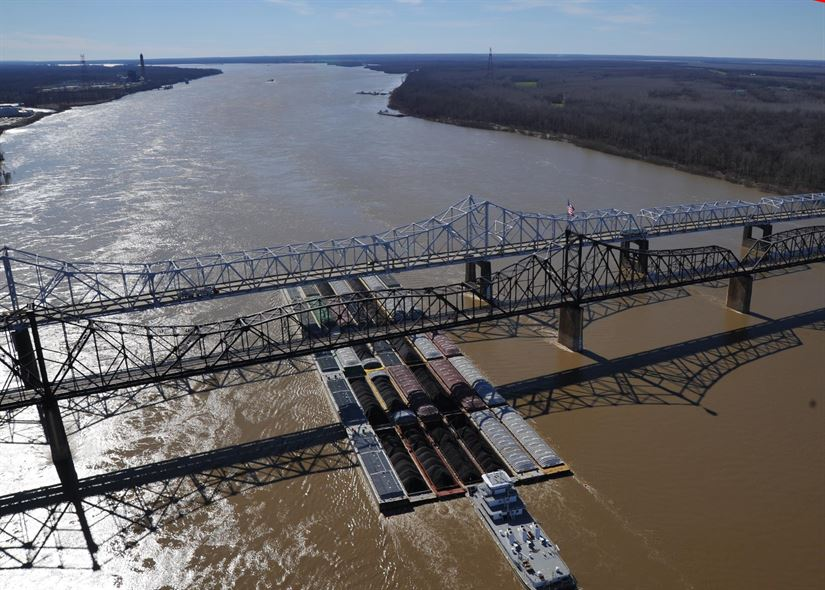
- 35 barges passing under the Vicksburg Bridge by Vicksburg, Miss.

Location
- Country: US

Physical characteristics
- Source
  - location: Cairo, Illinois (confluence of Ohio River and the Middle Mississippi River)
  - elevation: 315 ft (96 m)
- Mouth
  - location: Gulf of Mexico
- Length: 1,600 km (990 mi)

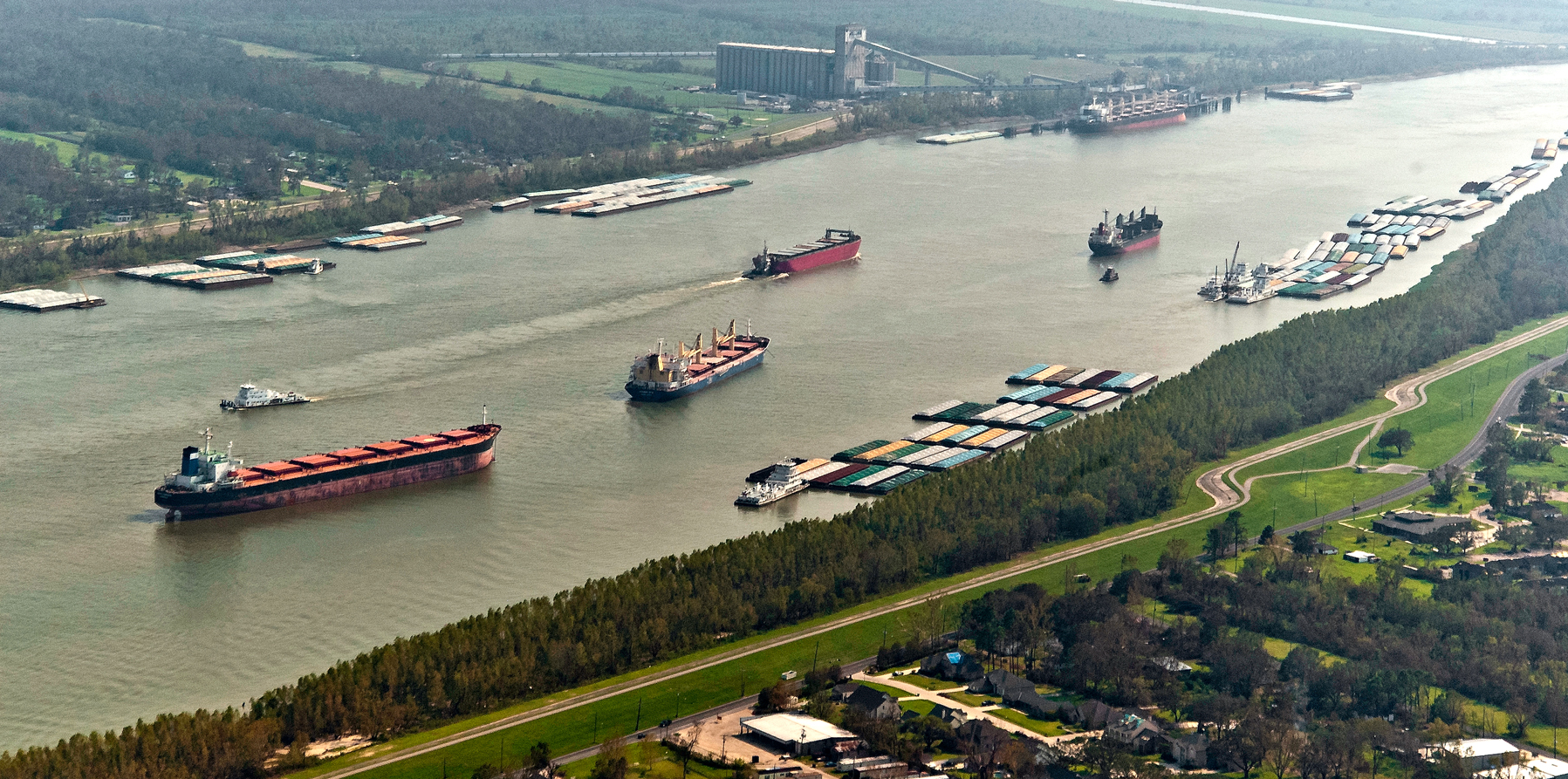
The Lower Mississippi from New Orleans to Baton Rouge is navigable by large ships.

The Lower Mississippi River is the portion of the Mississippi River downstream of Cairo, Illinois. From the confluence of the Ohio River and the Middle Mississippi River at Cairo, the Lower flows just under 1000 miles (1600 km) to the Gulf of Mexico. It is the most heavily travelled component of the Mississippi River System.

== Structures ==
Unlike on the upper rivers, there are no locks or dams on the Lower Mississippi. The river is, however, constrained by levees and dikes to control flooding and secure a navigation channel for barges. The Old River Control Structure, the Bonnet Carré Spillway, the Mississippi River – Gulf Outlet Canal and other man-made structures on the lower reaches of the river seek to manipulate the flow of water in the vicinity of New Orleans.

== History ==
The political and engineering focus in the 20th century was to separate the Lower Mississippi River from its floodplain. Levees and channelization—along with substantial loss of bottomland forests to agriculture in the alluvial valley—have resulted in a loss of wildlife and fish habitat, decreased water quality, and an expansion of the hypoxic zone in the Gulf of Mexico. Agricultural runoff has resulted in increased turbidity, siltation, pollution from pesticides, toxicity to aquatic organisms, oxygen depletion and eutrophication.

== Navigation ==
Channel depth of 9 feet is maintained by the Corps of Engineers from St. Louis, Missouri to Baton Rouge, Louisiana.

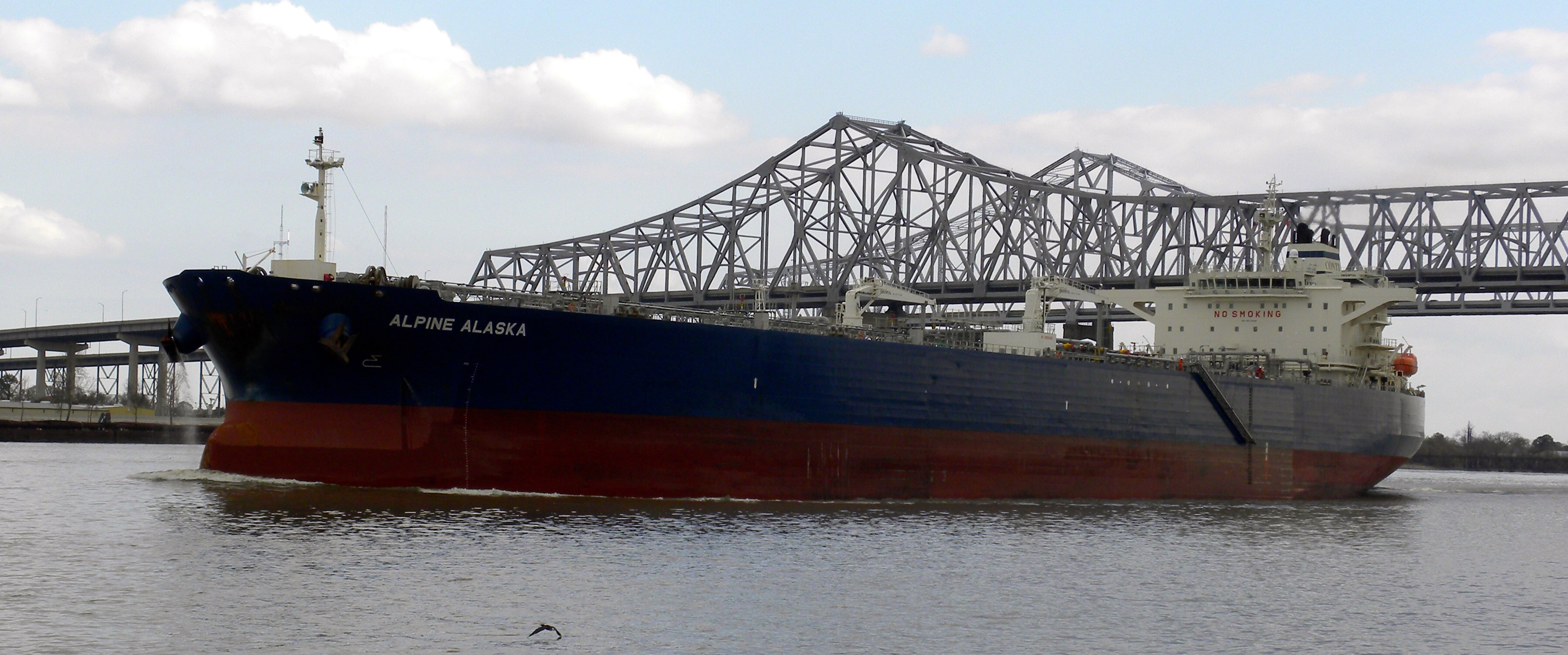
Oil tanker on the Lower Mississippi

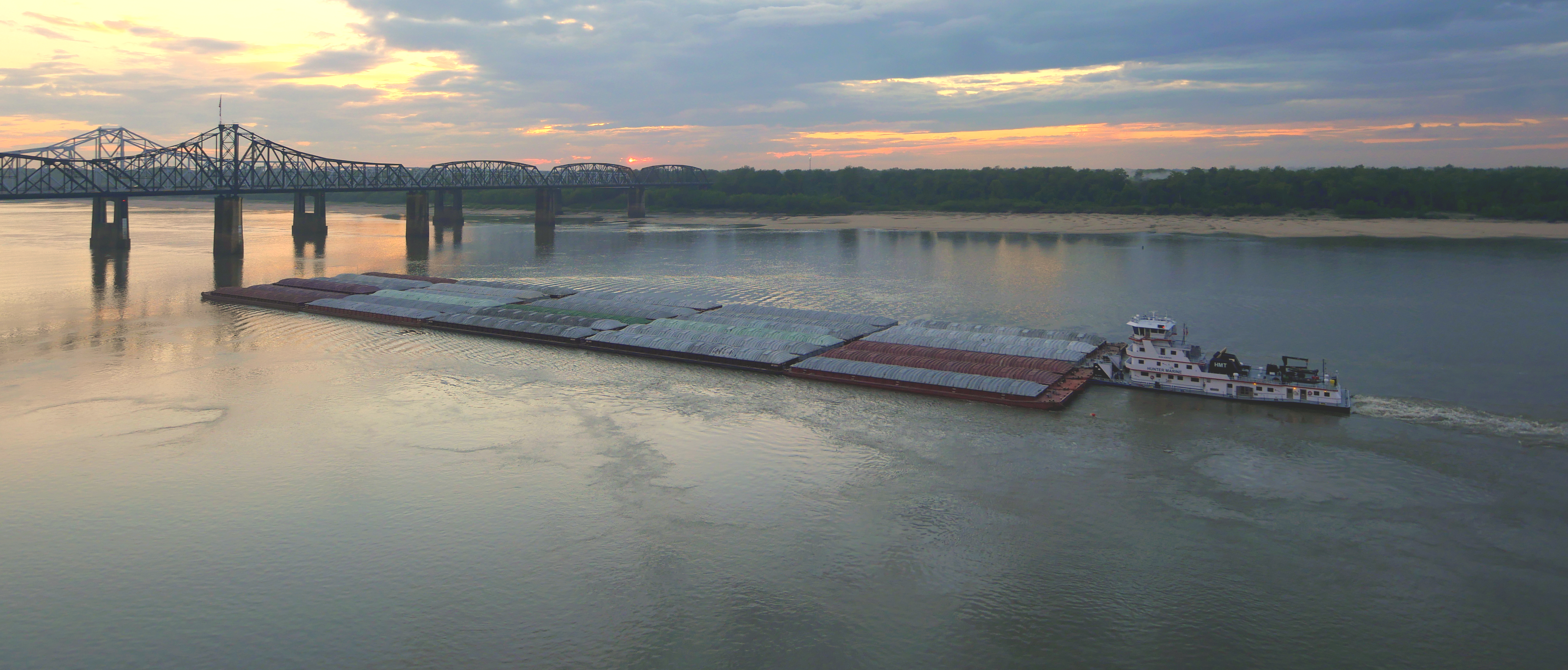
Lower Mississippi River barge

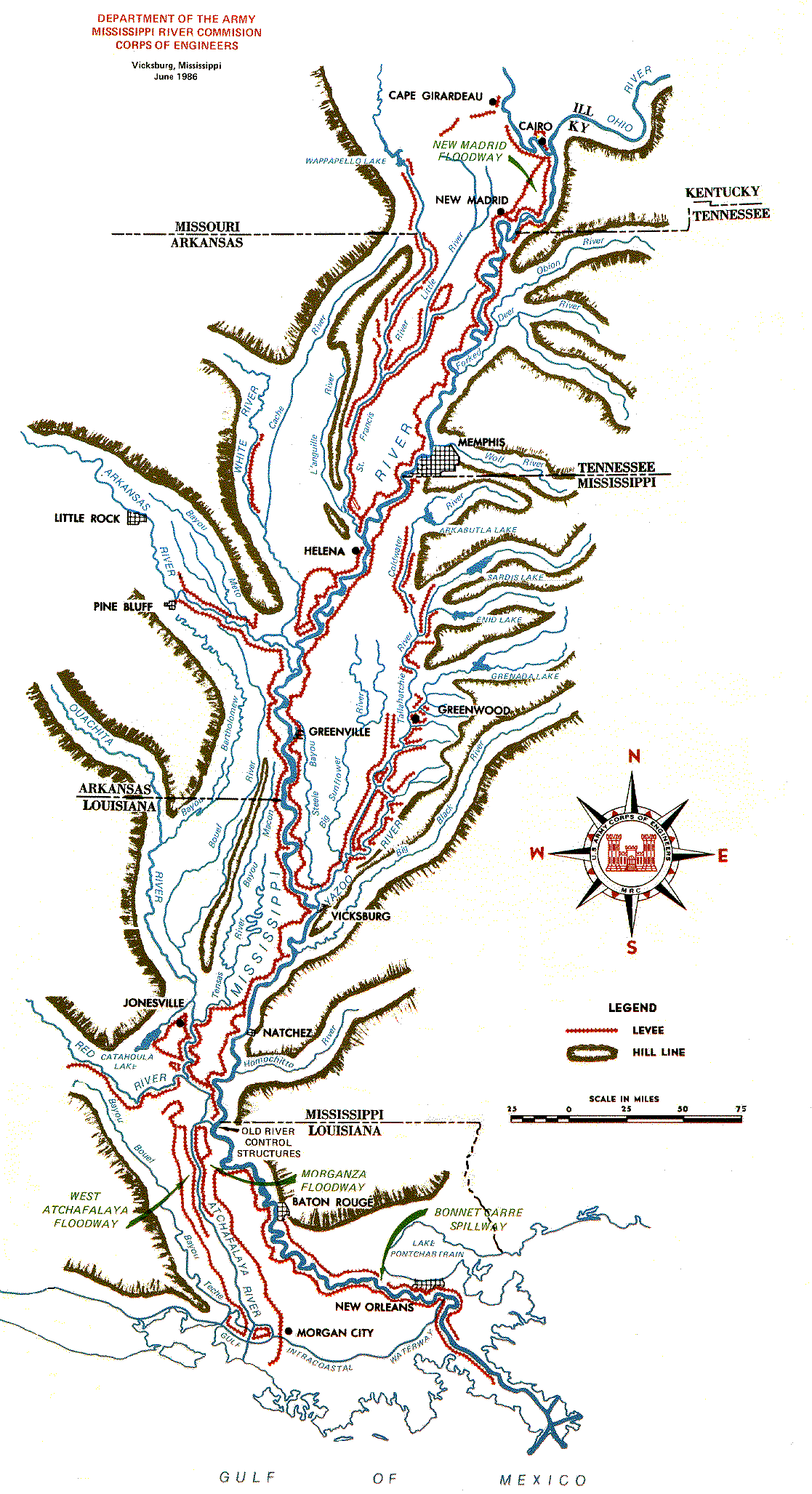
Levees on the Lower Mississippi River.

On the Lower Mississippi, from Baton Rouge to the Gulf, the navigation depth is 45 feet, allowing for container ships and cruise ships to dock at the Port of New Orleans and bulk cargo ships shorter than 150 foot air draft to fit under the Huey P. Long Bridge and traverse the Mississippi to Baton Rouge. There is a feasibility study to dredge this portion of the river to 50 feet to allow New Panamax ship depths.

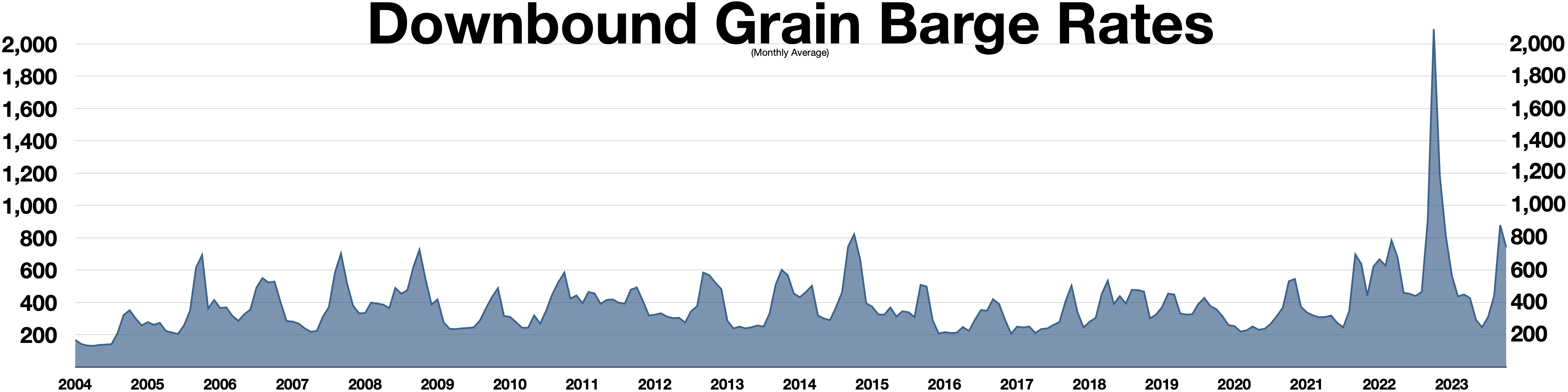
Downbound barge rates In late 2022, low water levels in the Lower Mississippi River caused two backups that held up over 100 tow boats with 2,000 barge units, causing barge rates to soar

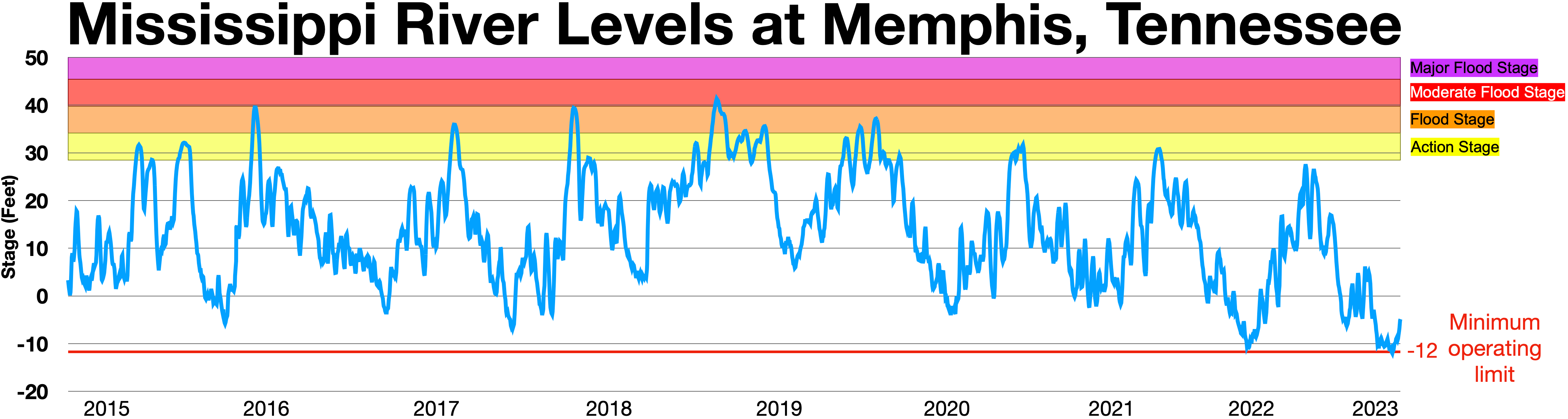
Mississippi River levels at Memphis, Tennessee Major flood stage Moderate flood stage Flood stage Action stage River levels Minimum operating limit (-12 feet)

== See also ==
- List of crossings of the Lower Mississippi River
- 2011 Mississippi River floods
- Upper Mississippi River
