= Red River Landing, Louisiana =

Coordinates: 30°57′34″N 91°39′54″W

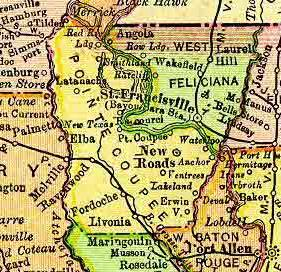
1895 map of Pointe Coupee Parish showing location of Red River Landing

Red River Landing was the name of a community located in northern Pointe Coupee Parish, Louisiana, United States. The community was located near the Red River and the Mississippi River, adjacent to the current location of Louisiana State Penitentiary.

The U.S. Army Corps of Engineers maintains a river-monitoring gauge at this location, approximately 5 miles (8 km) downstream of the Old River Control Structure.

== History ==
In 1836, a post office was established at Red River Point in northern Pointe Coupee Parish. This area was once a major economic point and the transfer point for all immigration and mail. Before the advent of the railroads, daily stages ran from this community to Shreveport, Louisiana. However, after the old railroad bridge collapsed, the once thriving community began to decline steadily. In 1902, the post office was changed to Torras, after Joseph Torras, whose son-in-law, N. P. Phillips, founded the area.
