= Edward Honor =

American Army general

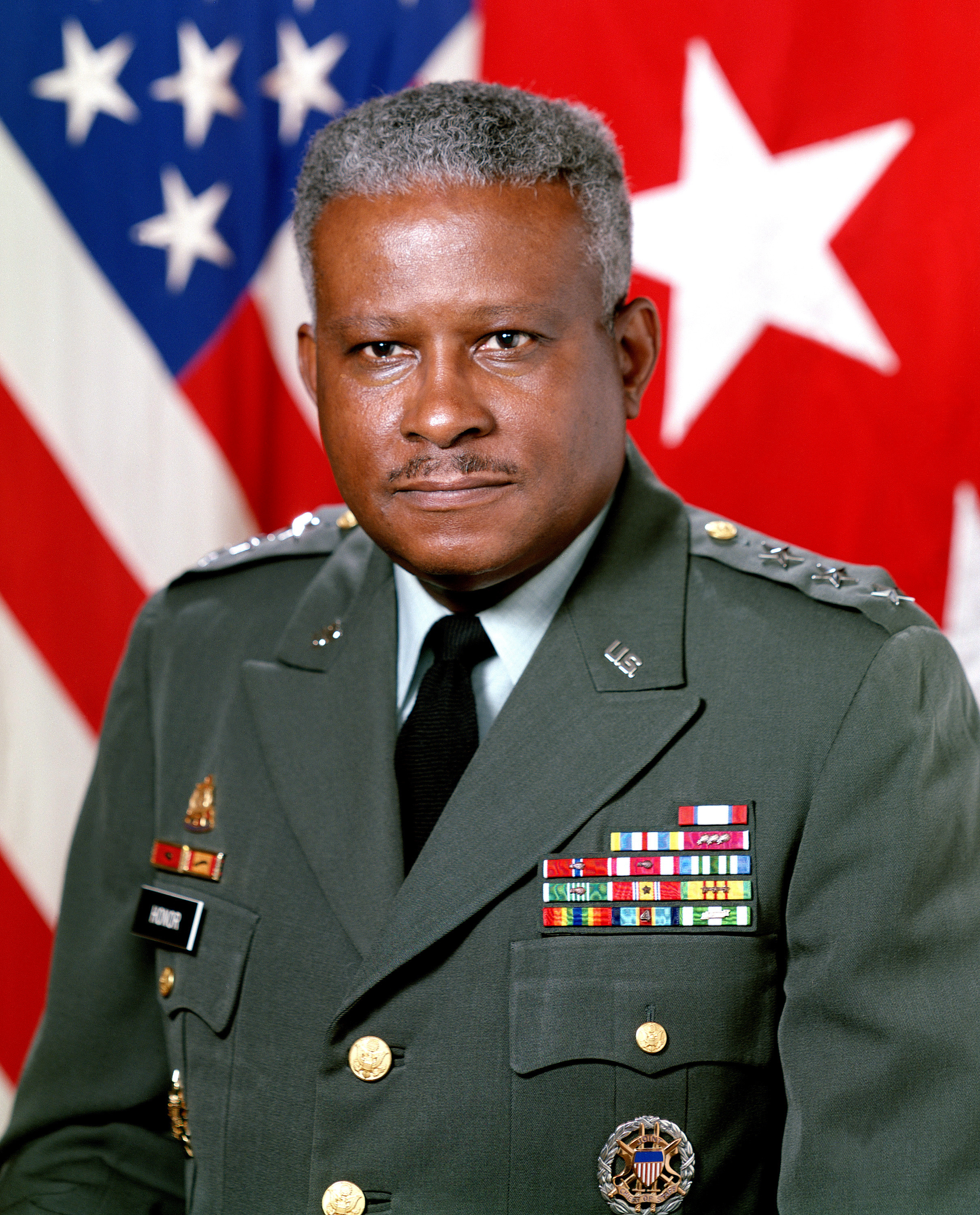
- Born: 17 March 1933; Melville, Louisiana
- Died: 3 September 2008 (aged 75); Washington, D.C.
- Military career
- Allegiance: United States
- Branch: United States Army
- Service years: 1954–1989
- Rank: Lieutenant General
- Commands: Military Traffic Management Command; Military Traffic Management Command, Transportation Terminal Group-Europe; 37th Transportation Group, 4th Transportation Brigade; 24th Transportation Battalion, 124th Transportation Command; 36th Transportation Battalion, 124th Transportation Command
- Conflicts: Vietnam War
- Awards: Defense Distinguished Service Medal; Army Distinguished Service Medal; Defense Superior Service Medal; Legion of Merit (4); Bronze Star Medal (2); Meritorious Service Medal (2)

Edward Honor Sr. (17 March 1933 – 3 September 2008) was a lieutenant general in the United States Army who served as Director of Logistics (J4) on the Joint Staff from 1987 to 1989. Promoted to brigadier general in 1979, he was the first African-American general officer in the Army Transportation Corps.

== Early life and education ==
Born in Melville, Louisiana, Honor attended Southern University and A&M College where he joined Alpha Phi Alpha and Army ROTC. He earned a B.A. degree in education in 1954.

== Military career ==
During the Vietnam War, Honor assumed command of the 36th Transportation Battalion in July 1969 and the 24th Transportation Battalion in December 1969, both of which were part of the 124th Transportation Command at Cam Ranh Bay. He later commanded the 37th Transportation Group in Germany, Military Traffic Management Command at Transportation Terminal Group-Europe in Rotterdam from 1983 to 1984 and then all of Military Traffic Management Command from 1986 to 1987.

Honor was a co-founder of the African-American military officer mentoring group The Rocks in 1974. He was promoted to major general in 1984 and lieutenant general in 1987.

== Later career ==
After his retirement from active duty in 1989, Honor served as president of the National Defense Transportation Association until 2002.

== Personal ==
Honor was the son of Louis and Doretha "Retha" (Jackson) Honor.

Honor married Phyllis Virginia Whitehurst (born 24 June 1945) on 13 August 1978 in Alexandria, Virginia. His second marriage to Harlean Redell Copeland (born 27 August 1936) had ended in divorce in July 1968, and his second wife had remarried in April 1974. Honor had a son Edward Jr., daughter Beverly Ann, and three grandchildren from his three marriages.

After his death, Honor was interred at Arlington National Cemetery on 1 December 2008.
