= Melville, Louisiana =

- Town
- Town of Melville
- Location of Melville in St. Landry Parish, Louisiana.

- Location of Louisiana in the United States
- Coordinates: 30°41′27″N 91°45′10″W
- Country: United States
- State: Louisiana
- Parish: St. Landry

Area
  - Total: 1.29 sq mi (3.33 km^{2})
  - Land: 1.25 sq mi (3.25 km^{2})
  - Water: 0.031 sq mi (0.08 km^{2})
- Elevation: 30 ft (9.1 m)

Population (2020)
  - Total: 759
  - Density: 605/sq mi (233.4/km^{2})
- Time zone: UTC-6 (CST)
  - Summer (DST): UTC-5 (CDT)
- Area code: 337
- FIPS code: 22-49730
- GNIS feature ID: 2406144
- Website: www.melvillela.com

Melville is a town in St. Landry Parish, Louisiana, United States. As of the 2020 census, Melville had a population of 759. It is part of the Opelousas−Eunice Micropolitan Statistical Area. It was founded in 1889 and is known as the Atchafalaya River Catfish Capital of Louisiana. It is directly across the river from the ghost town Red Cross, Louisiana.

== Geography ==
According to the United States Census Bureau, the town has a total area of 1.3 sq mi (3.3 km^{2}), all but 0.039 sq mi (0.1 km^{2}) (2.34%) of which is land.

It is mostly flat land surrounded by a ring levee to protect it from flooding from the Atchafalaya River and the West Atchafalaya Floodway.

=== Climate ===
Climate data for Melville, Louisiana
Month	Jan	Feb	Mar	Apr	May	Jun	Jul	Aug	Sep	Oct	Nov	Dec	Year
Mean daily maximum °C (°F)	17 (63)	18 (65)	22 (72)	26 (79)	29 (85)	33 (91)	33 (92)	33 (92)	31 (88)	27 (81)	22 (72)	18 (64)	26 (79)
Mean daily minimum °C (°F)	4 (40)	6 (43)	10 (50)	13 (56)	17 (63)	21 (69)	22 (72)	22 (71)	19 (66)	13 (55)	8 (46)	5 (41)	13 (56)
Average precipitation mm (inches)	140 (5.4)	120 (4.9)	130 (5.0)	130 (5.3)	130 (5.2)	100 (4.1)	130 (5.1)	110 (4.5)	99 (3.9)	74 (2.9)	110 (4.2)	150 (5.9)	1,430 (56.4)
Source: Weatherbase

== Demographics ==
Historical population
Census	Pop.	Note	%±
1890	361		—
1900	517		43.2%
1910	1,093		111.4%
1920	958		−12.4%
1930	1,541		60.9%
1940	1,828		18.6%
1950	1,901		4.0%
1960	1,939		2.0%
1970	1,987		2.5%
1980	1,764		−11.2%
1990	1,562		−11.5%
2000	1,376		−11.9%
2010	1,041		−24.3%
2020	759		−27.1%
2025 (est.)	735	▼	−3.2%
U.S. Decennial Census

As of the 2010 United States census, there were 1,041 people living in the town. The racial makeup of the town was 51.9% Black, 45.0% White, 0.2% Native American, 0.2% Asian and 1.0% from two or more races. 1.8% were Hispanic or Latino of any race.

As of the census of 2000, there were 1,376 people, 542 households, and 363 families living in the town. The population density was 1,098 inhabitants per square mile (424/km^{2}). There were 648 housing units at an average density of 517 per square mile (200/km^{2}). The racial makeup of the town was 52.47% White, 45.78% African American, 0.87% Asian, and 0.87% from two or more races. Hispanic or Latino of any race were 1.74% of the population.

There were 542 households, out of which 32.3% had children under the age of 18 living with them, 40.6% were married couples living together, 20.8% had a female householder with no husband present, and 33.0% were non-families. 31.0% of all households were made up of individuals, and 15.3% had someone living alone who was 65 years of age or older. The average household size was 2.54 and the average family size was 3.17.

In the town, the population was spread out, with 29.9% under the age of 18, 8.9% from 18 to 24, 24.3% from 25 to 44, 23.2% from 45 to 64, and 13.7% who were 65 years of age or older. The median age was 35 years. For every 100 females, there were 83.5 males. For every 100 females age 18 and over, there were 76.2 males.

The median income for a household in the town was $18,487, and the median income for a family was $20,625. Males had a median income of $22,083 versus $15,833 for females. The per capita income for the town was $8,881. About 35.6% of families and 40.1% of the population were below the poverty line, including 47.2% of those under age 18 and 37.7% of those age 65 or over.

In 2010, Melville had the 12th-lowest median household income of all places in the United States with a population over 1,000.

== Notable people ==
- Lottie Beebe, superintendent of public schools in St. Martin Parish
- Edward Honor Sr., retired lieutenant general of the U.S. Army
