= Roscoe Cartwright =

United States Army general

Roscoe Conklin Cartwright
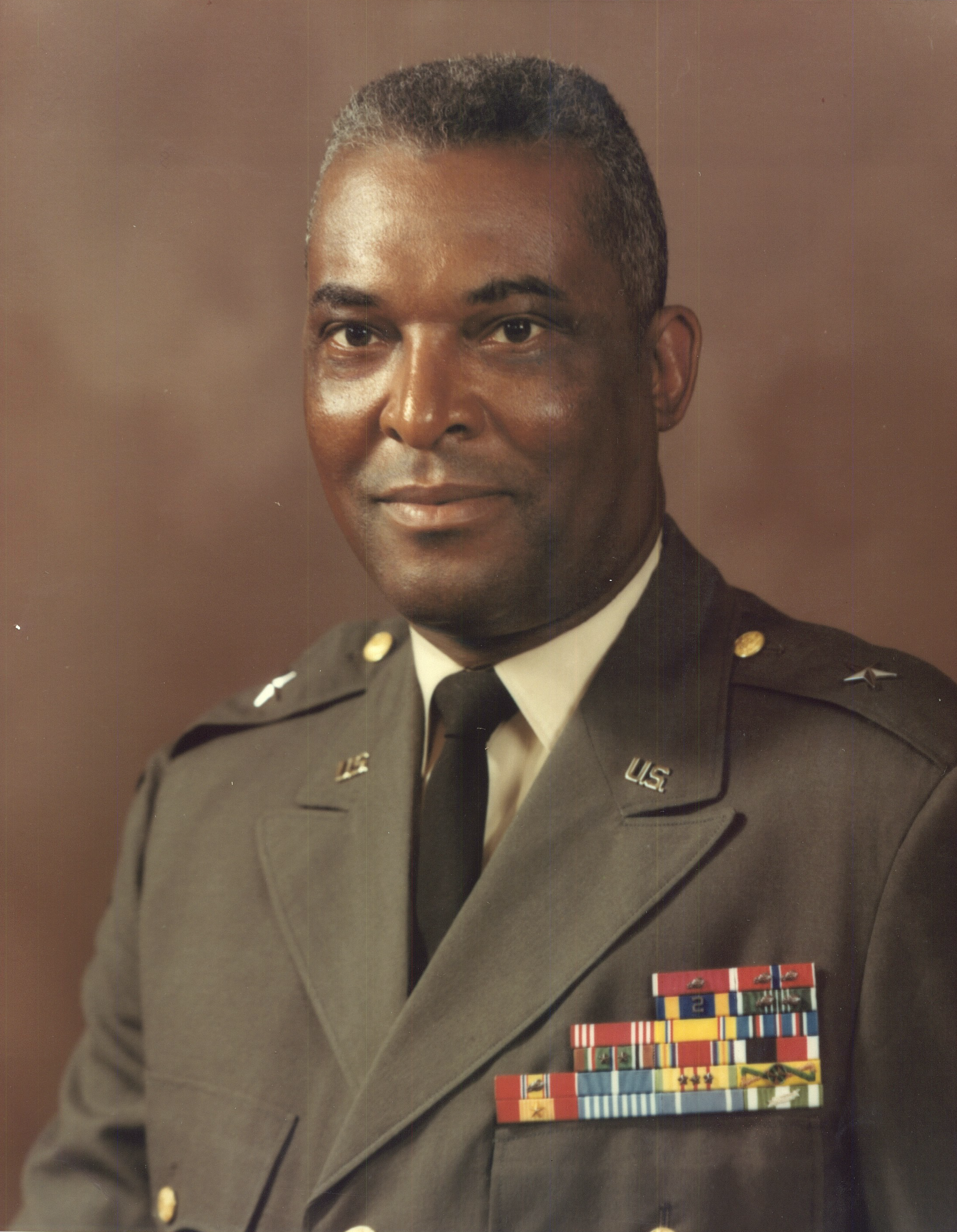
- Brigadier General Roscoe Cartwright
- Born: May 27, 1919; Kansas City, Kansas, U.S.
- Died: December 1, 1974 (aged 55)
- Burial place: Arlington National Cemetery
- Military career
- Allegiance: United States of America
- Branch: United States Army
- Service years: 1941–1974
- Rank: Brigadier General
- Nickname: "Rock"
- Commands: 108th Artillery Group
- Conflicts: World War II; Vietnam War
- Awards: Legion of Merit (2); Bronze Star (3); Meritorious Service Medal; Air Medal; Army Commendation Medal (3)

Roscoe Conklin "Rock" Cartwright (May 27, 1919 – December 1, 1974) was the United States' second-ever African American U.S. Army brigadier general, third-ever black American U.S. general officer, and the first black field artilleryman promoted to brigadier general.

== Early life, education and personal life ==
Cartwright was born in Kansas City, Kansas, on May 27, 1919. Raised in Tulsa, Oklahoma, Cartwright graduated from Booker T. Washington High School in 1936. He attended Kansas State Teachers College at Emporia, Kansas. Unable to afford his tuition at Kansas State, Cartwright ended his studies and worked at the University of Tulsa and the Bubble Up Bottling Company. In June 1960, Cartwright graduated from San Francisco State College with a BA Degree in Social Science. He also earned an MBA from the University of Missouri.

Cartwright was a 1974 initiate of Alpha Phi Alpha fraternity, a traditionally African-American college fraternity.

While temporarily stationed at Camp Robinson near Little Rock, Arkansas, Cartwright married Gloria Lacefied Cartwright, a native of Hope, Arkansas. They had four children, eight grandchildren and three great-grandchildren.

== Military career ==
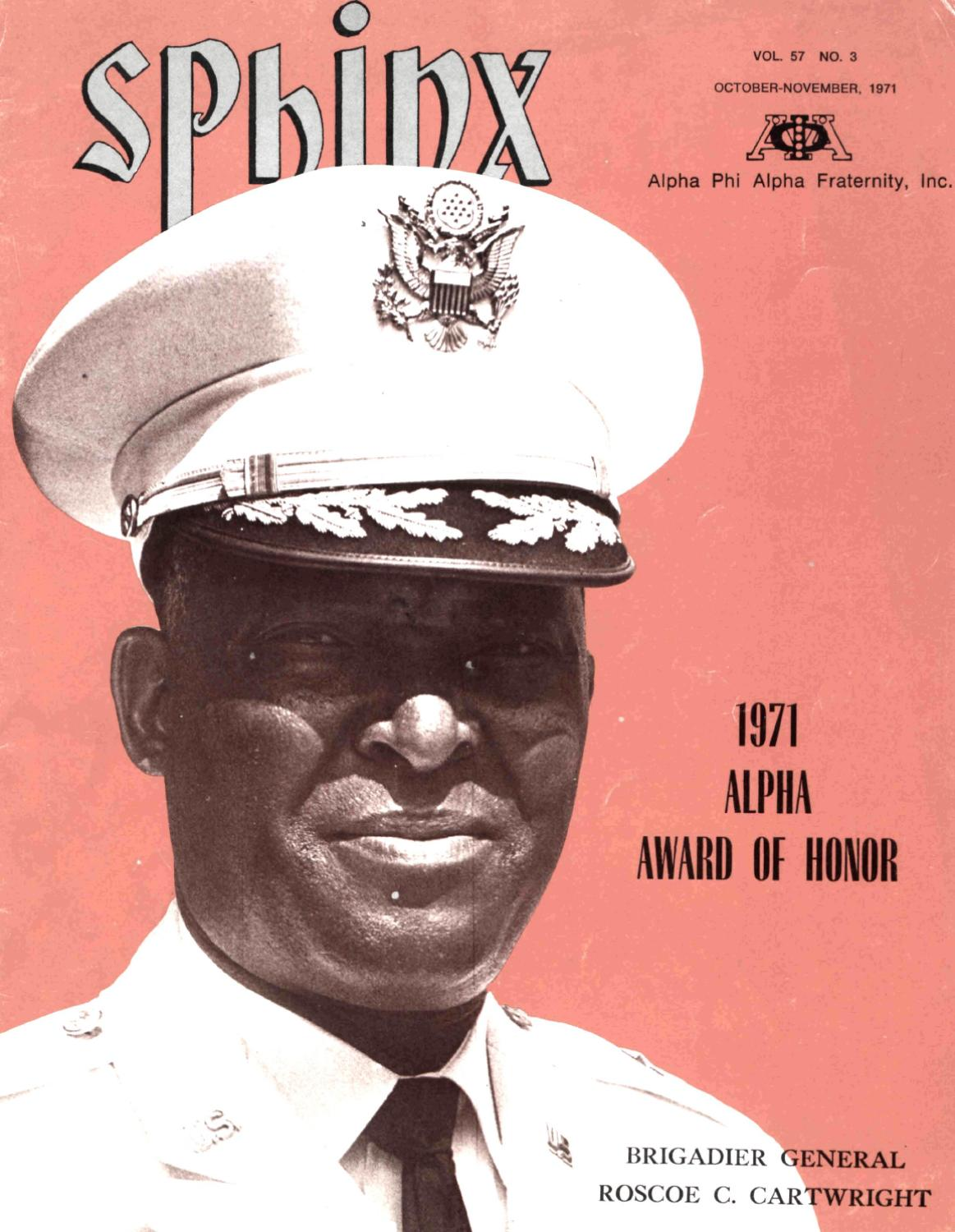
1971 Alpha Phi Alpha Award of Honor in Sphinx magazine

In 1941, the U.S. Army drafted Cartwright into the US Army as an enlisted man. The segregated US Army assigned him to the all-African American enlisted men 349th Field Artillery Regiment at Fort Sill, Oklahoma. The unit's officers were all white except the chaplain, an African American man.

In November 1942, Cartwright graduated from Officers Candidate School, receiving a commission as a Field Artillery Second Lieutenant in the 599th Field Artillery Battalion of the all-African American brigade of the 92nd Infantry Division, best known as the Buffalo Soldiers Serving primarily in Italy, Cartwright remained with the 599th throughout the remainder of World War II. After the war he was promoted to first lieutenant.

For three years, Cartwright taught Reserve Officer Training Corps (ROTC).

As a captain, Cartwright served in Japan and Korea. In 1954 he was transferred from a segregated unit into the "regular" integrated army as a major. He served in South Vietnam from 1969 until 1971, when he became the third African American after General Benjamin O. Davis Sr. and General Benjamin O. Davis Jr. to be promoted to brigadier general.

After working at the Pentagon, Cartwright retired from the military in 1974. He had served in the U.S. military for 33 years.

=== Medals and awards ===
- Two (2) Legion of Merit
- Three (3) Bronze Stars
- Meritorious Service Medal
- Three (3) Air Medal
- Three (3) Army Commendation Medal

== Death in TWA Flight 514 crash ==
On December 1, 1974, Cartwright and his wife Gloria were killed on TWA Flight 514 when the Boeing 727, flying in bad weather, crashed into the wooded slope of a 1,725 feet (526 m) mountain 25 nautical miles (46 km; 29 mi) northwest of Dulles International Airport. All 92 people aboard (85 passengers and 7 crew members) were killed. Cartwright's flight was the worst air disaster of 1974. Cartwright and Gloria were returning from visiting their daughter for Thanksgiving. Cartwright was 55 years old; Gloria was 49 years old.

Cartwright and his wife Gloria were buried at Arlington National Cemetery.

== Legacy ==
- In 1992, West Virginia State College posthumously inducted Cartwright into its ROTC Hall of Fame.
- With Colonel Robert B. Burke, Cartwright co-founded on October 9, 1974 The Rocks, Inc., the largest professional military officers organization with a majority African-American membership. The organization has been essential in the development of black military officers including member Colin Powell, as discussed in his autobiography.
- The Roscoe C. Cartwright Prince Hall Masonic Lodge #129 in Oxon Hill, Maryland is named for Cartwright.
