= DeLong pier =

Prefabricated self-elevating barge modules for lighter off-loading

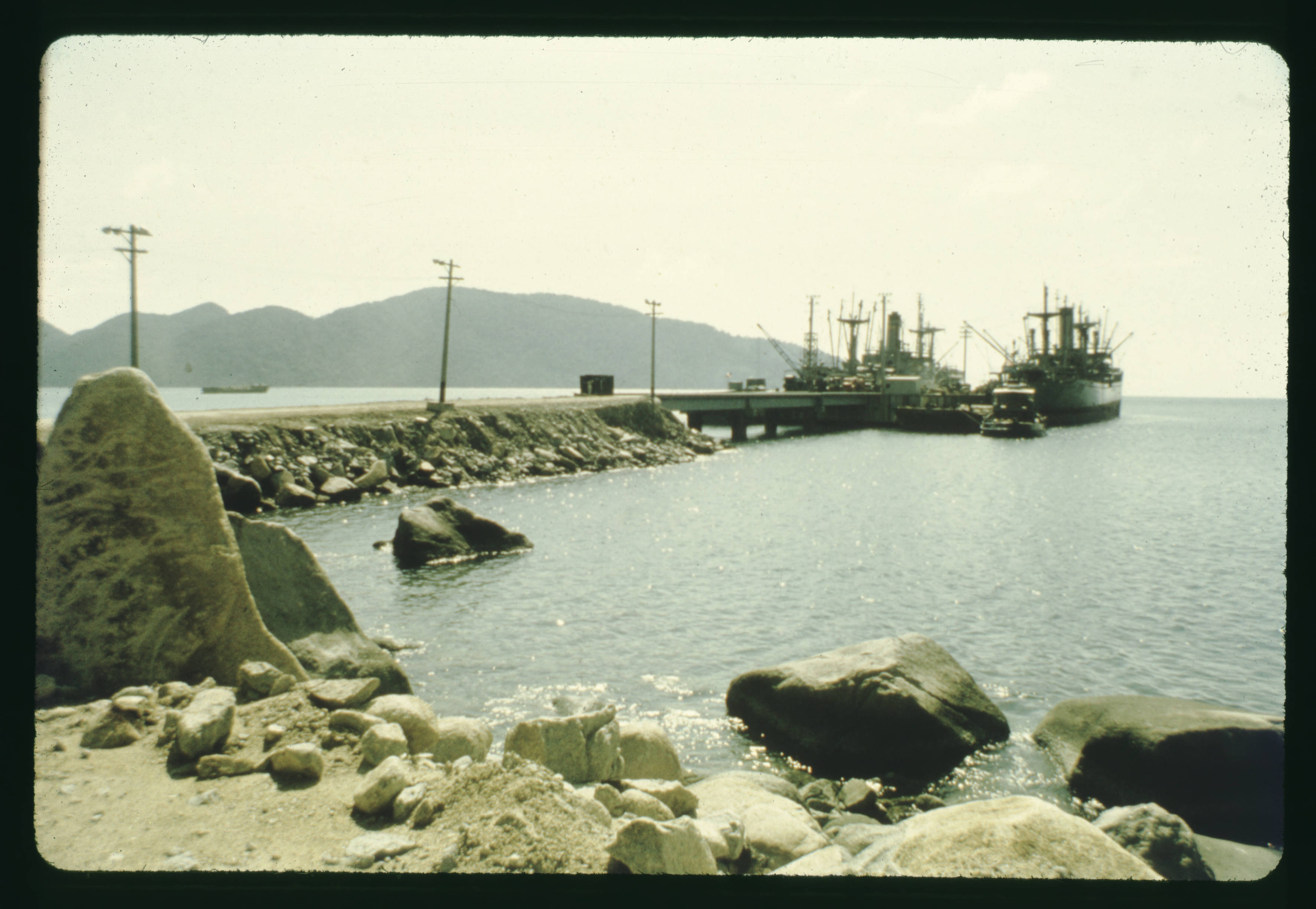
DeLong pier at Vũng Rô Bay, Vietnam, in 1968

A DeLong pier is a type of elonged ersatz pier constructed from prefabricated barge-like sections and simple caissons driven into a harbor's seafloor. First used during the Vietnam War at Cam Ranh Bay, the DeLong pier was originally designed shortly after the Second World War by the DeLong Corporation, and a prototype was constructed not long after in Charleston, South Carolina for use by the Transportation Corps in 1952. This prototype would, in late 1965, be the first of four DeLong piers installed in the bay by the 497th Port Engineer Company.

To install the pier, component barges carrying tubular caissons and jacks are towed along with a crane-bearing barge directly from the manufacturing or storage site to the target location. The barges are then placed in position near shore, where the crane-bearing barge then unloads the caissons and threads them through the wells of the component barges. The crane then operates a pile driver on each caisson to drive it into the seafloor. After this, the specially designed pneumatic jacks are lowered over the caissons, secured to the decks of the component barges, and begin to lift the barges above the water to create a pier of any desired height. After fenders are installed and construction equipment removed, the whole process was said to take between two and four weeks, depending on purpose, with a team of twelve workers.
