= Lottie Beebe =

American politician and educational administrator

Lottie Polozola Beebe

Member of the Louisiana Board of Elementary and Secondary Education for District 3
- In office January 2012 – October 2015
- Preceded by: Glenny Lee Castagnos Buquet
- Succeeded by: Sandy Holloway

Personal details
- Born: October 1953 (age 73) Melville; St. Landry Parish; Louisiana, USA
- Party: Democrat-turned-Republican
- Spouse(s): (1) Missing (2) Joseph Richard "Rick" Pearson, Sr.
- Children: Jeremy R. Beebe Tony James Beebe; Stepchildren: Joseph Richard "Joey" Pearson, Jr. Eric Blair Pearson Carrie A. Pearson
- Parent(s): Domminic and Betty Dukes Polozola
- Education: Melville High School Louisiana State University University of Louisiana at Lafayette Southeastern Louisiana University
- Occupation: School superintendent of St. Martin Parish

Lottie Polozola Beebe, sometimes known as Lottie Beebe-Pearson (born October 1953), is the former superintendent of public schools in St. Martin Parish, Louisiana. In September 2018, the St. Martin Parish School Board declined to renew Beebe's contract as superintendent, but she showed up for work the next day on the advice of her lawyer, L. Lane Roy of Lafayette. Beebe claims the school board action is "illegal" and "political" in nature.

Beebe is a Republican former member of the Louisiana Board of Elementary and Secondary Education for District 3 in South Louisiana. She had been an intraparty critic of former Governor Bobby Jindal particularly in regard to educational policies. District 3 includes all or portions of these parishes: Ascension, Assumption, Iberia, Iberville, Jefferson, Lafourche, Plaquemines, Pointe Coupee, St. Bernard, St. John the Baptist, and St. Landry, St. Martin, St. Mary, Terrebonne, and Vermilion.

== Background ==
A native of Melville in St. Landry Parish, Beebe was a daughter of the late Dominic Polotzola and the former Betty Dukes, later Betty Wyble (1935-2010). Lottie Polotzola apparently dropped the "t" from her maiden name. She graduated in 1971 from Melville High School. Known still as Lottie Beebe, from her first husband, she resides in Breaux Bridge with her second husband. She originally was a teacher in St. Landry Parish. For eight years, Beebe was an elected Democrat on the St. Landry Parish School Board in the District 5 position. While on that board, Beebe taught in St. Martin Parish, where she was, a principal for two years and the parish human resources officer.

In 2013, she was promoted to superintendent of St. Martin Parish while remaining in her second year on the BESE board; the St. Martin position pays $121,000 annually. Beebe obtained her master's degree from Louisiana State University. She received her doctoral degree in educational leadership from the University of Louisiana at Lafayette and the Southeastern Louisiana University Consortium.

Beebe is married to Joseph Richard "Rick" Pearson, Sr. (born February 1952), formerly of Lamar in Johnson County in northwestern Arkansas, who ran unsuccessfully in 2010 for the District 6 seat on the St. Martin Parish School Board. He was defeated by a fellow Republican, Robert E. Hollier. Together the Pearsons have five children.

== BESE board ==
Beebe won her seat from District 3 in the nonpartisan blanket primary held on October 22, 2011, when she unseated the Democrat Glenny Lee Castagnos Buquet (born 1926) of Houma in Terrebonne Parish, 68,079 votes (55.8 percent) to 53,986 (44.2 percent).

Buquet, who had been endorsed by Republican Governor Bobby Jindal despite their partisan difference, had announced her support for John C. White as the Louisiana state superintendent of education. Beebe opposed White's nomination. Upon her defeat, Buquet urged Beebe to back Jindal's reform agenda, particularly attempts to increase literacy and to enhance teacher evaluations of instruction.

Days after joining the BESE board, Beebe in January 2012 cast the only dissenting vote to Governor Jindal's nomination of White, calling for a wider search in choosing a new superintendent. On April 10, 2012, Beebe criticized Governor Jindal for the speed at which he passed his educational reform package, stating she believed he had pushed it through without proper dissent so that he could attend the 2012 Republican National Convention in Tampa, Florida, as a "shining star" of his party.

Through her tenure, Beebe remained an outspoken dissenter on the BESE board. She has criticized White for hiring "inexperienced out-of-staters" in the state department of education and has accused other BESE members of being "rubber stamps" for the Jindal-White educational agenda. She has also opposed the Common Core curriculum. Beebe's critics have accused her of relying on teacher unions for her comments, which she denies.

Beebe was unseated in the primary election held on October 24, 2015, by another Republican, Sandy Holloway, an educator from Thibodaux in Lafourche Parish, 46,605 (38.6 percent) to 74,078 (61.4 percent). Beebe's frequent ally, Democrat Carolyn Hill, was also unseated in her reelection bid.

Preceded by Glenny Lee Castagnos Buquet	Member of the Louisiana Board of Elementary and Secondary Education; 2012–2016	Succeeded by Sandy Holloway
