= Vũng Rô Bay =

Bay in Vietnam

Coordinates: 12°52′N 109°26′E

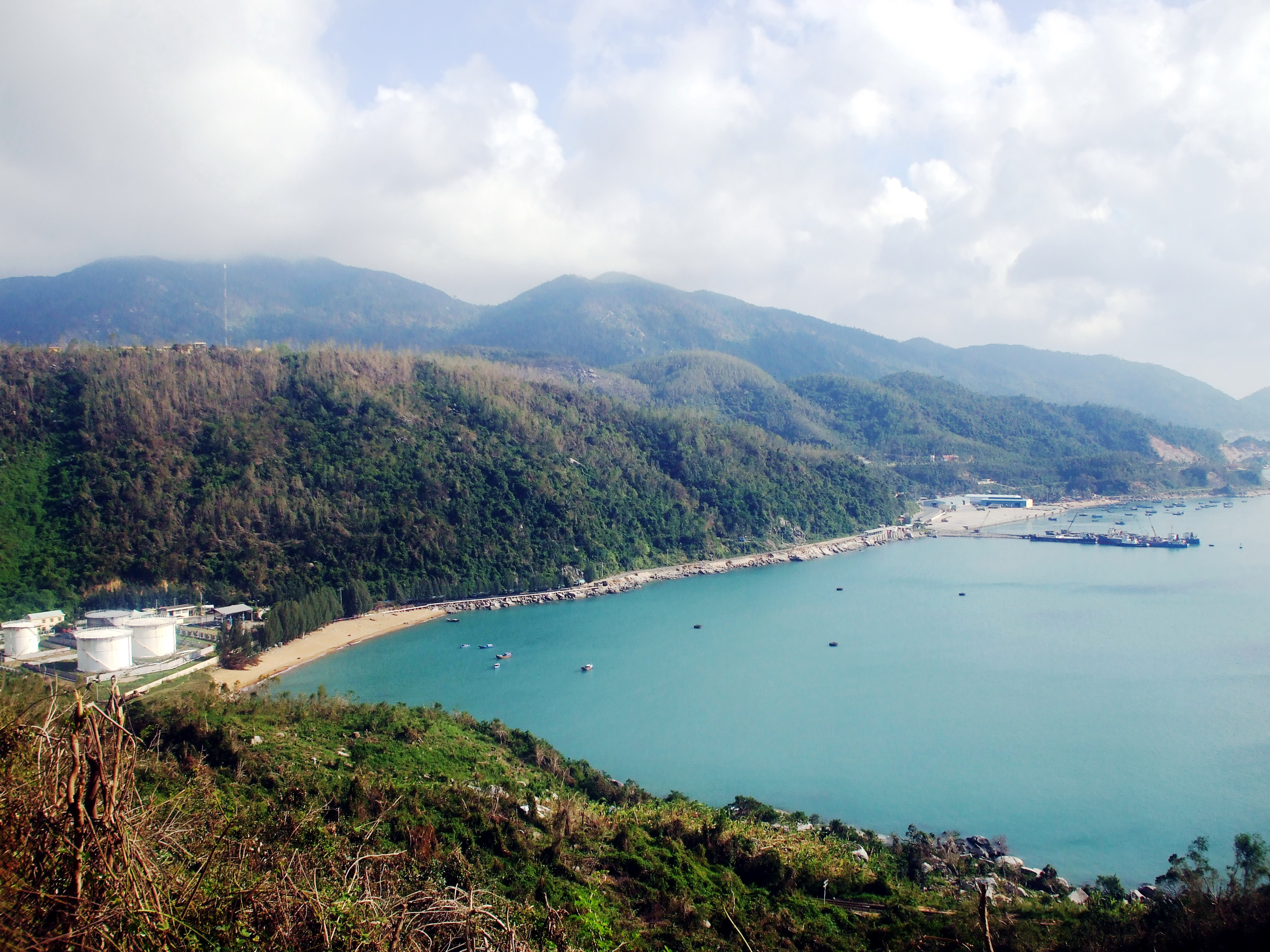
Vịnh Vũng Rô

Vũng Rô Bay (Vietnamese: Vịnh Vũng Rô) is a small bay in Đắk Lắk province, Vietnam. Vũng Rô is located in the commune (xã) of Hòa Xuân Nam, Phú Yên Province, located at the edge of Cả Pass mountains. The bay is the natural border of provinces of Đắk Lắk and Khánh Hòa.

Vung Ro covers an area of 16.4 square kilometres (6.3 mi^{2}) and is surrounded by Đèo Cả, Đá Bia and Hòn Bà mountains from the north, the east and the west respectively. There are some fine sand seasides by the bay. The bay is home to coral reefs.

== Vietnam War ==
In February 1965 the bay was the site of the Vũng Rô Bay incident.

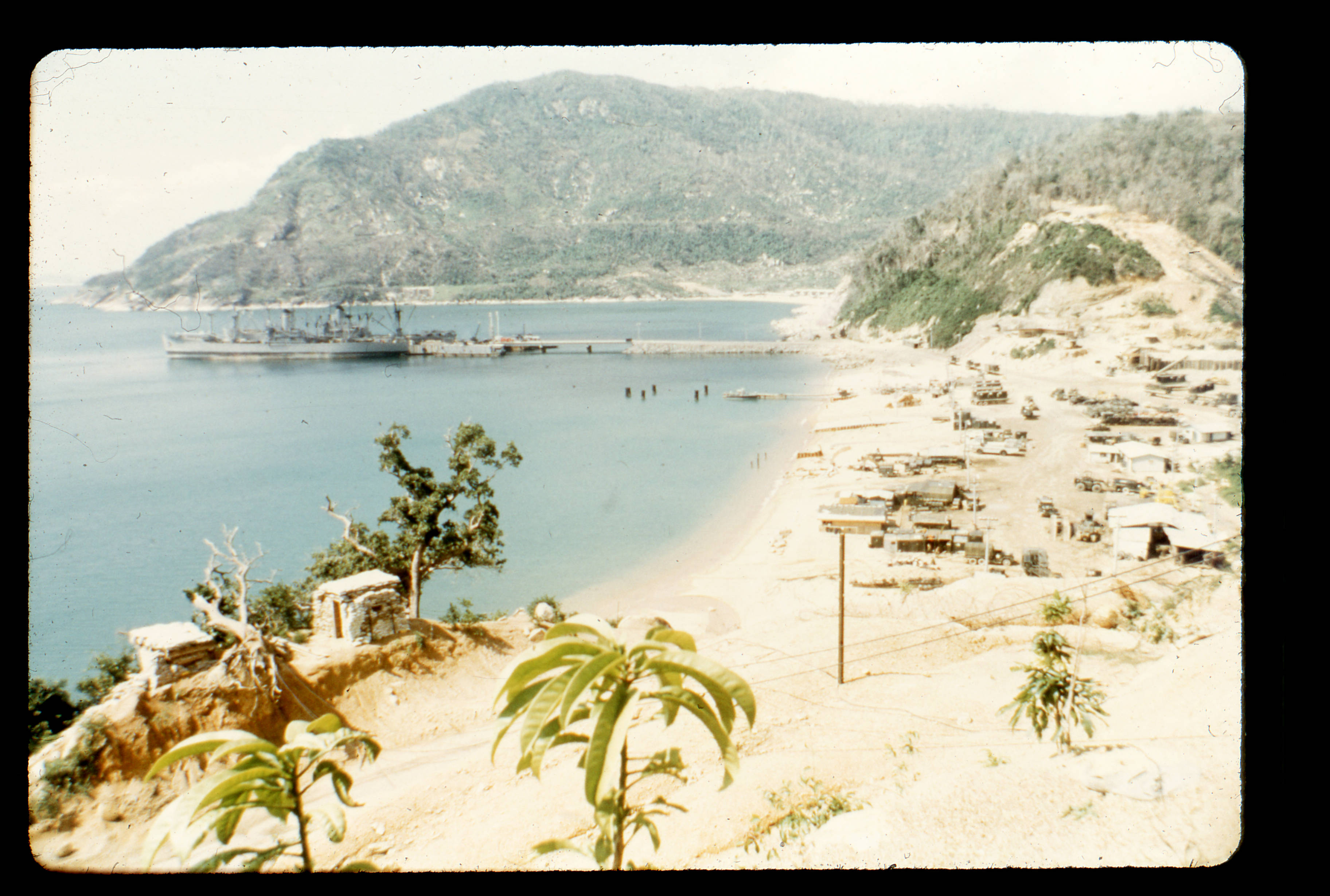
Port Lane, Vũng Rô Bay, 6 November 1968

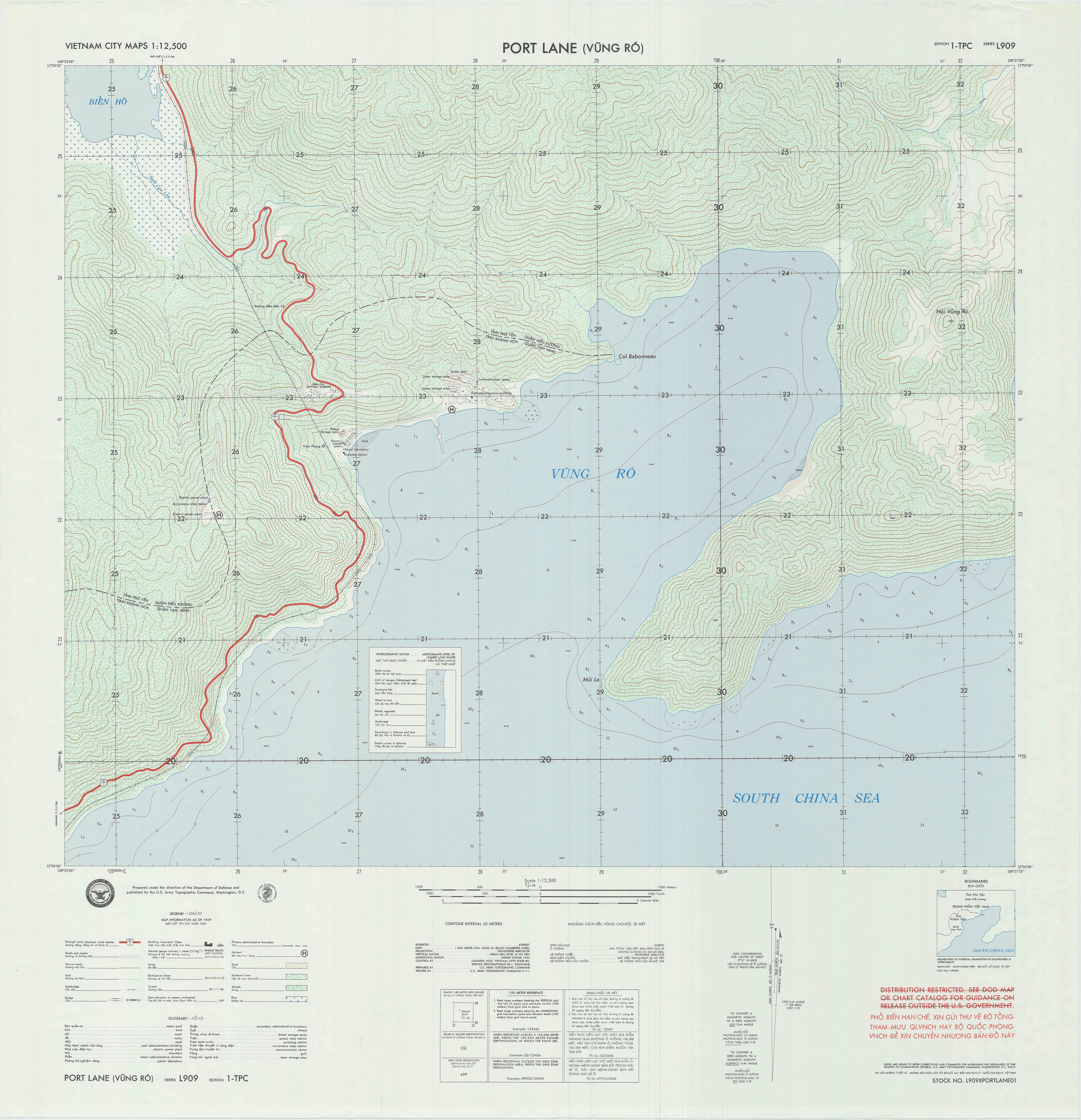
1969 map of Port Lane

In July 1966 the U.S. Army secured the area as part of Operation John Paul Jones and the 39th Engineer Battalion constructed a small port facility here to support U.S. Army operations in the area and relieve the logistical pressure on Tuy Hòa. The base was named Port Lane after LTC Ernest Lane who was killed in action on 18 May 1966.

The port facilities included two concrete Landing Ship, Tank (LST) ramps, a Navy cube causeway for barge off loading and a hardstand area, all of which were fully operational by 16 October 1966. The hardstand area was enlarged and the side of a hill was cleared in order to provide fill material for a causeway. Two DeLong pier units were placed at the end of this causeway by late December 1966.
