= Morganza Spillway =

Flood-control structure in Louisiana, U.S.

Coordinates: 30.7766°N 91.6199°W

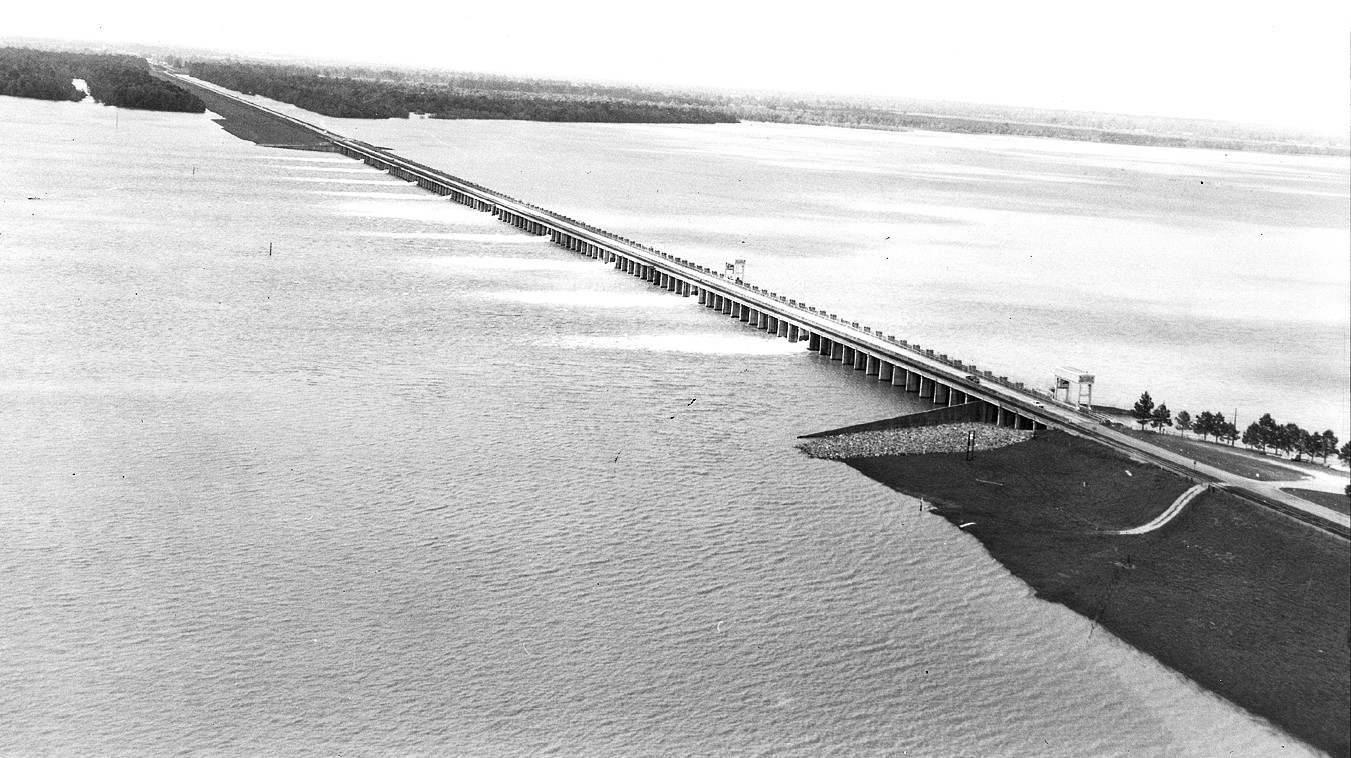
The Morganza Spillway, between the Mississippi River and the Atchafalaya Basin, shown while open in 1973. Water flows from the Mississippi (upper right) into the Morganza Floodway (lower left).

The Morganza Spillway or Morganza Control Structure is a flood-control structure in the U.S. state of Louisiana. It is located along the western bank of the Lower Mississippi River at river mile 280, near Morganza in Pointe Coupee Parish. The spillway stands between the Mississippi and the Morganza Floodway, which leads to the Atchafalaya Basin and the Atchafalaya River in south-central Louisiana. Its purpose is to divert water from the Mississippi River during major flood events by flooding the Atchafalaya Basin, including the Atchafalaya River and the Atchafalaya Swamp. The spillway and adjacent levees also help prevent the Mississippi from changing its present course through the major port cities of Baton Rouge and New Orleans to a new course down the Atchafalaya River to the Gulf of Mexico. The Morganza Spillway, operated by the U.S. Army Corps of Engineers, was opened during the 1973 and 2011 Mississippi River floods.

== History ==
The Great Mississippi Flood of 1927 was the most destructive river flood in the history of the United States. This was in large part due to the Mississippi River swelling to 80 miles (130 km) wide in spots. To prevent a repeat of the Great Flood of 1927, and to have better control over river flooding in general, Congress passed the Flood Control Act of 1928. This authorized the United States Army Corps of Engineers to build the Bonnet Carre Spillway, (Note: Located 33 miles (53 km) above New Orleans and completed in 1931.) the Birds Point floodway in Missouri, and the Morganza Floodway as part of the 1928 Mississippi River and Tributaries Project.

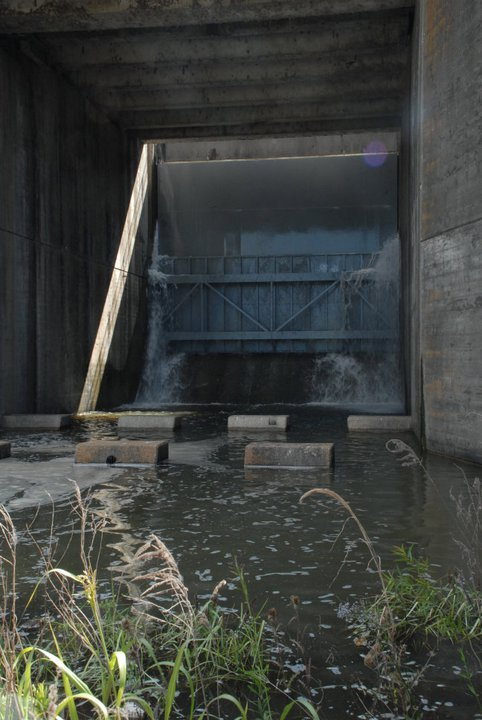
One of the 125 gates on the tail bay side of the Morganza Floodway.

Construction of the levees that make up part of the Morganza Spillway began in the late 1930s. The Morganza Control Structure portion of the project was completed in 1954. It subsequently became incorporated into the Mississippi River Commission's 1956 project design flood, which added the Old River Control Structure (ORCS) in 1963 to the protections used to prevent Mississippi River flood. The Flood Control Act of 1965 provided further regulation over the Morganza Spillway's role in Mississippi River flood prevention. A concrete pit called a stilling basin was added at the Morganza Spillway in 1977 "to provide erosion protection after the velocity of water pouring through the open bays during a 1973 flood caused severe scouring of the land behind the bays."

== Design and construction ==
The Morganza Spillway, a 4,159-foot (1,268 m) controlled spillway using a set of flood gates to control the volume of water entering the Morganza Floodway from the Mississippi River, consists of a concrete weir, two sluice gates, seventeen scour indicators, and 125 gated openings which can allow up to 600,000 cubic feet per second (17,000 cubic metres per second) of water to be diverted from the Mississippi River into the Atchafalaya Basin during major floods. The project was completed in 1954.

A highway (Louisiana Route 1) and the Kansas City Southern Railway cross the structure.

The Corps of Engineers maintains the structures and, in times of flood, monitors their piers for scouring and stability. The Corps of Engineers has two 25-ton cranes used to lift and lower the flood gates. The cranes roll on special tracks next to the roadway, enabling the operators to open or shut any spillway gate or perform maintenance while the roadway is in use.

== Operation during floods ==
The land on both sides of the Morganza Control Structure is above normal river water levels, and usually dry. In order for water to reach the spillway, the Mississippi must first rise well above its flood stage, overtopping its banks. The Corps of Engineers considers opening the Morganza Spillway when the flow of the Mississippi at Red River Landing, Louisiana, is greater than 1,500,000 cu ft/s (42,000 m^{3}/s) and rising.

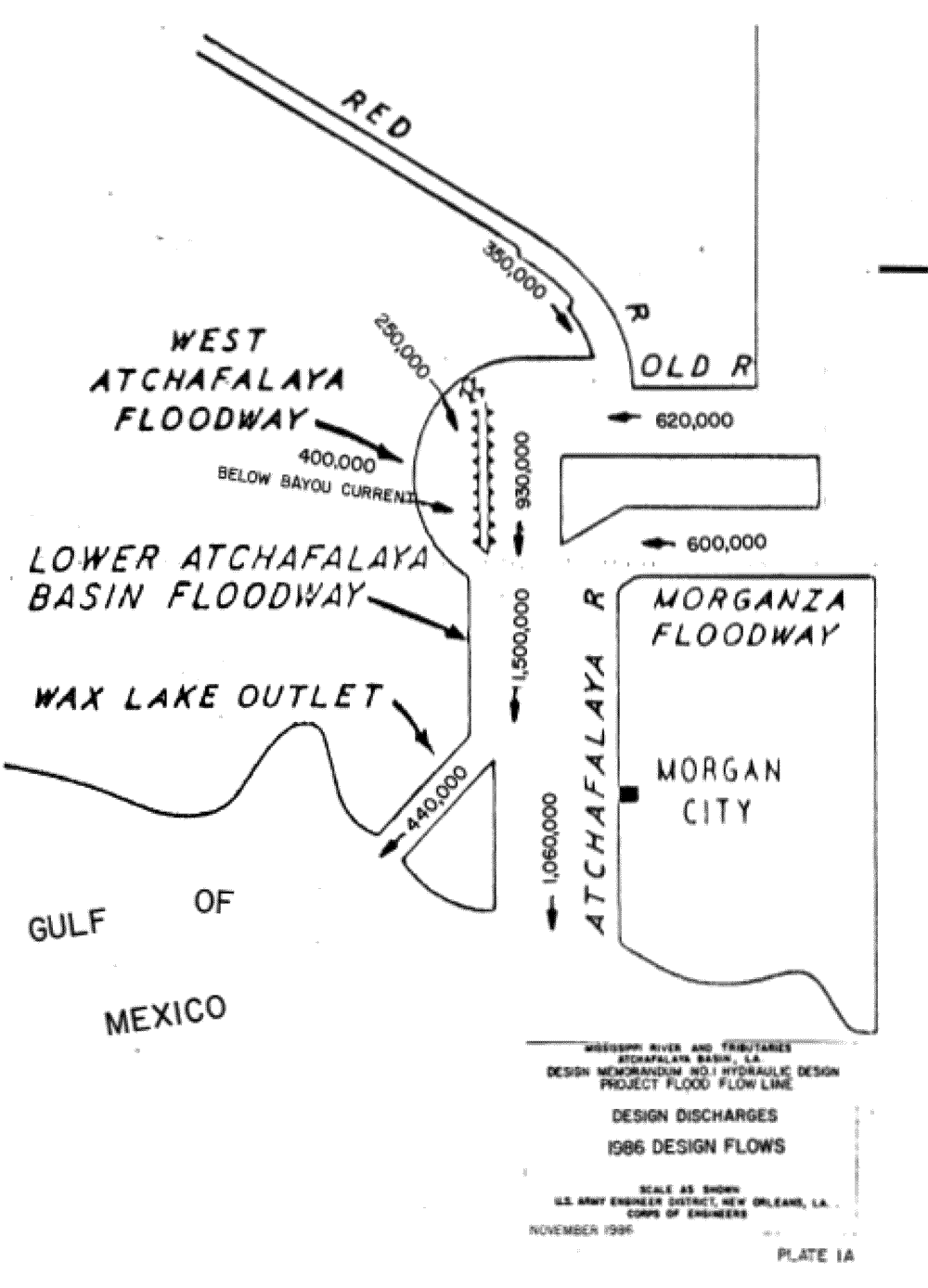
A diagram that depicts river flow through the Morganza Spillway to the Red and Atchafalaya Rivers associated with a project design flood, which is the hypothetical "maximum probable" flood of the Mississippi River, as estimated by the Corps of Engineers. The water channel flow rates are listed in cubic feet per second.

Water from the Mississippi is normally diverted into the Atchafalaya Basin at only one place, the Old River Control Structure (ORCS), in use since 1963, where floodgates are routinely used to redirect the Mississippi's flow into the Atchafalaya River such that the volume of the two rivers is split 70%/30%, respectively, as measured at the latitude of Red River Landing. During the 1973 Mississippi flood, the ORCS was being damaged due to high flow rates, leading to the opening of the Morganza Spillway to help relieve this pressure. Subsequently, the nearby Old River Control Auxiliary Structure (ORCAS) was constructed, adding additional floodgates for use during major floods.

The Morganza Spillway, about 30 miles (48 km) downriver from ORCS and ORCAS, is designed for emergency use to divert additional water from the Mississippi River into the Morganza floodway, which merges downstream with the Atchafalaya floodway before entering the Gulf. Diversion of water from the Mississippi's main channel has the effect of lowering water level in the Mississippi downstream of the spillway, helping to relieve stress on levees and other flood control structures both upstream and down. Besides controlling flooding in a given event, the system is also designed to prevent the Mississippi River from permanently altering course down the Atchafalaya River, bypassing Baton Rouge and New Orleans.

Water that passes the Morganza Spillway first enters the Morganza Floodway, which extends from the spillway at the Mississippi River south to the East Atchafalaya River levee. The floodway, 20 miles (32 km) long and 5 miles (8.0 km) wide, includes a stilling basin, an approach channel, an outlet channel, and two guide levees. From there, diverted water enters the Atchafalaya River Basin Floodway near Krotz Springs, Louisiana, and continues to the Gulf of Mexico.

In an extreme flood event, a major release of water from the Morganza Spillway into the Morganza Floodway and Atchafalaya Basin inundates not only the floodways themselves (between their levees), but extensive additional areas of southern Louisiana throughout the Atchafalaya Basin. In such an event, the water level of the Mississippi, high enough to overtop the Spillway, would already be flooding some areas in the Basin downstream of the spillway, due to increased flow through the ORCS and the ORCAS, as well as possible overtopping of levees near the spillway. This flooding, plus any additional water from a Morganza Spillway release, together determine the total extent of flooding throughout the Atchafalaya Basin during a major Mississippi River flood.

At risk in the Atchafalaya Basin are Morgan City (population 13,500), various smaller populated places, many farms, thousands of oil and gas wells, and considerable swampland. Inhabitants know that the region is a natural floodplain, and the Corps of Engineers issues written notices annually to all interests reminding them of the possibility that it might open the spillway and flood the area. Any decision to open the spillway must be carefully planned to give ample warning and protect life and property. Part of that planning process includes the Corps' preparation of maps known as "inundation scenarios" so that interested parties can discuss how much water, if any, should be allowed through the spillway.

During both moderate and severe floods of the Mississippi, the Bonnet Carré Spillway can also be opened to help protect New Orleans, many parts of which are below sea level. The Bonnet Carré Spillway, built after the Great Mississippi Flood of 1927, is located well downstream of Morganza, where the Mississippi River approaches Lake Pontchartrain near New Orleans. The Corps uses Bonnet Carré to divert floodwaters into the lake in order to protect the levees near New Orleans.

Integrity of the Morganza Spillway, the Old River Control Structure, and nearby levees is essential to prevent the Mississippi from diverting its main channel into the Atchafalaya Basin.

== Flood events and the Morganza Spillway ==
Since its completion in 1954, the Morganza Spillway has been opened twice, in 1973 and 2011. The Morganza Spillway was also considered for opening during other major floods of the Lower Mississippi River.

=== First opening of gates (1973) ===
On April 17, 1973, in order to lower the water level of the Mississippi River and relieve pressure on the Old River Control Structure, the Corps of Engineers opened 42 of the 125 steel gates of the Morganza Spillway for the first time since its completion, allowing about half of its maximum designed flow rate to pass from the Mississippi into the Atchafalaya Basin. The spillway received minor scouring and slight damage to the stilling basin, and substantial flooding occurred in the Atchafalaya Basin. After the 1973 flood, the structure was restored to its original condition.

=== Gates left closed in floods of 1983, 1993, 1997, 2008, and 2016 ===
The issue of opening the gates to keep the Mississippi in its current place was next raised in May 1983. Although the gates were not opened, Louisiana Highway 1 running across the spillway was closed, and the Corps of Engineers built a 12-foot (3.7 m) ring dike and put a blanket of earth across a section of the spillway to contain water pouring underneath it.

During the Great Mississippi and Missouri Rivers Flood in 1993, officials decided to leave the gates of the Morganza Floodway closed.

In March 1997, the river water flow at Baton Rouge reached 10,600,000 US gal (1,420,000 cu ft) (40,000 m^{3}) per second. However, the flow rate never reached the threshold of 11,200,000 US gal (1,500,000 cu ft) (42,000 m^{3}) per second for opening Morganza, and residents of Sicily Island, Louisiana, became angry that the spillway was not opened to prevent flooding in their homes.

In March–April 2008, officials considered but declined to open the spillway gates. While the spillway gates remained closed then, flooding occurred in the Morganza forebay when the Mississippi River crested higher than the potato ridge levee at the forebay entrance. Local residents and National Guard troops attempted to add height to the permanent levee by building a supplemental sandbag levee on top of it. However, additional rainfall raised the flood crest higher than even the supplemental sandbags, sending floodwaters over these levees into 3,000 acres (1,200 ha) of cropland located within the floodway. In the spring of 2016, the Corps considered opening the spillway but the forecast was lowered for the crest of the Mississippi River at Red River Landing, so the gates were left closed.

=== Second opening of gates (2011) ===
Flooding Scenarios

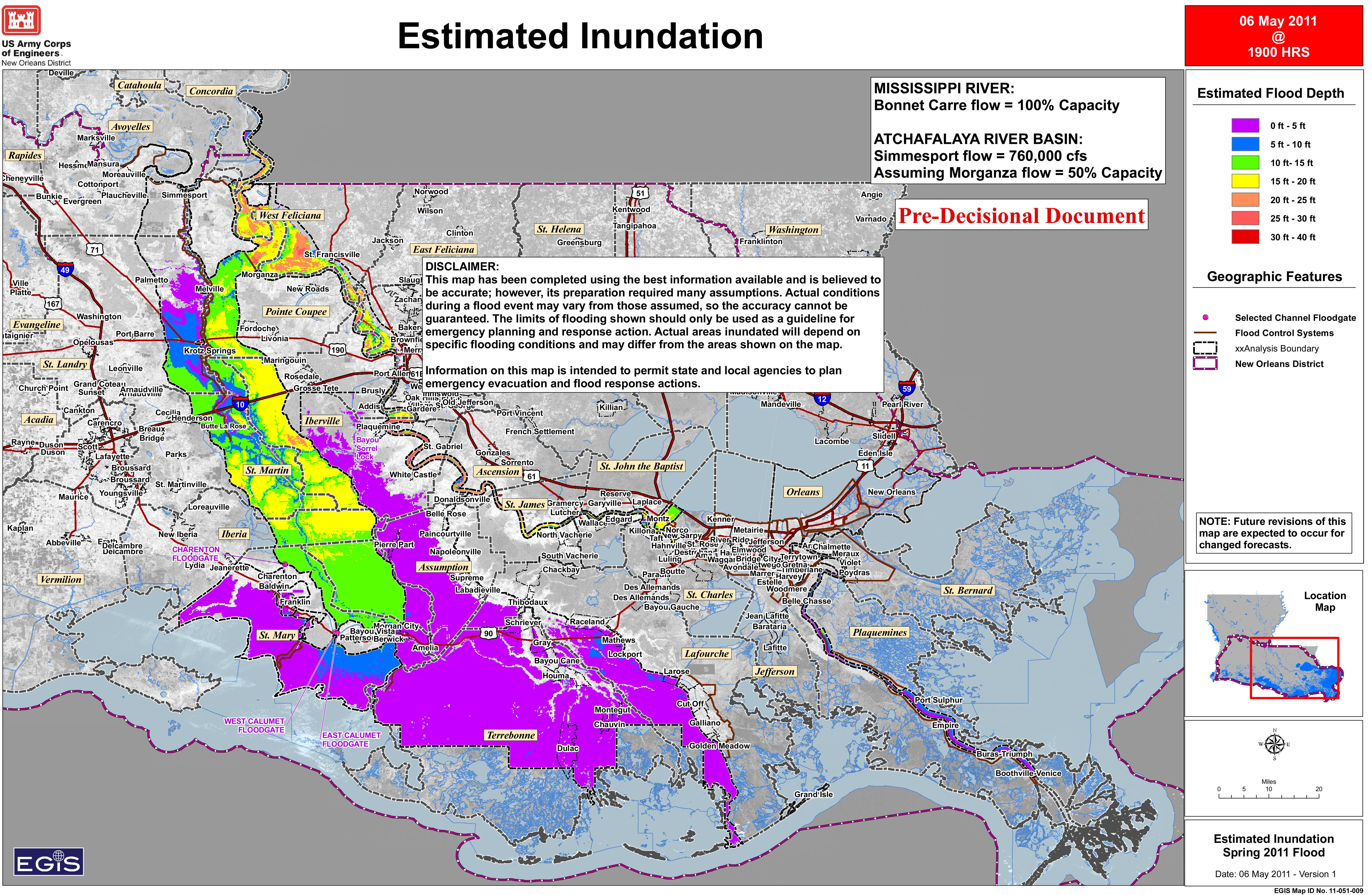
Anticipated inundation from Scenario 1

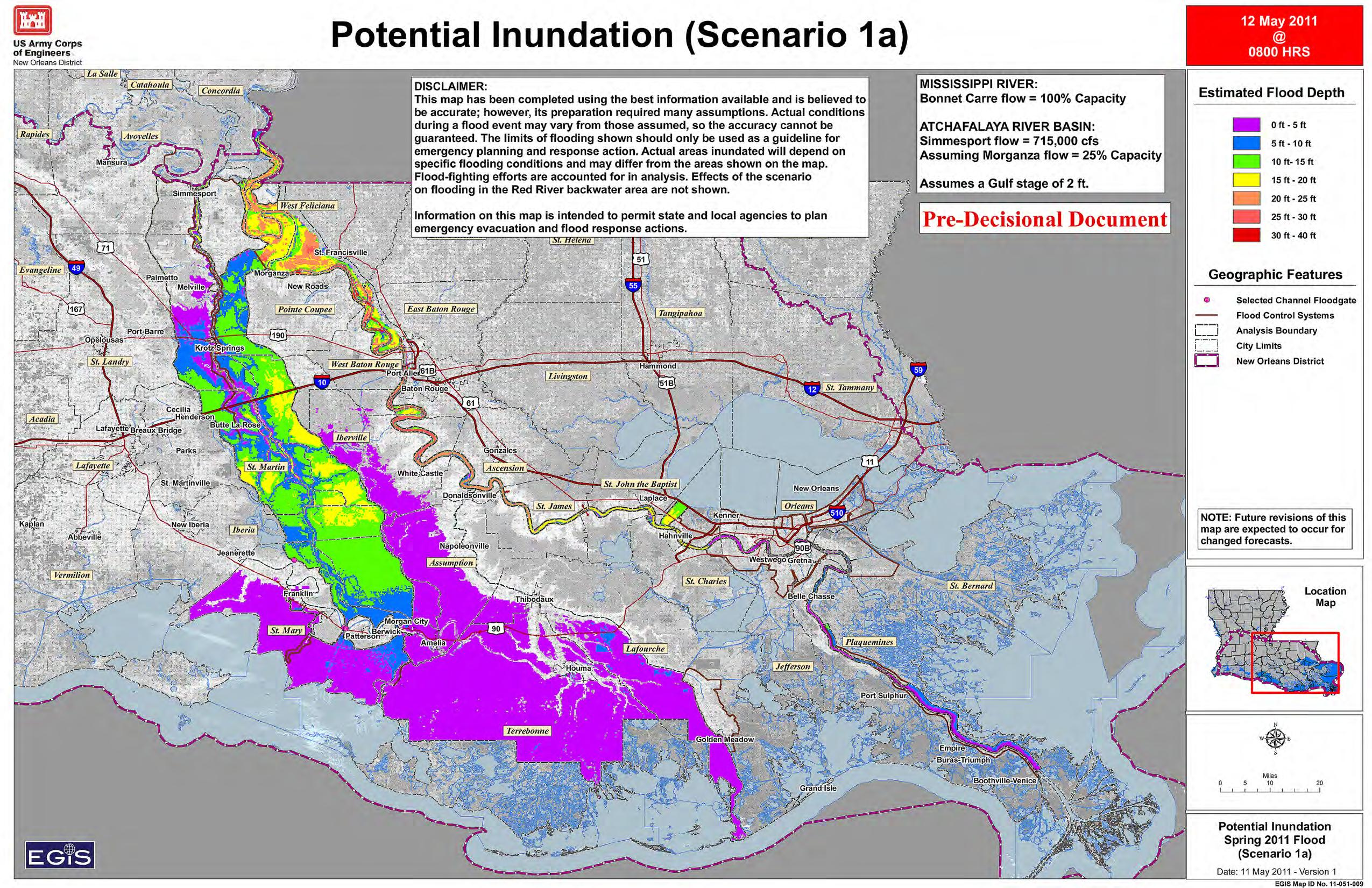
Anticipated inundation from Scenario 1a

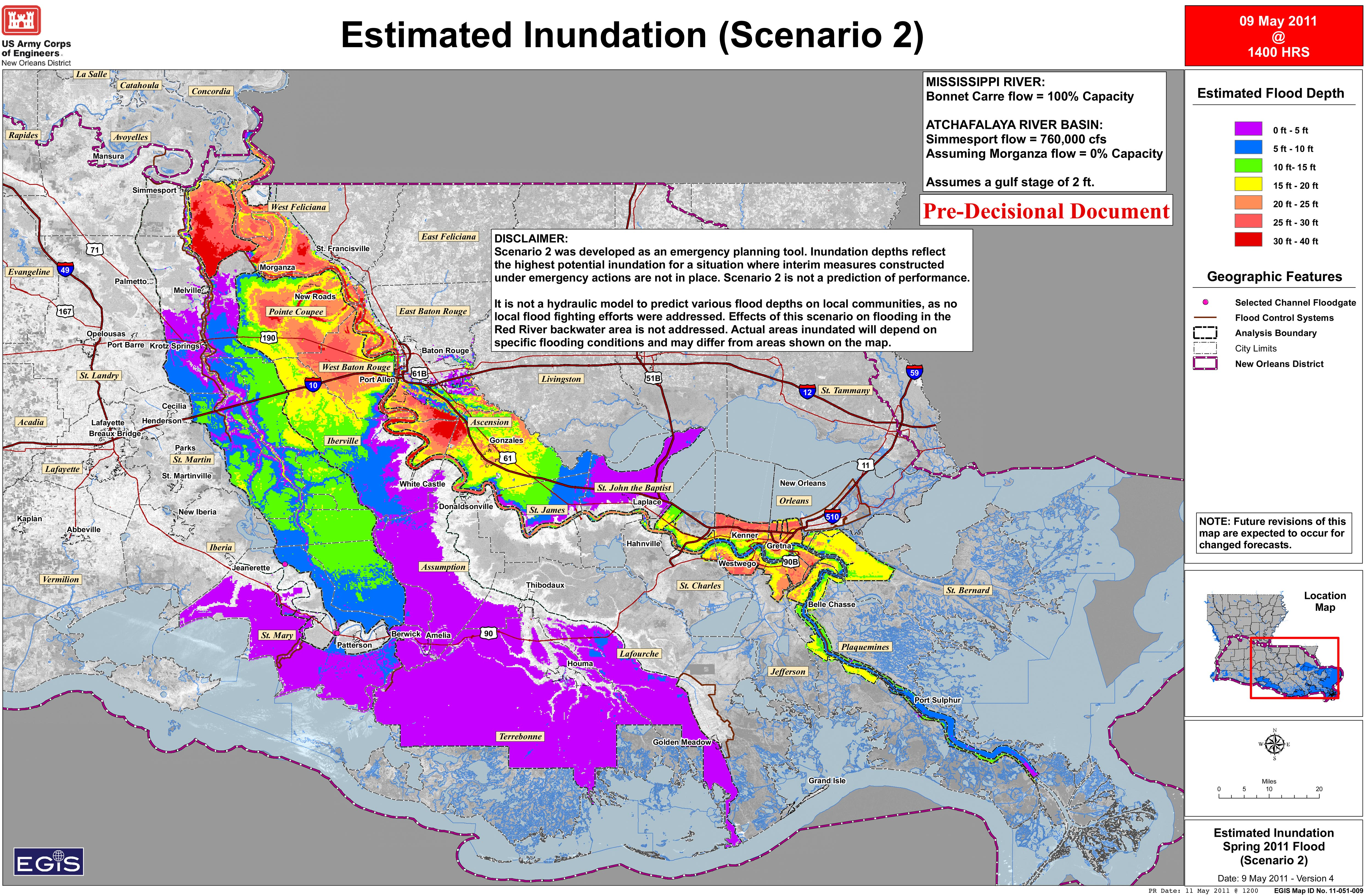
Anticipated inundation from Scenario 2

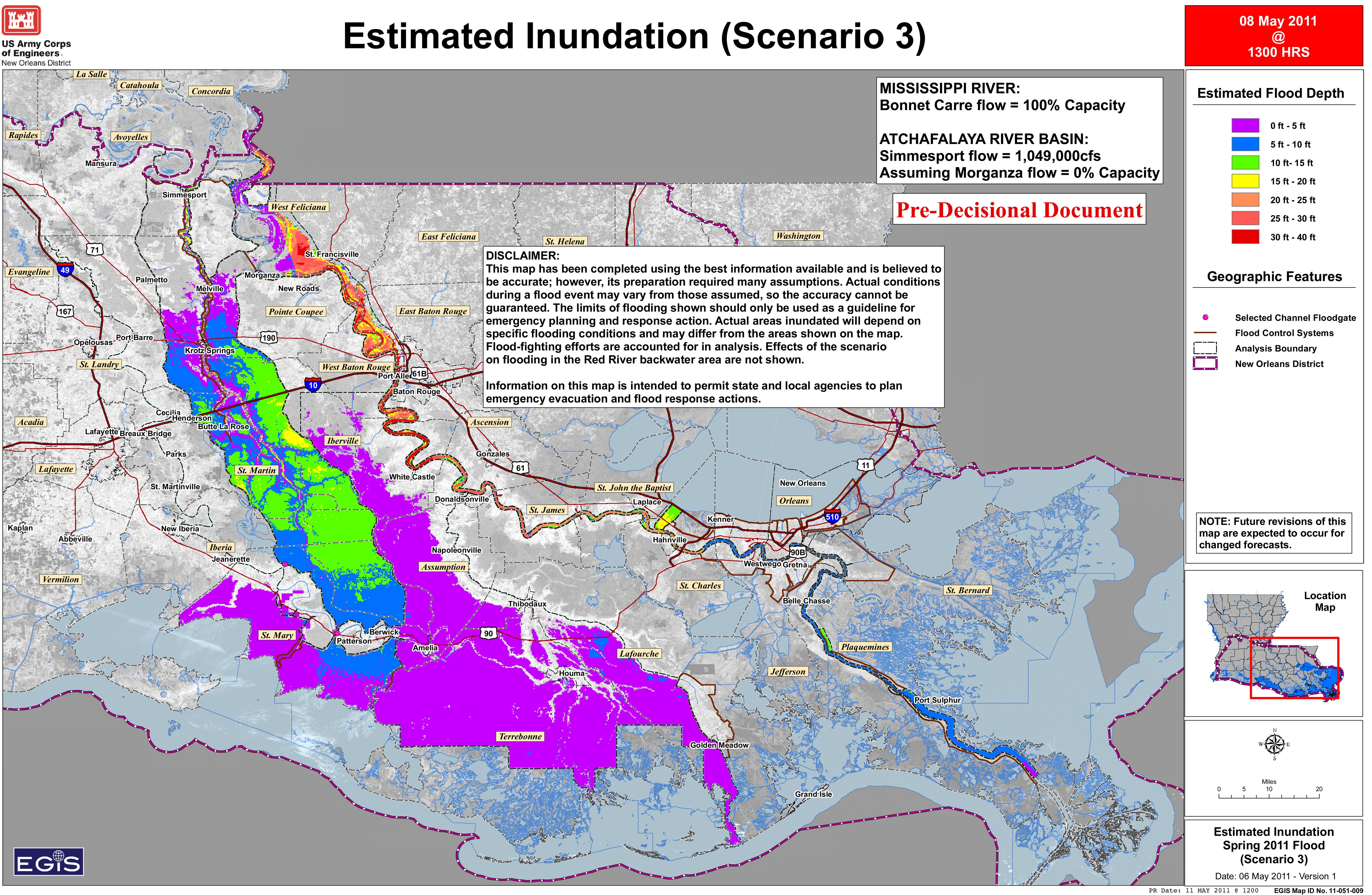
Anticipated inundation from Scenario 3

The 2011 Mississippi River floods began to become serious in April. In response, the Corps first analyzed the flooding, and then opened the spillway in a controlled manner. The Corps studied four flooding scenarios, all of which assumed the Bonnet Carré Spillway would be concurrently operating at full capacity (100%).

- Scenario 1: Open the Morganza Spillway to half (50%) of its maximum capacity, which would divert 300,000 cubic feet per second (8,500 m^{3}/s) of water.
- Scenario 1a: Open the Morganza Spillway to one-quarter (25%) of its maximum capacity, which would divert 150,000 cubic feet per second (4,200 m^{3}/s) of water.
- Scenario 2: Do not open the Morganza Spillway, and keep the Old River Control Structure (ORCS) at its routine operating level of only 30% of the Mississippi's flow; no additional water would be diverted
- Scenario 3: Do not open the Morganza Spillway, and open the ORCS somewhat more, which would divert an extra 150,000 cubic feet per second (4,200 m^{3}/s) of water.

Following this analysis, which showed that extensive flooding was expected in the Atchafalaya Basin regardless of the choice made regarding the Morganza Spillway, the Corps decided to start the 2011 diversion by opening the spillway a bit less than described in scenario 1a (21%, not 25%)

The Governor of Louisiana, Bobby Jindal, had meanwhile sent a letter on May 4, 2011, to Robert Gates, the United States Secretary of Defense, requesting that the National Guard be deployed under Title 32 of the United States Code status to respond to record water levels in Louisiana, where there was "a significant probability that the U.S. Army Corps of Engineers [would] open the Morganza Spillway for the first time since 1973."

The second opening of the Morganza Spillway began with the lifting of a single floodgate on May 14, 2011. Diversion of 125,000 cubic feet per second (3,500 m^{3}/s) of water from the Mississippi River to the Atchafalaya Basin was planned during this event, with the structure operating at about 21% of its capacity. This diversion was deemed necessary to protect levees and prevent major flooding in Baton Rouge and New Orleans, with the tradeoff of creating possibly severe flooding in the Atchafalaya Basin.

By May 18, 2011, a total of 17 gates (the largest number for the 2011 event) had been opened by the Corps of Engineers. The Corps estimated the flow rate at 114,000 cu ft/s (3,200 m^{3}/s). However, on May 25, new estimates from the U.S. Geologic Survey (USGS) described a much higher rate of 172,000 cu ft/s (4,900 m^{3}/s), resulting in the closure of 3 bays by May 26, and additional closures by May 29, bringing the total to 11 bays with an estimated diversion rate of 120,000 cu ft/s (3,400 m^{3}/s). The Corps continued to evaluate the flow and close additional bays as appropriate. By June 6, the number of open gates had been reduced to seven, and by June 8, only two gates were still open. All bays were closed on July 7, 2011.

The Corps had estimated that it would take opening 31 of the Spillway's 125 bays to control the flow of the river through Baton Rouge in response to a forecast crest of 45 feet (14 m) anticipated on Tuesday, May 17, 2011, which must remain below 1,500,000 cu ft/s (42,000 m^{3}/s) of water per second through Baton Rouge to ensure the integrity of the levee system. Since Morganza never operated above 172,000 cu ft/s (4,900 m^{3}/s), the flooding in the Atchafalaya Basin was considerably lower than had been anticipated during the initial estimates of 300,000 cu ft/s (8,500 m^{3}/s). By May 29, the Corps had also opened 330 of the 350 bays of the Bonnet Carré Spillway located near New Orleans.

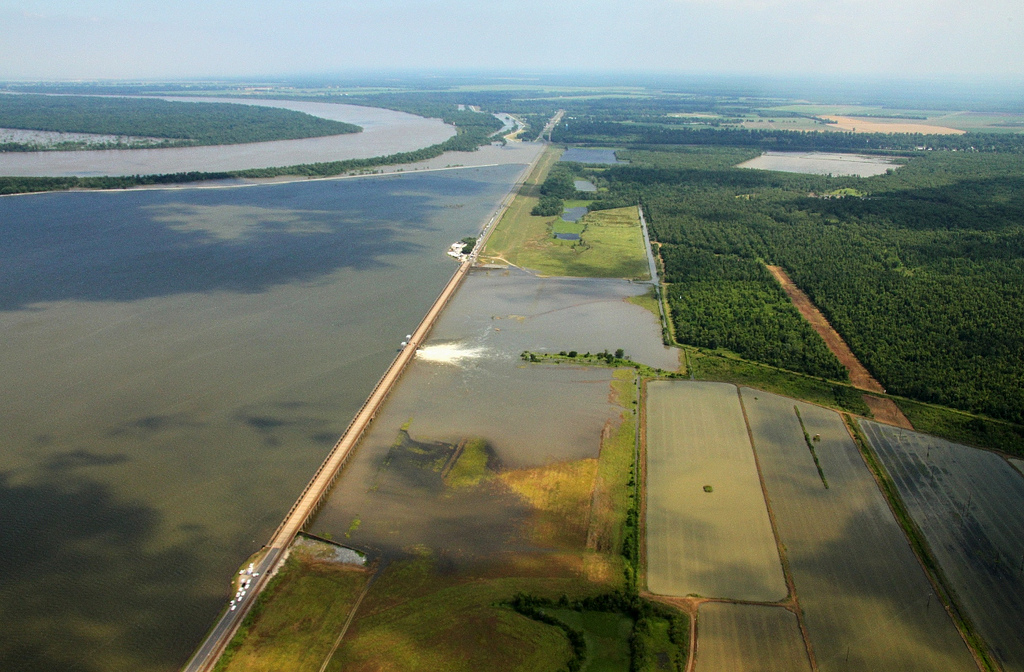
Aerial photograph of the first bay opening on the Morganza Floodway on 14 May 2011. The Mississippi River is in the upper left background, and the Atchafalaya Floodway to the right.

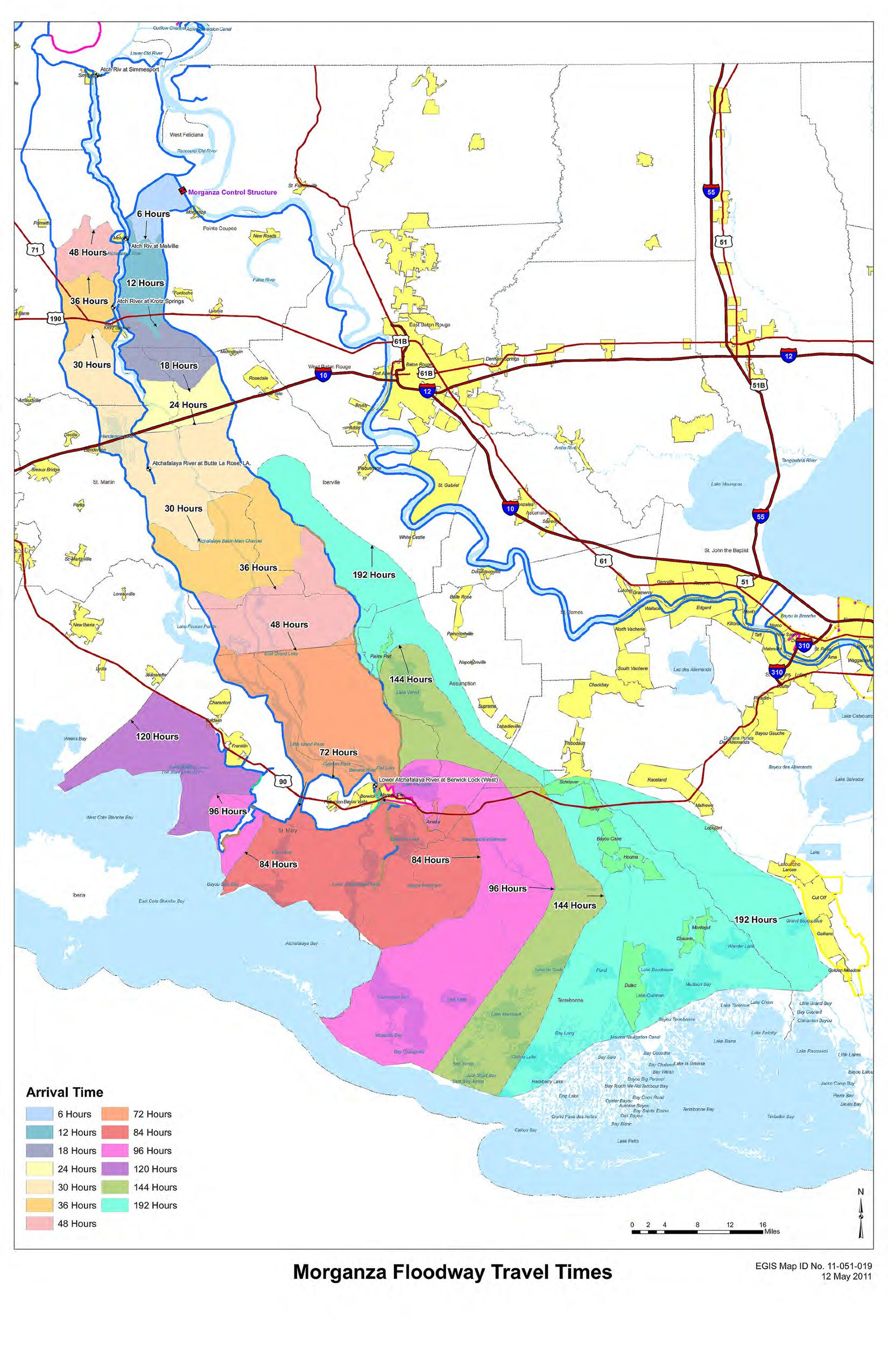
Water travel time down the Morganza Floodway after the May 14, 2011 opening.

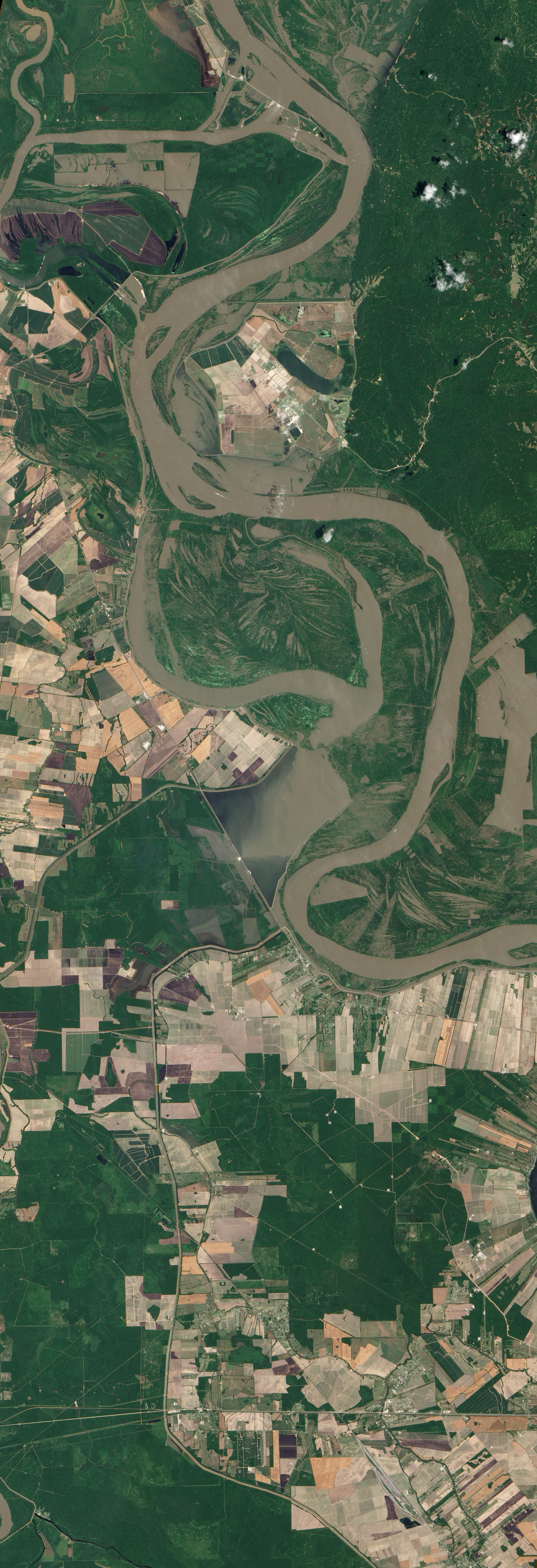
Natural-colour satellite image of the Floodway on May 15, 2011.

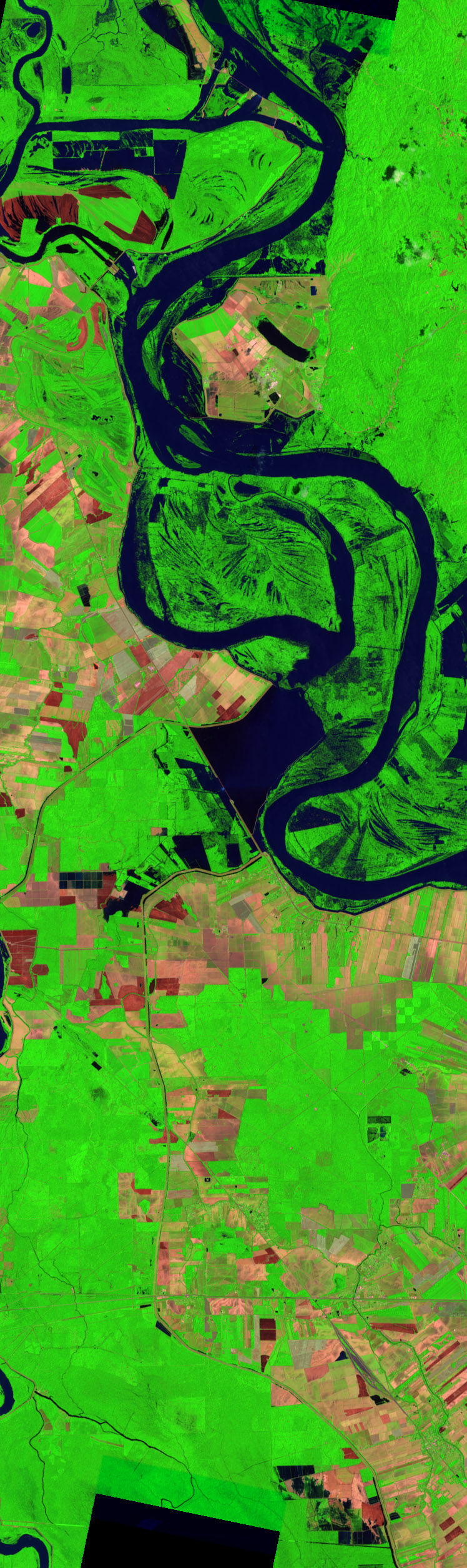
False colour satellite image of the Floodway on May 15, 2011.

=== Third opening of gates (2019; cancelled) ===
On Wednesday May 22, 2019, the U.S. Army Corps of Engineers announced that, due to the extended flood event on the Mississippi River, which had been above flood stage since January 2019, they were anticipating the third opening of the Morganza Spillway. The further anticipated river rise stoked fears that the waters would overtop the spillway, which would destroy the structure. On Monday May 27, 2019, the Army Corps of Engineers officially announced it would open Morganza on Sunday, June 2, 2019.

However, the US Army Corps of Engineers New Orleans issued a press release on May 30, 2019, announcing the postponement of the Spillway opening until June 6, 2019. The opening was later postponed again to June 9, then indefinitely.

== See also ==
- West Atchafalaya Floodway
