= 124th Transportation Command =

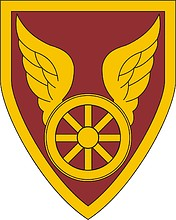
- Active: 1966-1972
- Country: United States
- Branch: US Army
- Type: Transportation
- Size: Command
- Garrison/HQ: Cam Ranh Bay, Vietnam

Commanders
- Notable commanders: Lt. Col. Richard E. Criner (1968)

The 124th Transportation Command (Terminal A) was a unit of the US Army stationed at Cam Ranh Bay beginning in 1966-1972. The Commands mission was the operation of the port as well as moving cargo inland to US units in the field.

The Command earned a Meritorious Unit Commendation June 1967.

== Subordinate Units ==
Headquarters and Headquarters Company 124th Transportation Command

- 10th Transportation Battalion
  - 97th Transportation Company (Heavy Boat)
  - 123rd Transportation Company (Terminal Service)
  - 155th Transportation Company (Terminal Service)
  - 458th Transportation Company (LARC V)
  - 870th Transportation Company (Terminal Service)
  - 1097th Transportation Company (Medium Boat)
- 24th Transportation Battalion
  - 24th Transportation Company (Light Truck)
  - 172nd Transportation Company (Medium Truck)
  - 442nd Transportation Company (Medium Truck)
  - 515th Transportation Company (Light Truck)
  - 529th Transportation Company (Light Truck)
  - 566th Transportation Company (Medium Truck)
  - 592nd Transportation Company (Light Truck)
  - 670th Transportation Company (Medium Truck)

Marine Maintenance Activity Vietnam (MMAV)
