= Vũng Rô Bay incident =

Part of the Vietnam War (1965)

Coordinates: 12°52′N 109°26′E

Vung Ro Bay incident
- Part of the Vietnam War
- Location of Vũng Rô Bay
Date	16 February 1965
Location	Vũng Rô Bay, South Vietnam
Result	South Vietnamese victory

Belligerents
South Vietnam	North Vietnam

The Vũng Rô Bay incident refers to the discovery of a 100-ton North Vietnamese naval trawler attempting to unload supplies and munitions on a beach in South Vietnam's Vũng Rô Bay on 16 February 1965. The incident spurred further United States Navy involvement in the Vietnam War.

== Incident ==
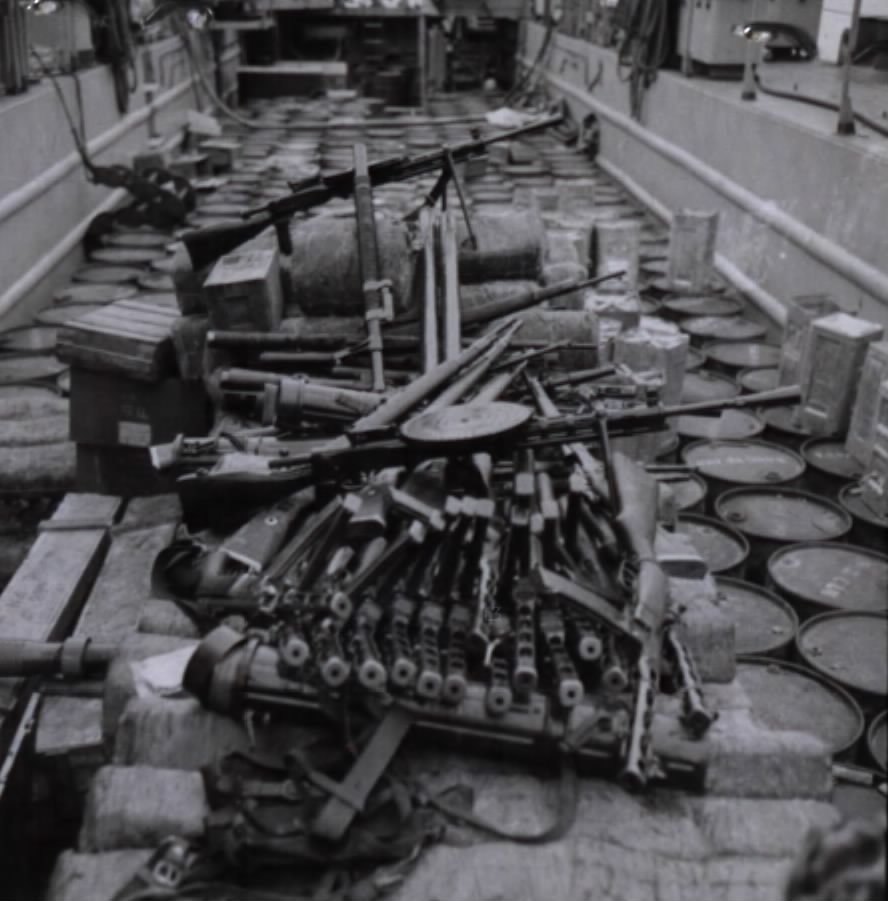
Weapons and munitions captured, 16 February 1965

On 16 February 1965, 1st Lt. James S. Bowers, a United States Army officer flying a MEDEVAC helicopter along the coast of central South Vietnam spotted a naval trawler camouflaged with trees and bushes perpendicular to the shore. Cargo was being unloaded and stacked on the beach at Vung Ro, an isolated bay on the rocky coast. The pilot immediately radioed his sighting to Lieutenant Commander Harvey P. Rodgers, the Senior Advisor to the South Vietnamese 2nd Coastal District headquartered in Nha Trang, who in turn notified the coastal district commander, Lieutenant Commander Ho Van Ky Thoai.

Commander Ho confirmed that no friendly troops were in the vicinity and dispatched Republic of Vietnam Air Force A-1 Skyraiders to the bay where they capsized and sank the trawler. Additional air strikes pummeled the stores on the beach the next day, but it was not until 1100 hours on the 19th that the South Vietnamese escort Chi Lang II (HQ 08), medium landing ship Tien Giang (HQ 405), and submarine chaser Tuy Dong (HQ 04) were able to overcome command indecision and enemy small arms fire from entrenched Viet Cong machine gunners to land their embarked troops and naval commandos. The commandos used shotguns to sweep the defending Viet Cong fighters from their concrete bunkers.

What the soldiers and naval commandos, the latter accompanied by their United States Navy advisor, Lieutenant Franklin W. Anderson, discovered in the wrecked ship and piled up on shore ended a long-running debate among American military and intelligence officials. The allies recovered from the 130-foot North Vietnamese trawler and from shore sites 100 tons of Soviet and Chinese-made war material, including 3,500 to 4,000 rifles and submachine guns, one million rounds of small arms ammunition, 1,500 grenades, 2,000 mortar rounds, and 500 pounds of explosives. (Note: Cutler cites the incident as happening on 3 March 1965. Most other sources cite 16 February 1965.)

For years many American analysts had suspected that the Communists were using the sea to supply their forces in the South, but it was not until the Vung Ro event that they gained positive proof of such actions. The United States Seventh Fleet commander, Vice Admiral Paul Blackburn, observed that the Vung Ro find was "proof positive". Blackburn and General William Westmoreland called for a major U.S.-Vietnamese anti-infiltration patrol operation.

== See also ==
- Action of 1 March 1968
- Operation Market Time
- Ships of the Republic of Vietnam Navy
- Vietnam People's Navy
