= West Atchafalaya Floodway =

Flood control structure in Louisiana, US

Coordinates: 30.7610°N 91.8690°W

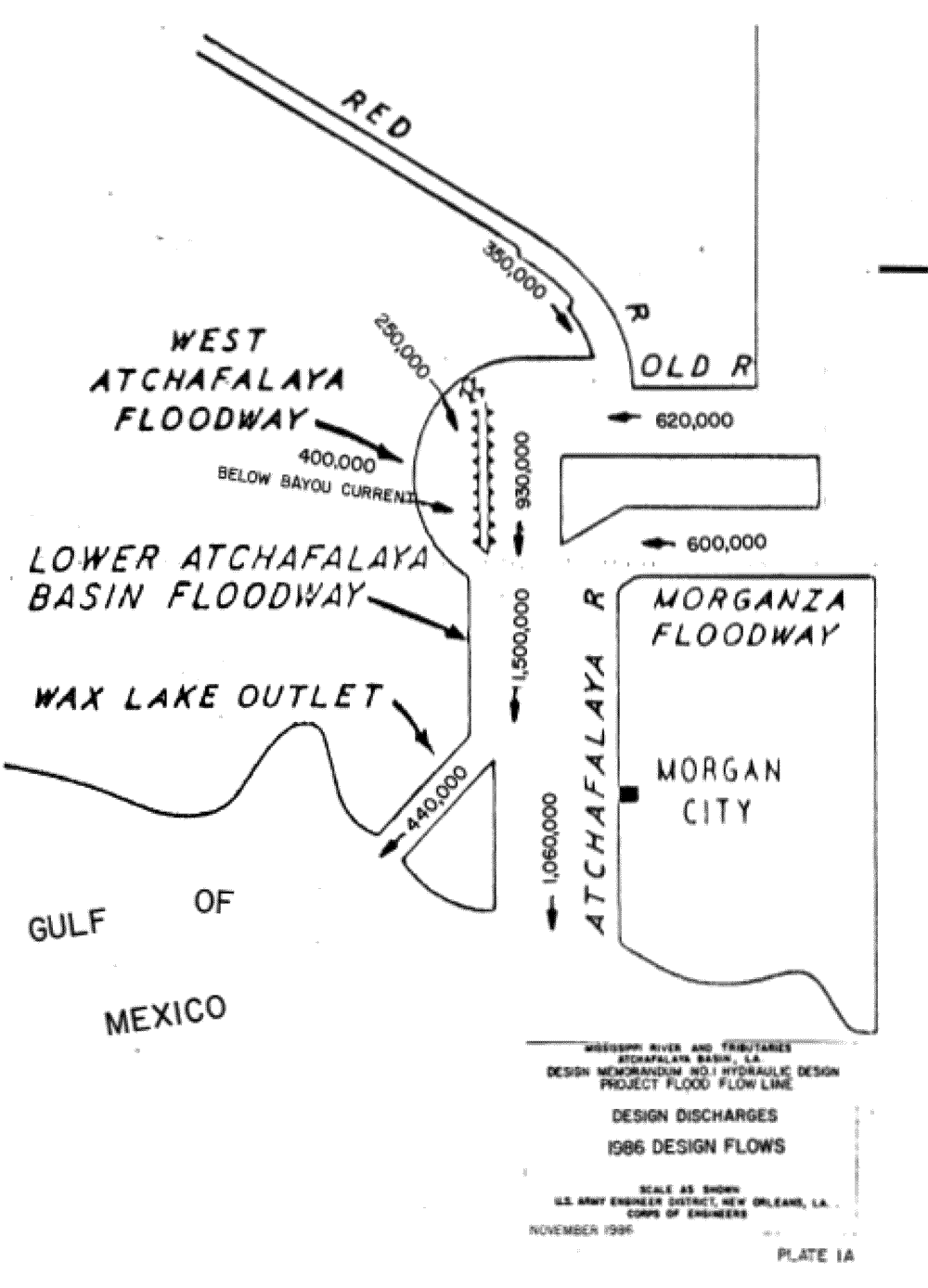
Project design flood flows for the Atchafalaya Basin in thousands of cubic feet per second.

The West Atchafalaya Floodway is a flood control structure of the Mississippi River and Tributaries Project located in the Lower Atchafalaya Basin in south-central Louisiana. It has a project design flood flow capacity of 250,000 cu ft/s (7,100 m^{3}/s).

== Atchafalaya Basin floodways ==
The Atchafalaya Basin system comprises three floodways. Two of these, the West Atchafalaya Floodway and the Morganza Floodway, are at the northern end. Together with the Atchafalaya River, these floodways are designed to pass flood waters into the third component, the Lower Atchafalaya Basin Floodway, which is 833,000 acres (3,370 km^{2}) in size and is bounded on the north by U.S. Route 190, on the east and west by the Atchafalaya Basin protection levees, and on the south by the Gulf of Mexico. Farther downstream, floodwaters enter the Gulf of Mexico through the Atchafalaya River below Morgan City, Louisiana and the Wax Lake Outlet.

== See also ==
- Mississippi River floods
- Bonnet Carré Spillway
- Old River Control Structure
