= The Rocks, Inc. =

Military-related African-American membership organization

- Founded: October 9, 1974; 51 years ago
- Founded at: Washington, D.C.
- Type: United States military support organization
- Purpose: Concern, Dedication, Professionalism
- Headquarters: P.O. Box 471212
- Location: Forestville, Maryland, United States
- Members: 1,100+
- Publication: The Rocket
- Website: http://www.rocksinc.org Official Website

The Rocks Incorporated (Rocks, Inc.), was founded on October 9, 1974 by sixty-five United States Army officers in Washington, D.C. Headquartered in Forestville, Maryland and with over 1,100 members, it is the largest professional military officers’ organization with a majority African-American membership.

The Rocks, Inc. is a non-profit organization composed primarily of African American active, reserve, retired and former commissioned officers and warrant officers of the U.S. Armed Forces, and widows and widowers of deceased members. The organization hosts professional development sessions and social events to improve the officer corps.

The Chairperson of the Board is Brigadier General Earl Simms, United States Army (Retired).

== History ==
The Rocks, Inc. began in the mid-1960s as an informal meeting of Army officers assigned to the Command and General Staff College at Fort Leavenworth, Kansas. The group initially met to help each other "survive" at Fort Leavenworth, and many members continued to meet after being reassigned to the Pentagon and elsewhere in the greater Washington, D.C., area.

In the years that followed, the group grew. On October 9, 1974, along with Colonel Robert B. Burke, General Roscoe Cartwright led an initiative to formally organize the growing network. They dubbed themselves the No Name Club until they agreed on a formal name. On December 1, the No Name Club had assembled to ratify an official name. That evening they learned that General Cartwright and his wife, Gloria, had died in a plane crash near Dulles Airport.

The No Name Club soon voted to name itself The Rocks, Inc. and established the Roscoe C. Cartwright Scholarship Fund in their namesake’s honor. Today, The Rocks, Inc. has 23 active chapters across the Army (including one in Iraq).

== Membership ==
Membership is open to the following: active duty, retired, and former officers and warrant Officers of the U.S. Armed Forces and its reserve and National Guard components including U.S. Coast Guard officers and warrant officers who were assigned duties with the Department of Defense.

== National Programs ==
R.C. Cartwright Scholarship Fund Rocks, Inc. administers and is the executor of the R.C. Cartwright Scholarship Fund. Annually, the fund recognizes college Reserve Officers Training Corps cadets academic achievement and require financial assistance to continue their educational endeavors. The cadets must be nominated by their professor of military science.

Leadership Outreach The Leadership Outreach Program is designed to assist students in successfully transitioning from college to the active military. Teams of 3-5 officers visit over 20 historically black colleges and universities (HBCU) annually. The teams are typically led by a general officer or colonel. The outreach team presents seminars to ROTC cadets on Army socialization, evaluation systems, and financial management for newly commissioned officers.

Rocks 5-miler Annually, the Washington, D.C. Chapter of the Rocks, Inc. host a 5-miler race a Burke Lake Park in Virginia. Proceeds are for the R.C. Cartwright Scholarship Fund.
