= Livestock source verification =

Livestock source verification is the ability to trace livestock from birth to the consuming public. This process usually entails numeric identification at birth and record keeping which details health records, feed records, and genetic history of individual livestock. The record keeping and traceability process continues from slaughter through processing and distribution. These records can be accessed by the processor which provides another level of safety to the consumer in terms of recall if necessary. Unique numbers are usually assigned to all cows, with most activities being documented.

== Benefits of livestock source verification ==
Source verification allows record keeping of livestock including health records, feed records, and genetic history. In the event of a recall, another level of safety is provided to the customers through the depth of the records.
