= Emergency Communities =

Emergency Communities was a volunteer organization which formed after Hurricane Katrina in 2005. It provided meals and other relief to residents and emergency responders, first in Mississippi, then in Louisiana. Emergency Communities ran sites in St. Bernard Parish, Plaquemines Parish, and Orleans Parish's Lower Ninth Ward, and then closed its doors on Thanksgiving of 2007. Nonprofit organization lowernine.org took the reins with regard to Emergency Communities' rebuild work, and continues to work on Eldorado Street rebuilding homes for residents of this devastated community. As of June 2009, lowernine.org has rebuilt twenty homes, in addition to working on hundreds of projects large and small across the community.

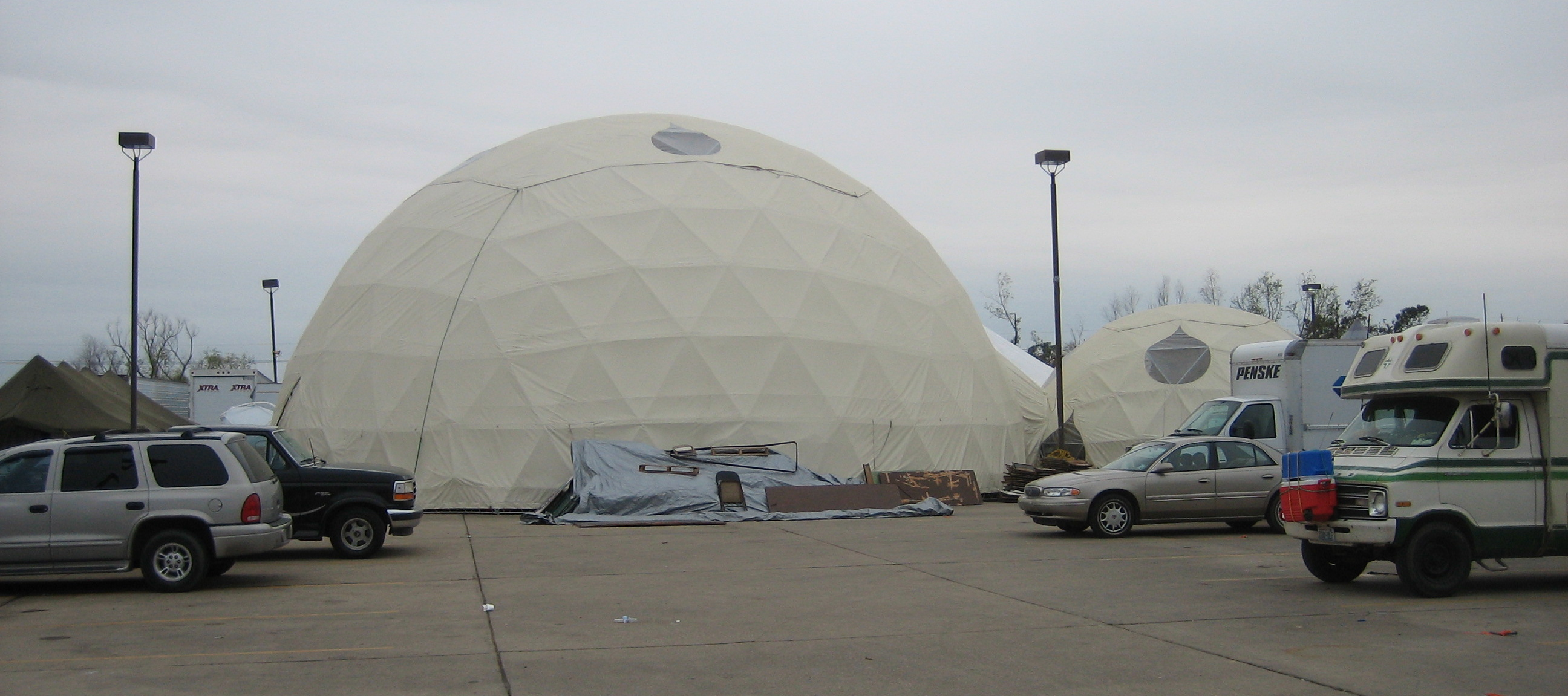
Geodesic domes of the Emergency Communities "tent city" in devastated St. Bernard Parish, Louisiana

Emergency Communities began with assistance from the International Humanities Center, which provided 501[c](3) fiscal sponsorship. Many key Emergency Communities volunteers met at the New Waveland Cafe & Clinic in Waveland, Mississippi. This cafe provided meals, medical services and free goods for local residents. On 1 December 2005, the café closed its location, which was located in the parking lot of Fred's Department Store on U.S. Route 90 in Waveland. In November, Emergency Communities was incorporated. By 12 December the group had begun serving meals in a parking lot in Arabi, Louisiana, just outside New Orleans. This operation, dubbed the Made With Love Café, continued through June 2006. It provided up to 1,400 meals per day to government workers, relief workers and returning residents in and around St. Bernard Parish, the civil parish where the café was located. The site, formerly an off-track betting parlor, became recognizable by its large tents and geodesic dome.

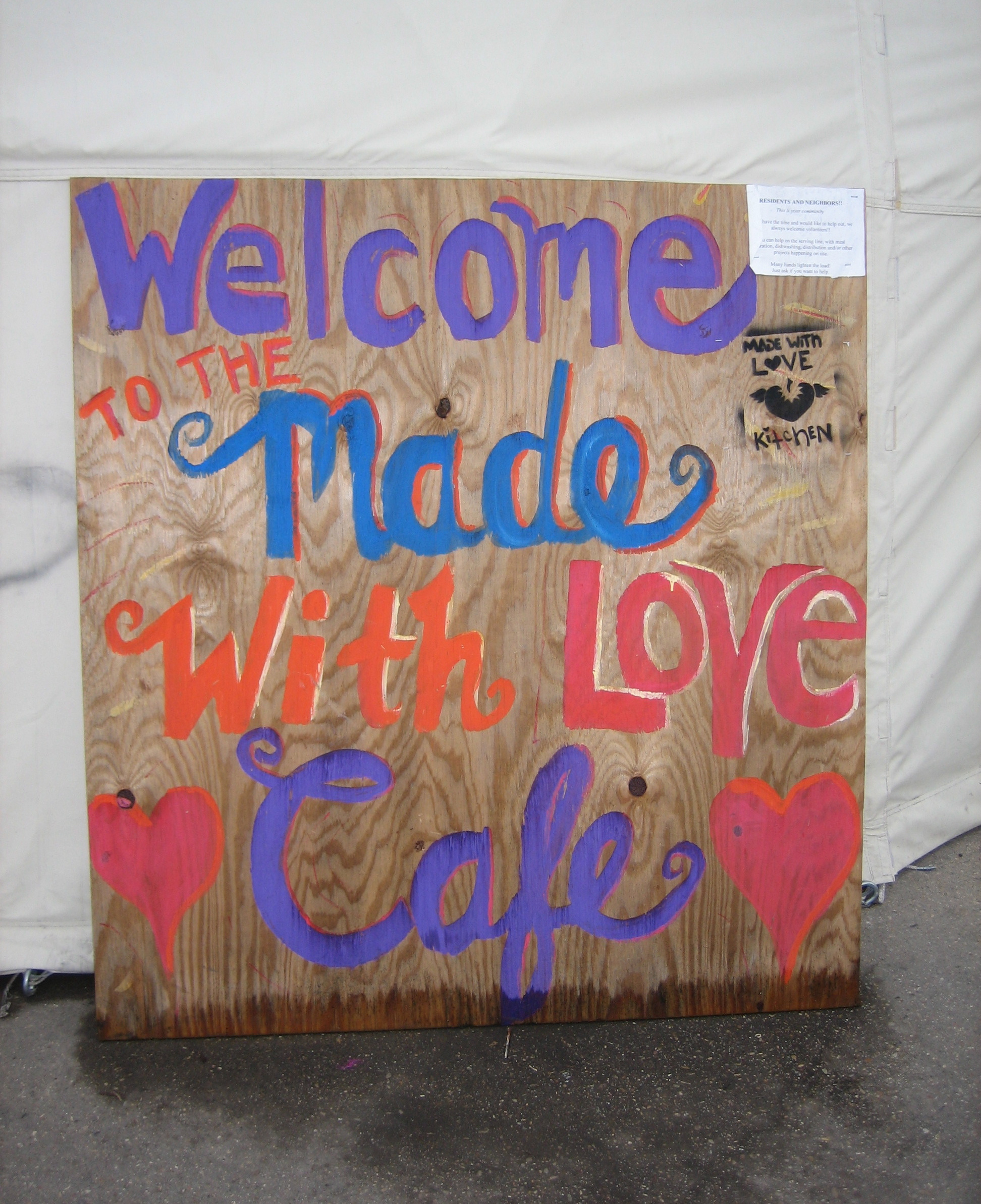
Sign outside tent where meals are served

Over the course of its two years, Emergency Communities' sites hosted over 4,000 unique volunteers, including approximately 300 from AmeriCorps/NCCC or others supported by grants from the Corporation for National and Community Service. The organization also raised over $10 million in donations for the relief effort, including from Oxfam, the Red Cross, the United Way, and hundreds of individuals across the country. Its major corporate sponsors included Sanderson Farms Chicken, Organic Valley, and Domino Sugar. Together, its volunteers served over 350,000 meals to over 50,000 unique residents, and gutted and helped rebuild hundreds of homes. Among the additional services it provided over this period were laundry, daycare, food, clothing and household goods distribution, naturopathic healthcare, including massage and therapy, and warm, welcoming places to recover from the trauma of the storm.

On 1 June 2006, Emergency Communities shut down its outdoor operation in St. Bernard Parish. As part of its exit strategy the nonprofit Community Center of St Bernard in Arabi, was founded. Using its Community Connections Model, the center currently helps more than 5,300 clients every year receive basic resources like food, clothes, legal aid, basic medical care, computer classes, financial literacy programs, senior citizen employment training, income tax preparation, information and referrals, and much more. On the same date, Emergency Communities served its first meal at a new location in Buras, Louisiana. On June 30, 2007, Emergency Communities closed the Y-Cafe in Buras and redeployed its resources to the Ninth Ward in New Orleans. A new organization, People for Plaquemines, carried on the mission of rebuilding lower Plaquemines Parish.

Emergency Communities no longer accepts volunteers on the Gulf Coast. However, its sister organization, lowernine.org, is continuing the work of rebuilding in the Lower Ninth Ward.

== See also ==
- Burners Without Borders
- Camp Hope
