= Brad Stone =

Brad or Bradley Stone may refer to:

- Brad Stone (journalist) (born 1971), American journalist and writer
- Brad "Baruch" Stone, set up New Waveland Clinic, a temporary emergency clinic
- Bradley William Stone, perpetrator of the 2014 Montgomery County shootings

== See also ==
- Stone (surname)
