= Bill Cheng =

Chinese-American writer (born 1983)

- Born: 1983 (age 42–43); Queens, New York
- Occupation: Author

Bill Cheng (born 1983) is a Chinese-American writer. He is best known for his novel Southern Cross The Dog. It follows the story of a boy who survives the Great Mississippi Flood of 1927 and then spends several decades as a refugee, an abandoned orphan and then an itinerant laborer. Cheng is known for his sardonic sense of humor and holds an MFA in writing at Hunter College.

== Books ==
- Cheng, Bill (9 May 2013). Southern Cross the Dog. Pan Macmillan. ISBN 9781447224914.
