= Mound Landing, Mississippi =

- Ghost town
- Location within the state of Mississippi Mound Landing, Mississippi (the United States)
- Coordinates: 33°36′26″N 91°07′37″W
- Country: United States
- State: Mississippi
- County: Bolivar
- Elevation: 135 ft (41 m)
- Time zone: UTC-6 (Central (CST))
  - Summer (DST): UTC-5 (CDT)
- GNIS feature ID: 692087

Mound Landing is a ghost town in Bolivar County, Mississippi, United States.

The settlement was located at Choctaw Bend on the Mississippi River.

== History ==
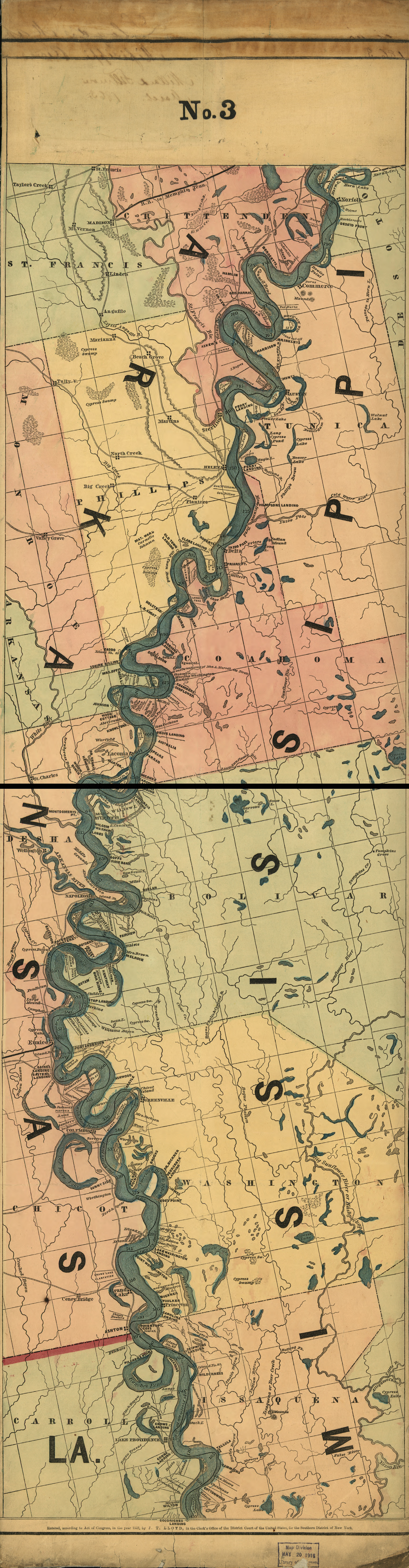
1862 map showing William Perkins' plantation

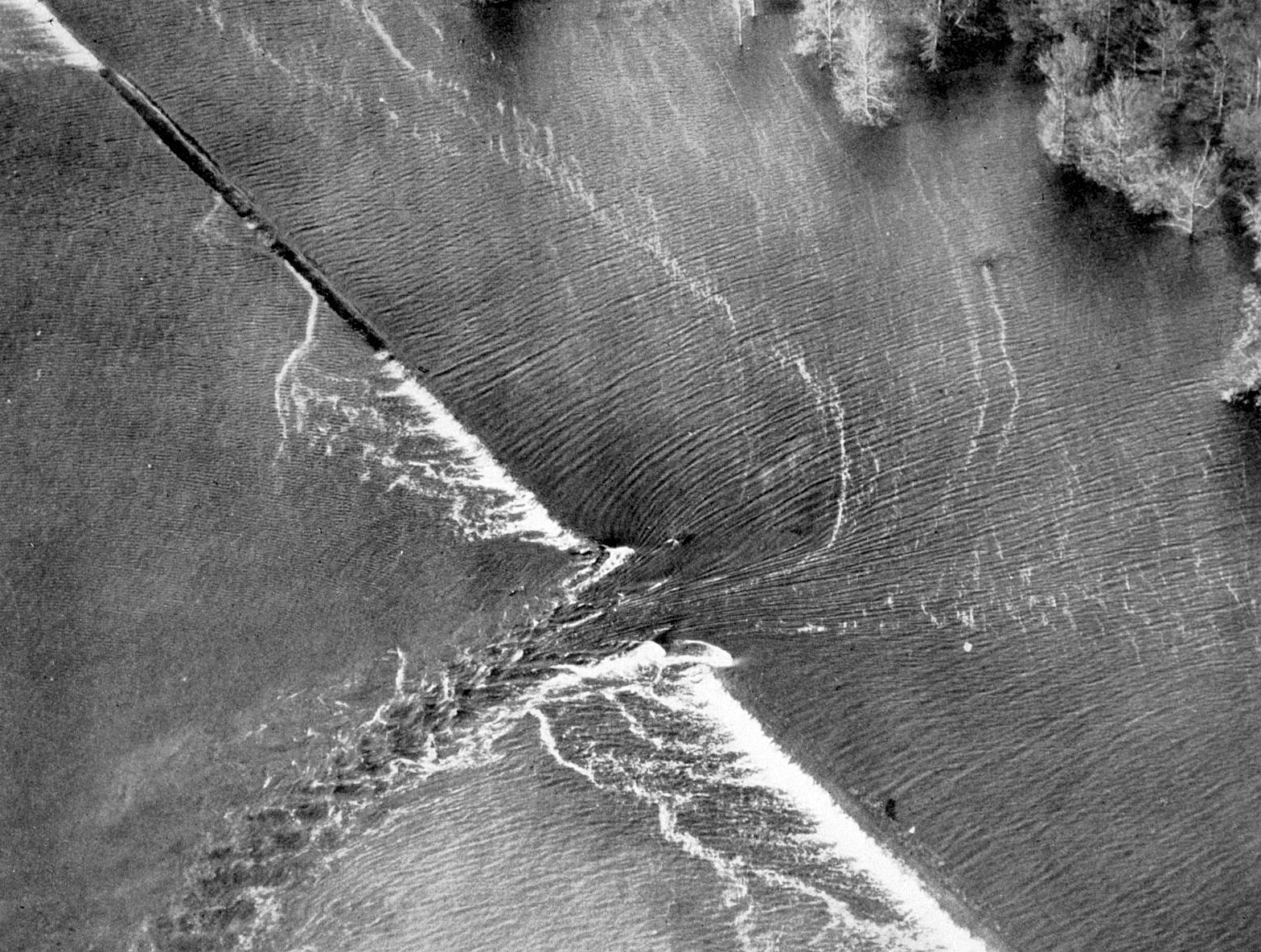
The Great Mississippi Flood of 1927 began at this break in the Mississippi River levee at Mound Landing.

The area was settled in 1840 by William P. Perkins, who used slave labor to clear 2,000 acres (810 ha) of canebrakes on which he established Mound Plantation, a cotton plantation.

Mound Plantation and its river landing were named for three nearby Indian mounds.

Perkins eventually owned 3,200 acres (1,300 ha) of land at the settlement and, by 1850, was Bolivar County's largest land owner and one of the United States' largest slaveholders.

Mound Landing had a post office as early as 1880.

In 1886, the population of Mound Landing was 50.

A levee was erected in 1867 to protect the settlement from river flooding. The levee was locally financed, and subsequent improvements to the levee were made. A ferry landing was located at the settlement, with a ramp which permitted vehicles to pass over the top of the levee.

In April 1927, as water levels on the Mississippi River began to rise due to heavy rains, an unknown number of African American prisoners were brought in chains to Mound Landing by the National Guard to fill sandbags at gunpoint in an effort to reinforce the levee. On April 21, the levee at Mound Landing broke, killing at least 100 prisoners and carrying their bodies several miles from the settlement. The Great Mississippi Flood of 1927 was one of the most damaging floods in the United States, inundating 1,800 sq mi (4,700 km^{2}) of land in the Mississippi Delta, taking 246 lives, and displacing 700,000 people. A historic marker describing when "the Mississippi River broke the levee at Mound Landing" is located on Mississippi Highway 1, approximately 2.5 mi (4.0 km) east of the former settlement.

All that remains at Mound Landing is a boatramp located on private property owned by a hunting club.

== Notable people ==
- J. E. Halbert, member of the Mississippi House of Representatives (1888–1889) and Surgeon General for Mississippi (1889–1892)
