= J. E. Halbert =

American politician

J. E. Halbert (December 2, 1850 – August 28, 1892) was an American physician and politician.

Born in Greene County, Alabama, Halbert moved with his family to Scott County, Mississippi, with his family. He went to the public schools and received his medical degree from Jefferson Medical School. He then practiced medicine in Forest, Mississippi, and in Leota, Mississippi. Halbert served as president of the Mississippi State Medical Association in 1889 and 1890. He also lived in Mound Landing, Mississippi. Halbert served in the Mississippi House of Representatives in 1888 and 1889. He died in New Orleans, Louisiana from congestion of the brain.
