= Camp Hope =

Volunteer base camp

Coordinates: 29.965°N 89.999°W

Camp Hope is a volunteer base camp located in a former school in St. Bernard Parish, Louisiana. Camp Hope has welcomed people from all over the United States and all over the world who have come to participate in the massive recovery efforts of St. Bernard Parish and New Orleans in the aftermath of Hurricane Katrina and Hurricane Rita and the Deepwater Horizon oil spill.

Camp Hope provides affordable housing and meals for groups and individuals who have come to serve St Bernard parish and the city of New Orleans. Breakfast and dinner are served throughout the work week, as well as the option to make sack lunches to take on volunteer work sites. The facilities include a large dining area, bathrooms, showers, laundry facilities, meeting rooms, and bunk rooms with enough space to sleep over 300 individuals.

== Formation ==
Camp Hope opened on June 1, 2006, in the former "W. Smith Junior Elementary School" in Violet, Louisiana due to the closure of Camp Premiere, a FEMA-sponsored base camp established to provide basic life support for emergency response activities. Col. David Dysart (USMCR), the Director of The St. Bernard Parish Office of Recovery, formed alliances with multiple Non-Profit Organizations, volunteer groups and the St. Bernard School Board to relocate the camp and ensure the continued support necessary for the critical volunteer efforts to continue. The opening was facilitated by several AmeriCorps National Civilian Community Corps teams and overseen by St. Bernard Parish employee Tom Pfalzer.

The mission of Camp Hope then, in addition to providing low-cost volunteer housing, was to facilitate volunteer relief efforts in St. Bernard Parish and in the New Orleans area. This effort included managing and participating in the removal of health and safety hazards internal to residential properties throughout St. Bernard Parish (gutting houses i.e. removing rotting furniture, drywall, kitchen appliances that held biohazards as well as more ordinary hazards such as mercury switches used in thermostats and household chemicals) and facilitate repatriation by displaced residents as a cost-effective alternative to unnecessary demolition, with the assistance of the local, state, federal, NCCC, and other volunteer and non-governmental agencies. At the end of the debris removal process, volunteers in St. Bernard had gutted over 2,500 homes in St. Bernard Parish at no cost to their owners.

In January 2007, Camp Hope changed its mission to focus on rebuilding and new construction. Camp Hope was managed by the New Orleans Area Habitat for Humanity affiliate of Habitat for Humanity International. August 15, 2007, Camp Hope moved to the former "Beauregard Middle School" which was named after P.G.T. Beauregard, a notable Civil War General who fought for the Confederacy, in the township of St. Bernard, LA. Most volunteers who stay at Camp Hope volunteer with New Orleans Area Habitat for Humanity or with the St. Bernard Project (located in Chalmette, LA) though any volunteer is welcome.

In January 2010, Camp Hope reopened under St. Bernard Parish management at a new location in Arabi LA, inside the building of former St. Louise de Marillac. In the spring of 2011, as a result of the Deepwater Horizon oil spill the former Camp Hope was re-purposed to house clean-up workers.

In 2012, St. Bernard Parish Government decided to pull out of the management of Camp Hope. In February 2012, a local non-profit called The Gathering took over the management of Camp Hope.

On June 1, 2023 operations of Camp Hope were transferred to CrossRoads Missions New Orleans, another non-profit that has been working with volunteers since Katrina.

== Versions ==
Camp Hope 2 in Beauregard Middle School closed in May 2009. Camp Hope to close after providing a temporary home to thousands who helped Camp Hope 3 is run jointly by volunteers and the St. Bernard Parish government.

Camp Hope 3, which opened on January 1, 2010, was located in the building of a former Catholic school located in Arabi, Louisiana.

Camp Hope 3 was closed in June 2010 and the space was turned over to house BP employees who worked to clean up the oil spill in the Gulf of Mexico. BP has spent $600,000 on renovations to house 300 oil spill personnel in 2010.

Camp Hope 3 opened again in March 2011 in what was previously a school and is located in Arabi, Louisiana

In February 2012, Camp Hope 3 was taken under new management by The Gathering, a non-profit in Arabi, Louisiana.

== See also ==
- Emergency Communities
