= Caernarvon, Louisiana =

Caernarvon
- Unincorporated community
- Location of Caernarvon in Louisiana Caernarvon (the United States)
- Coordinates: 29°51′50″N 89°54′23″W
- Country: United States
- State: Louisiana
- Parish: St. Bernard Parish
- Time zone: UTC-6 (CST)
  - Summer (DST): UTC-5 (CDT)

Caernarvon is an historic unincorporated community in St. Bernard Parish, Louisiana, United States. It is now often considered to be part of the town of Poydras, Louisiana.

The name of the community is from a plantation originally located here. The plantation's name is widely believed to be from a similarly named town and castle in Wales. Names of antebellum plantations in the American South were often reflective of European roots and aspirations of grandeur; two upriver Mississippi River plantations, Nottoway near White Castle, Louisiana, and Sans Souci near Osceola, Arkansas, are two examples of this tradition.

== History ==
It is widely known for its role in the Great Mississippi Flood of 1927. Several tons of dynamite were used to destroy the levee in hopes of preventing damage to the city of New Orleans. However, this effort became less than fruitful when the levee system was breached in several other areas to the north, preventing the flood waters from threatening New Orleans. It did cause major destruction in St. Bernard and Plaquemines Parishes.

== Flood control ==
There are several flood control systems on the Mississippi River. The Bonnet Carre Spillway was built in response to the flood of 1927. Farther downriver, the Bohemia Spillway, started in 1924 and completed in 1926 just before the flood, was one of the earliest attempts to protect New Orleans from floods.

=== Diversion projects ===
Several diversion projects have been planned and implemented since the beginning of 1990, not only for flood control but for marshland rehabilitation.

==== Caernarvon Freshwater Diversion ====
The Caernarvon Freshwater Diversion, located 15 miles (24 km) south of New Orleans, was built in 1991 at a cost of $25.9 million around the site of the destroyed levee. The diversion was designed and constructed with five 15 feet gates, allowing up to 8000 cfs of river diversion to gravity flow into a conveyance canal. The canal runs to the Big Mar pond but also drains into Bayou Mandeville, Lake Lery, and the Delacroix Canal, which then flows into Oak River, and has created the Caernarvon Delta.

==== Davis Pond Freshwater diversion canal ====
The success of the Caernarvon Freshwater Diversion, has led to the construction of other flood control structures including the $106 million Davis Pond Freshwater Diversion Structure. Construction began in 1997 and was completed in 2004 providing sediments and nutrients to the Barataria Bay estuary ultimately benefiting 777,000 acres of marshes and bays.

==== Other projects ====
In 1903 Bayou Lafourche was cut off from the Mississippi. In the 1950s a pumping/siphon station was installed delivering 200 cfs. The lack of fresh water affected the natural hydrology and allowed salt water intrusion that in turn affected drinking water. In 2001 the Bayou Lafourche Diversion design, phase I "Design Report, Mississippi River Water Reintroduction Into Bayou Lafourche" was approved to study a diversion project. This would result in a draft feasibility report, a continuation of the $1,000,000 report issued in September 1998, and the projects head work structure would be in Donaldsonville, Ascension Parish, providing a year-round flow of 1,000 cfs. The project was sponsored by the U.S. Environmental Protection Agency, the Louisiana Coastal Protection and Restoration Authority (CPRA) and run by the U.S. Army Corps of Engineers. This part of the project has currently been "de-authorized". In March 2006 the Final Phase 2 Design Report, Mississippi River Water Reintroduction Into Bayou Lafourche was published. In 2008 Hurricane Gustav was devastating to Bayou Lafourche. As a result of Hurricane Gustav, the CPRA implemented The Emergency Bayou Channel Capacity Restoration Project. By November 2011 this project, that included dredging 5 miles (8.0 km) of Bayou Lafourche from Donaldsonville to Belle Rose. In 2012 the CPRA allocated $20 million to the Bayou Lafourche Fresh Water District, from the Coastal Impact Assistance Program, to implement State Project BA-0161 or "Phase 2", that is scheduled for completion in December 2016. Phase 2 includes 8.3 miles (13.4 km) of dredging between Belle Rose and Napoleonville, ending just north of LA 998. The project will increase the amount of fresh water into Bayou Lafourche, that will have a positive impact on the coastal wetlands by replenishing areas with a continuous supply of fresh water, and also by fighting the further encroachment of saltwater from the Gulf. As funding is obtained "post-Phase 2" will include dredging from Napoleonville to Thibodaux and other components.

== Education ==
Residents are zoned to schools in the St. Bernard Parish Public Schools.

As of 2007 Chalmette High School serves the population.
