= Chandeleur Sound =

Part of the Gulf of Mexico

Coordinates: 29°55′N 89°03′W

The Chandeleur Sound is a sound that lies between mainland Louisiana and the Chandeleur Islands in Saint Bernard Parish. It is situated east of Breton Sound and south of Mississippi Sound. It was formed by the mixing of the Gulf of Mexico and the waters of the Mississippi River, protected by the Islands.

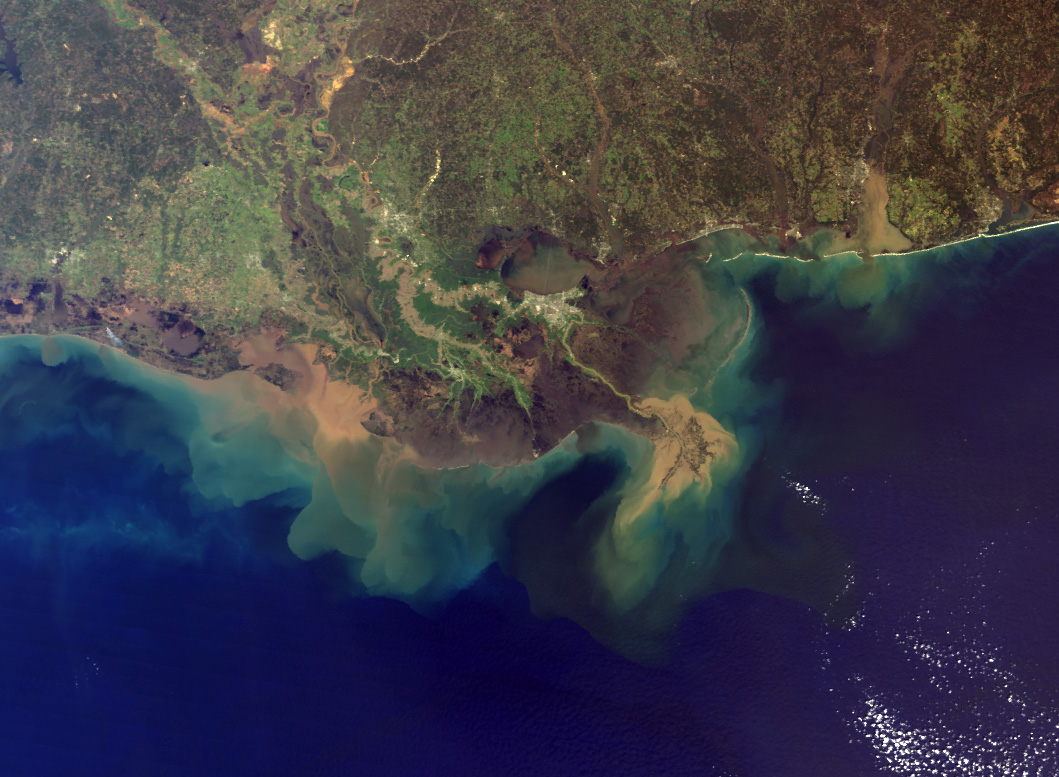
Mississippi River Delta with the Chandeleur Sound north of it

== Climate and geography ==
Similarly to the rest of Louisiana, the Sound experiences a semitropical climate. The average water temperatures range from 70˚F to 84˚F (21–29°C) by month and the humidity ranges between 73% and 84%. Due to the humidity, clouds often form overhead, reducing the amount of daily sunlight that the area receives to as little as 4 hours. The Sound is a part of the Breton National Wildlife Refuge and is situated near the Bayou Sauvage National Wildlife Refuge.

=== Hurricane Katrina effects ===
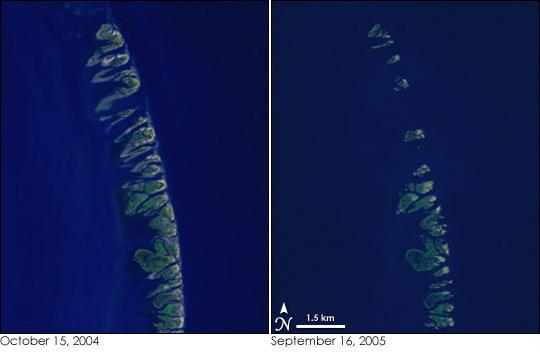
The left image is from before Hurricane Katrina and the right is from after, showing the reduction of the islands and exposure of the Sound to the Gulf.

In 2005, Hurricane Katrina made landfall as a category 3 hurricane and destroyed part of the Chandeleur Islands, exposing some of the Sound to the Gulf.

== Uses ==
The Sound has served a major purpose for a long time, including fishing, as it is located just outside of the New Orleans metropolitan area. The metro has an estimated population of 1,275,762 as of 2017 and has been served by the Sound since the area was settled in 1718.

=== Transportation ===
The Sound is accessible to fishermen in both Mississippi and Louisiana, the two states that border it. Because the Chandeleur Islands protect the Sound from rough seas, ships of all sizes can roam it. Most boats that enter the Sound are used for fishing.

=== Fishing ===
Fish is a primary export from the region, including Redfish and Speckled trout. The abundance of fish in the sound has helped the region flourish and thrive by allowing humans to settle as early as 1718, when the French arrived in New Orleans. Other fish that can be found in the Sound include, but are not limited to, Flounder, Bluefish, Spanish mackerel, Cobia, Tarpon and Jack crevalle. The prime fishing season is during the Summer. The city of New Orleans itself was founded in 1718 and the Sound has served it for over 300 years. However, fishing was banned across the Gulf Coast for a period of time after the 2010 oil spill, causing the industry to temporarily die out.

Oil Spill Fishery Closure Map

=== Further development ===
Nearby cities that have developed with help from the Sound include Gulfport, Mississippi, located about forty miles (64 km) north and New Orleans, Louisiana, which is about sixty miles (97 km) west. The Sound has helped both cities grow tremendously, due to the abundance of fish and the ability to travel the region with ease.

== Pollution ==
Pollution has been a major issue for the region in recent years that has caused wildlife to die as a result of waste being carried in the Mississippi River and oil spills in the region.

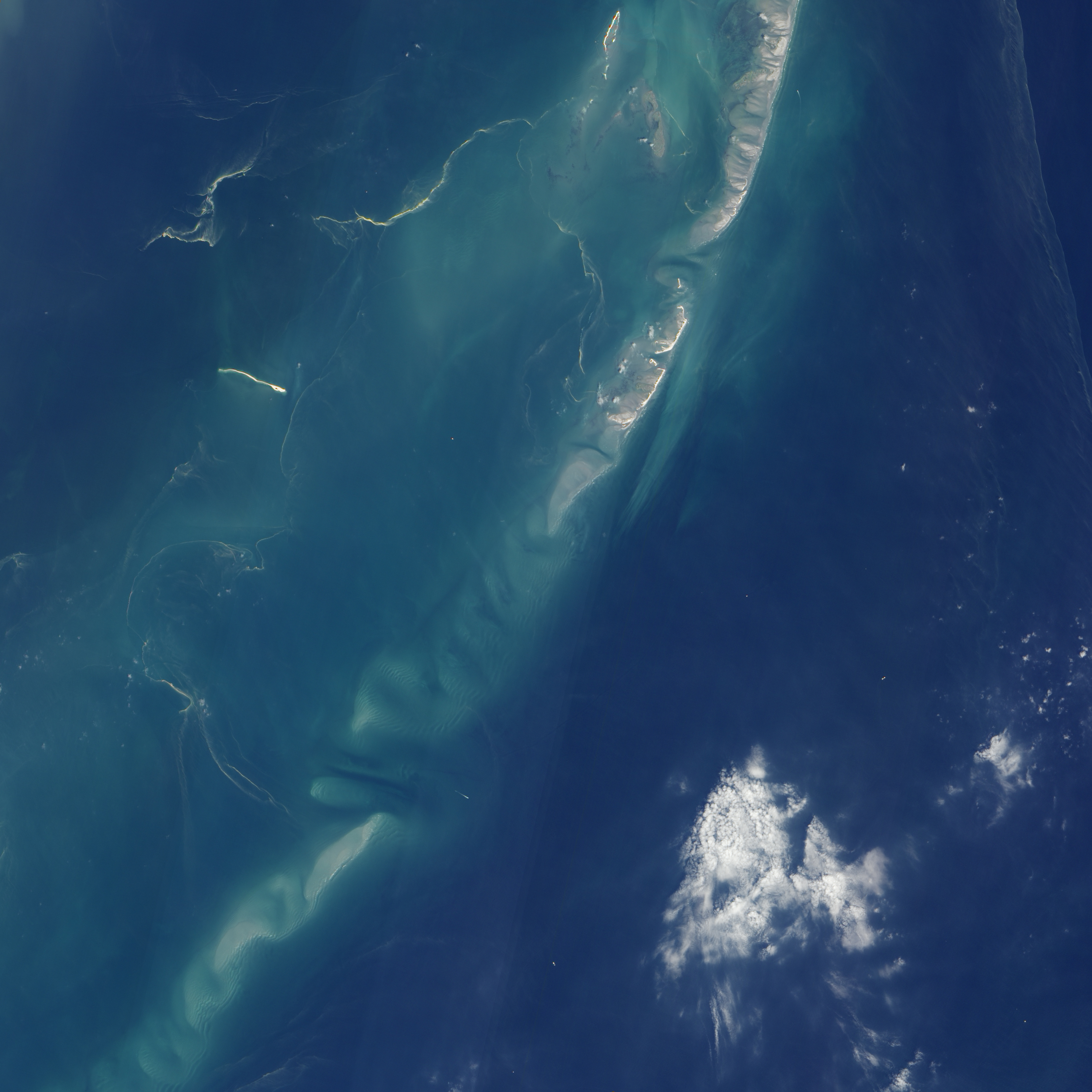
Oil Reaches Chandeleur Islands

=== 2010 oil spill ===
In 2010, the Deepwater Horizon, an oil–drilling machine, sprung a leak in the Gulf of Mexico. A reported 4.9 million barrels of oil were spilled off the coasts of Louisiana, Mississippi, Alabama, Florida and to a lesser extent, Texas. Louisiana's marshes were impacted heavily by the spill, which occurred just forty miles (64 km) off the coast of the state. More than 450 miles (720 km) of the Chandeleur Sound's coastline marshes were oiled and destroyed. The reduction of the marshes by cause of human activity accelerated rapidly after the spill.

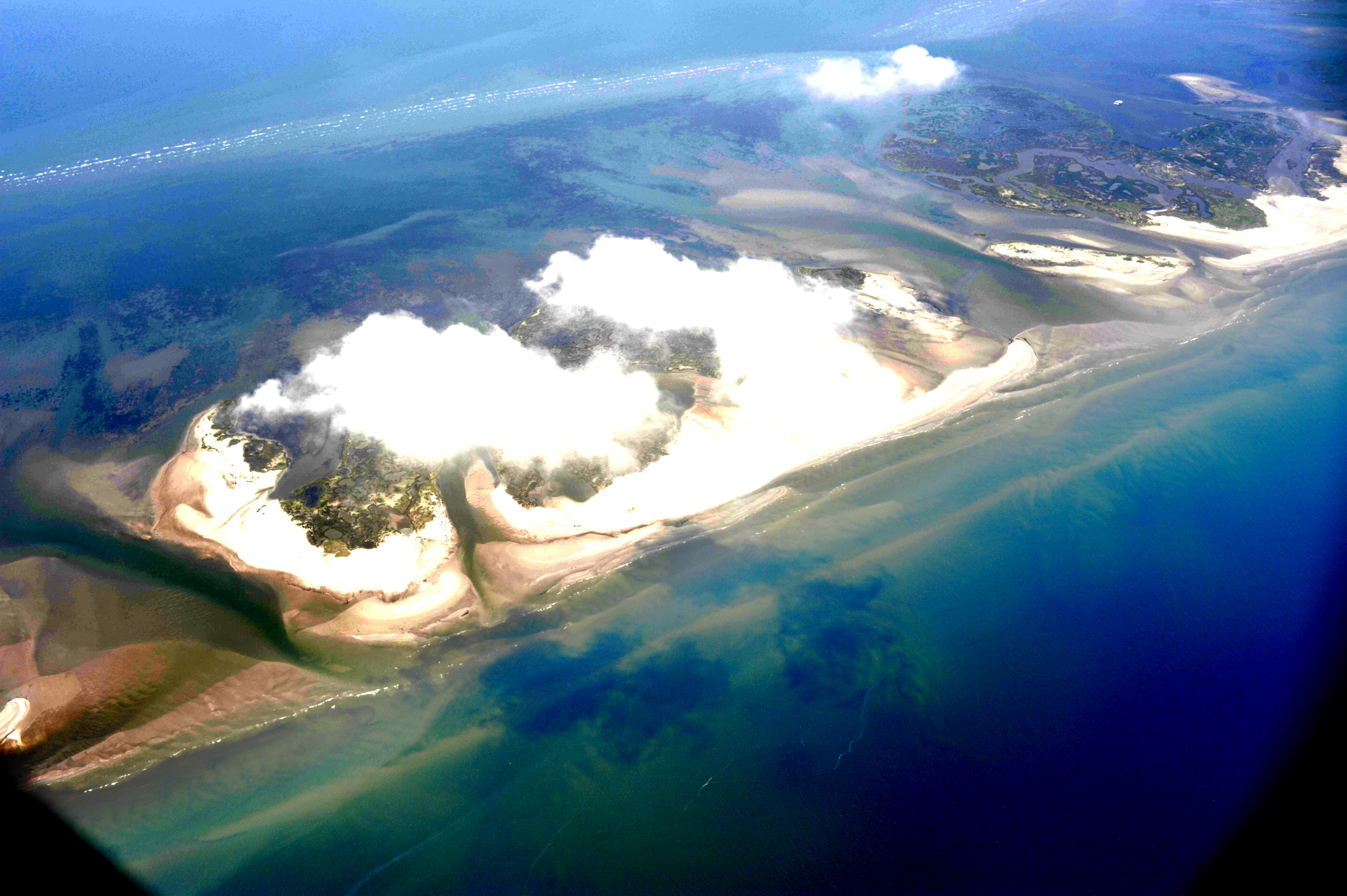
Oil slicks surround the Chandeleur Islands

=== Dead zones ===
In 2008, a dead zone was discovered by scientists in the Sound that grew extensively after the oil spill. The likely starting cause is waste nutrients being carried into the estuaries by the Mississippi River, although the oil made it worse. The dead zone appeared to be created by low amounts of oxygen in the region, known as hypoxic zones, as a result of phosphorus and nitrogen blocking out sunlight. It grows the most during the summer, when the flow of these nutrients is the highest.
