= Burners Without Borders =

Non-profit organization

- Founded: 2005
- Type: Non-profit, Charitable foundation
- Purpose: Humanitarian
- Location: United States
- Website: www.burnerswithoutborders.org

Burners Without Borders (BWB) is a community-led NGO which initiates civic works projects and disaster relief in local communities around the globe.

== Overview ==
Burners Without Borders formed in 2005 when Burners (Burning Man attendees) volunteered in the Hurricane Katrina disaster area. The group was originally named Temple to Temple Crew as they rebuilt a Vietnamese temple. The organization was renamed Burners Without Borders as volunteers continued to do Gulf Coast cleanup and help people rebuild their devastated communities. As the volunteer numbers grow, BWB has emerged to address projects globally. Efforts such as in Pisco, Peru a city hit by a magnitude 8.0 earthquake in the 2007 Peru earthquake, Burners Without Borders worked alongside 154 volunteers from 23 nations and such humanitarian groups as the International Committee of the Red Cross and Doctors Without Borders. In 2011 BWB participated in relief efforts in Japan, following the Fukushima disaster in the remote Tohoku Prefecture. Other efforts include building bottle schools in Guatemala, delivering relief supplies to Haiti and relief efforts to areas not receiving relief assistance in New Jersey following the devastation caused by Hurricane Sandy.

In 2015, BWB assisted in creating a Lake County tool-lending library for those who were effected by the 2015 California wildfires, worked with Communitere Nepal on setting up their 3rd location after the devastating Nepal Earthquake, and continued to support their growing chapter network. The long-time Executive Director Carmen Mauk also stepped down in 2015 and handed over the position to Christopher Breedlove.

In 2016, BWB participated in efforts involving the European Migrant Crisis, 2016 Louisiana floods, and the first Humanitarian Mini-Maker Faire in Kathmandu. Burners Without Borders also became involved with the Standing Rock Organic Composting Toilet Project, where they incubated Protectors Alliance, and produced the sanitation infrastructure for the Water Protectors to utilize throughout the winter.

Burners Without Borders became part of the Burning Man Project in 2015, a 501(c)(3) nonprofit organization.

== See also ==
- Emergency Communities
- Without Borders
