= Food distribution =

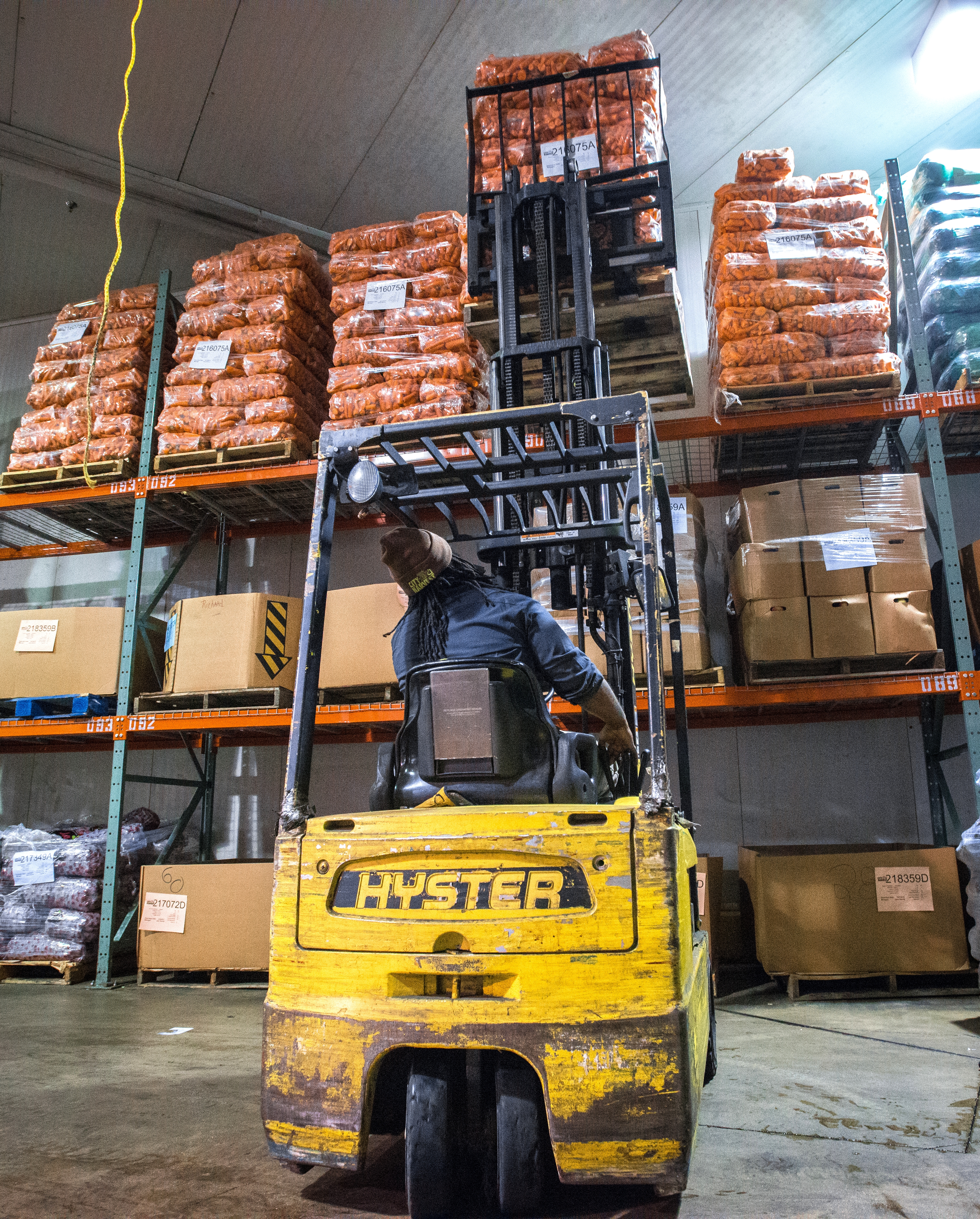
A man using a forklift to unload carrots from a refrigerated truck at a warehouse in Long Island City, New York

Food distribution is the process of transporting food products to reach consumers. It is part of the wider food system. The process and methodology behind food distribution varies by location. Food distribution has been a defining characteristic of human behavior in all societies, and recordings of food distribution date back for thousands of years. Most governments and societies are highly shaped by the systems created to support food distribution.

There are a multitude of risk factors that can affect food distribution. War, economic failure, political problems, and weather conditions all play a role in determining the efficiency of any food system. Two recent examples of war and economic failure impacting food distribution includes the decline of food distribution in Japan during World War II and food recession in Sub-Saharan Africa during the late 1970s and early 1980s. In both cases, food distribution was hindered and the population in these areas consequently suffered.

Special organizations exist today to prevent any total collapses in food distribution, assist in developing food distribution and food systems in underdeveloped areas, and respond to food distribution crises. At the international level, the Food and Agriculture Organization (FAO) plays a key role in facilitating the growth of food distribution systems all over the world. At the national level different countries have developed more complex support systems; by example, a mixture of federal, non-profit, and volunteer organizations function in the United States to safeguard the well-being of the US food distribution system. Within the United States, there is an issue of food insecurity where food distribution is one of the key solutions to target food insecurity. This creates a "food bank industry" where many organizations use tactics of business and trade skills within the food distribution sector to give food to communities that are in need.

== Around the world ==
=== United States ===
Modern food distribution in the United States is a result of continued growth since the 1960s. In an increasingly connected world, food distribution efforts in the US reach from coast to coast. A network of infrastructure, warehouses, factories, and commercial retailers comprise the bulk of US food distribution. It is estimated that food served in the United States may travel close to 1,500 miles between growers and consumers. While many products, specifically meat and grain, are distributed in different fashions, there are common trends to the distribution of most modern foods. An increase in the use of technology for farming has transformed the small local farm of the 1940s in to large production facilities. Several federal agencies, such as the US Department of Agriculture and the Food and Drug Administration, manage and sustain the productivity of the US food distribution system.

=== Latin America ===
Food distribution in Latin America is mainly dominated by large distributors and chains. Efforts have been made to compete with the industrialization of the food distribution system through the establishment of four types of organizations: consumer purchasing organizations, consumer cooperatives, voluntary chains, and retailer purchasing associations. Consumer purchasing organizations are groups of families who buy food together. The benefits of joining one of these organizations are the reduced cost and improved variety in diet that comes from purchasing food with other families. Consumer cooperatives differ from consumer purchasing organizations in that they are constituted by groups of individuals who work together to secure high quality food for low prices. The cooperatives are analogous to a food union that actively works to secure the rights of its consumers. Voluntary chains are organizations of privately owned retailers and food wholesalers who operate as one economic body. These groups form contracts to work under, but are economically independent of one another. Retailer purchasing organizations are groups of retailers who purchase products as though they were a single buyer. Members within these organizations are all involved in the purchasing of goods, but do not form contracts.

=== Global food distribution ===
Along with Archer Daniels Midland, Bunge, and Cargill, the Louis Dreyfus Company is one of the four "ABCD" companies that dominate world agricultural commodity trading.

== Risk factors affecting food distribution and examples of failed policy ==
Prominent risk factors that can affect the food distribution within a society include war, economic failure, political instability, and weather conditions. Each of these factors affects individual groups of people differently, but all share the common attribute of being detrimental to local food distribution and food systems. Two prominent examples of risk factors' negative effect on a society's food distribution system are the situation in Japan during World War II and Africa during the late 1970s and early 1980s.

=== Japan ===
Japanese food distribution drastically decreased from the effects of World War Two and the country's economic shortcomings. The need for food during the 1920s and 1930s rose drastically as Japan's population and average lifestyle increased. Japan was importing large amounts of rice, sugar, soybeans, and wheat from its colonies by 1935, and had a dependence on colonial possessions to distribute food to her people. 95% of Japanese rice between 1936 and 1938, just a few years before major conflict arose with the United States, was imported from its colonies in Korea and Formosa. Only 2% of Japan's rice came from foreign countries.

As war engulfed Japan after 1941, food distribution efforts began to suffer. Japan lost a tremendous amount of cargo ships and was surrounded by an effective US blockade for most of the war. Imports were down, which cut off Japan from its primary source of food. Rationing programs, ran by Japan's Central Foodstuff Corporation and Local Foodstuff Corporations, were an attempt to distribute food equally among the general population. Changes in tax collection and price control were also created to feed Japan, but these measures ultimately did not supply the Japanese people with enough food for survival. The average ration allowance consisted of a flour mixture which was often unhealthy and barely edible. Normal consumers age 16 to 60 received an average 330 g of ration per day in May 1943, and the situation only became more desperate as the war progressed. Rationing programs were reduced even further in July 1945, just before the war's end.

=== Sub-Saharan Africa ===
In Sub-Saharan Africa, the food distribution crisis of the 1970s and 1980s was a result of a multitude of food distribution risk factors including political problems, economic failures, and weather conditions. The heart of the political problems and economic failures affecting food distribution included poor agricultural pricing and a lack of state involvement with rural development. Some of the political problems can be traced back to the colonial period. Colonial policy supported the exportation of goods, even if it meant decreasing the amount of food for the local economy. Components of these colonial policies continued to be used after African countries gained their freedom from European nations. The usage of these failed policies caused malignant consequences on the economic situation of the peasant class, including the exploitation of peasant agriculture and in removal of peasants from their land. The weather and environmental issues regarding the Sub-Saharan African food distribution crisis also have roots in failed colonial policy. Labor migration cycles used during colonial times were ecologically damaging to the local environment and failed to create new areas for growing crops. As a result, desertification and a loss of soil fertility hurt the local agricultural sector, which then in turn negatively affected food distribution.

The world's farmers produce enough food to feed 12 billion people, but the inequal food distribution leaves hundreds of millions hungry.

== Food distribution organizations ==
=== The FAO ===
Logo of the Food and Agriculture Organization.

One of the largest organizations working to avoiding food distribution crises on the global stage in the Food and Agriculture Organization (FAO). The FAO is a branch of the United Nations, and actively works to improve food distribution in countries that need support

=== Organizations within the United States ===
==== Federal and large-scale ====
Several different organizations exist to mitigate and respond to food distribution crises in the United States. Prominent contributors to large-scale food distribution effort in the US include the Federal Emergency Management Agency (FEMA), United States Department of Agriculture (USDA), and Salvation Army. FEMA and the USDA work together during food distribution crises to coordinate the procurement and transportation of nonperishable food, water, and other resources to afflicted areas. The Salvation Army receives federal supplies from FEMA and the USDA, and then works on the local level to distribute necessary goods. All food given to civilians during a crisis is typically distributed at mass emergency feeding stations.

==== Volunteer and local ====
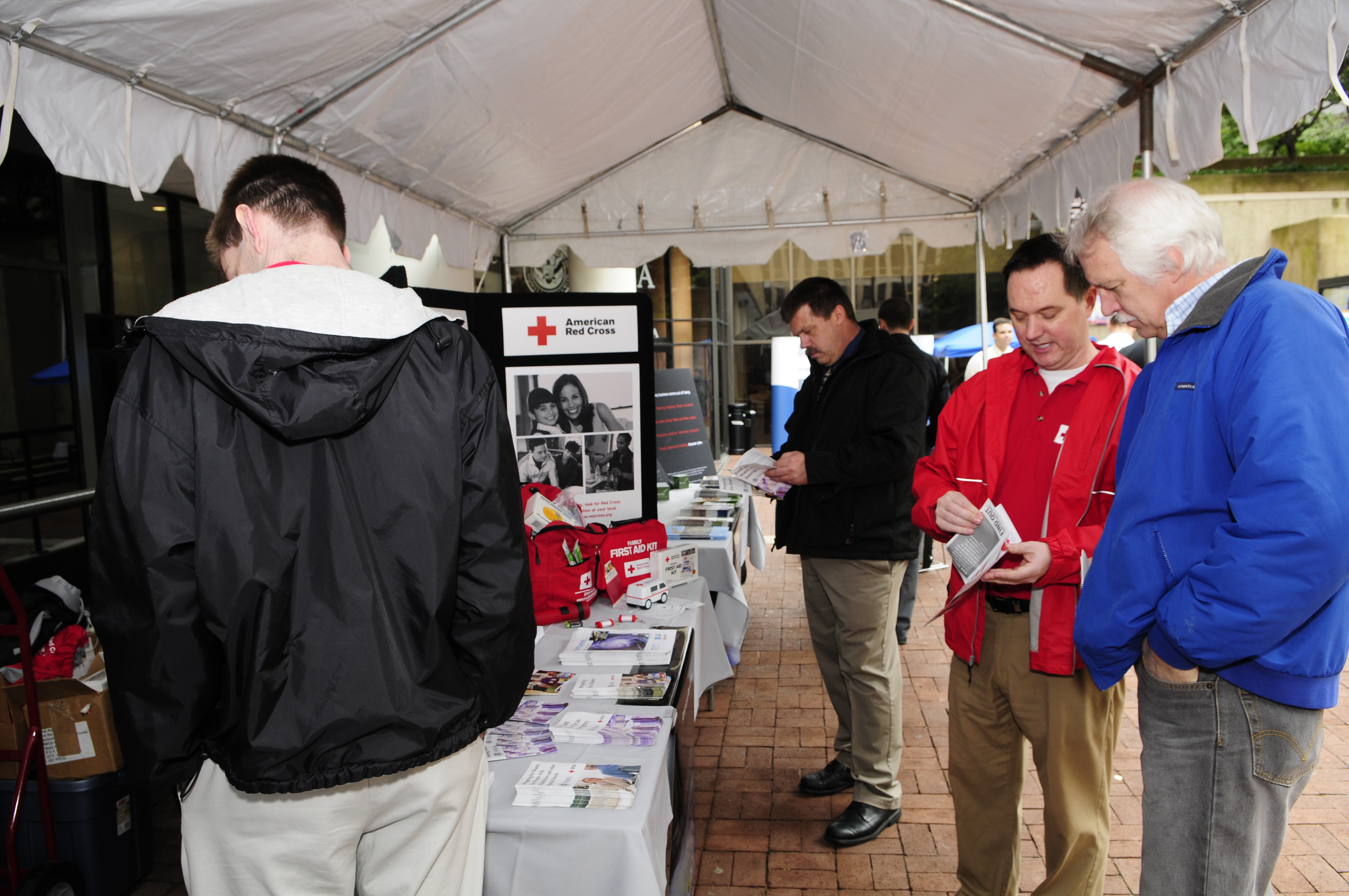
An American Red Cross volunteer explains a program to people visiting their display during FEMA's Hurricane Awareness Day.

Groups like FEMA, the USDA, and the Salvation Army could not operate without help from volunteers and small nonprofit groups. Prominent contributors to local food disaster efforts include groups like Emergency Communities and the American Rainbow Rapid Response (ARRR). These organizations typically focus on supplying rural and lower income areas that do not receive priority from large food distribution groups during a crisis.

==== The American Red Cross ====
Another group that works out of the United States is the American Red Cross. The American Red Cross is part of the International Red Cross, and 95% of all workers within the American Red Cross are volunteers. In the case of all crises, whether food related or not, the American Red Cross in engaged in relieving disaster victims. The Red Cross coordinates with local communities to provide essentials such as food, water, and hot meals for those in need during a crisis.

==== Food distribution and food insecurity ====
Organizations that are founded to target food insecurity have relied on food distribution to serve people in need of regular nutritious foods. Food banks are the proper term to call these kind of organizations where they use "government sector, private sector, and civil society" to distribute and recover food that will ultimately go to waste. In the United States, there are many organizations all over the country that have the same similar goal however, there is not much effective collaboration between all organizations because it is challenging to coordinate efficient communication within one another. There is one large organization that focuses on distributing food to people who need it in the United States, Feeding America has over 200 food banks and 60,000 food pantries. There are more organizations that focus on distributing food that work independently and are not as big as Feeding America that contribute to distributing food to help with the issue of food insecurity.

== History ==
One clear and defined documentation of historical food distribution comes from the Roman Republic and Empire. Many Roman rulers and emperors sought to determine the best method of distributing food throughout the Mediterranean, and as the demands of the Roman people changed in time, so too did their leaders’ plans. In the few centuries after the death of Christ, the annona became a prominent aspect in Roman food distribution. As the Empire expanded and the accessibility to certain foods changed, the demand for grain and wine drastically increased, and became a defining aspect of Roman food culture.

Societies prominent after the fall of the Romans continued to deal with the ever-present dilemma of food distribution. The distribution systems of the United States and Latin America have developed in unique ways, and faced different problems in the past century. The United States' food distribution system is vast in size and strength, and is dominated by corporations and industry. Current methods of food distribution in the US rely on the country's advanced network of infrastructure and transportation. In less developed parts of the world like Latin America, food distribution differs from the US.

=== Rome ===
The traditional Roman diet consisted of grain, fruits, olive oil, meat and wine. Of all these, grain was extremely important to the Roman people. During Rome's height, it is estimated that the city itself needed 150,000 tons of grain and millions of liters of water and wine every year to survive. It was traditionally the responsibility of the Roman government to guarantee that there was enough food for distribution among the people. In times of shortages, bad harvests, or interference by pirates, the government made sure to fulfill its obligation to food distribution. Officials would sometimes buy food themselves and then sell it back to the people at little to no cost. When Rome eventually established its Empire, foreign lands would send taxes in grain to Rome, which helped decrease the chance of a food distribution crisis.

==== The Annona ====
The first indication of a collective, organized food distribution system within the Roman Republic comes from the annona. Originally meaning "yearly return", the annona became the administrative term for governmental bread and grain distribution. Over time, annona came to represent the distribution of all pertinent foods in the Roman diet. The annona was originally organized between 500 and 50 BCE, and gained increasing influence in the centuries to come. The practice of specifically distributing grain to the plebeian class, known as frumentationes, gained prominence around 120 BCE and supplemented the efforts of the annona to feed the Roman people. Emperor Augustus officially changed the annona system between 8 and 14 CE. He established the position of praefectus annonae, Prefect of the Annona. Up to this point in time, the annona was handled by local government officials called aediles. Augustus’ Prefect of the Annona oversaw all transportation, weighing, inspection, and storing of state foods.

The physical distribution of foods throughout the Roman Empire varied by location and type of food. Some foods were shipped by boat and then distributed once they reached port. Others, specifically meat, were transported by land and brought into urban areas. Special regulations were put in place for the distribution of olive oil, as the Empire made contracts with olive oil producers all over the Mediterranean. Free daily distributions of olive oil were enacted by Emperor Severus during his reign from 192 to 211 CE. His distribution policy lasted for at least a few centuries, but scholars are unsure if the policy continued thereafter. Wine was not as freely distributed as olive oil, but was sold for a very low price starting around 300 CE.

=== Food distribution in the 20th and 21st centuries ===
==== US food distribution from 1900 to 1960 ====
The United States' food distribution system has experienced major changes in the past hundred years. Food distribution primarily relied on small, local farms in the 1940s, but quickly grew to become a large business in the 1960s. Three economic advances that allowed for the growth in food distribution between 1910 and 1960 were the establishment of chain stores, retail cooperatives, and supermarkets.

===== Chain stores =====
Chain stores did not become popular in the United States until the end of World War I. It was reported in 1929 that chain stores accounted for 39% of all grocery sales in the United States. Chain stores' success is related to their ability to undersell smaller distributors. An anti-chain movement arose in response to the success of the chain stores during the Great Depression, but caused little detriment to the success and profitability of the chains.

===== Retail cooperatives =====
Another response to the success of the chain stores was the development of retail cooperatives. These organizations were founded by groups of individual food distributors who saw the benefits of using chain-style pricing. Retail cooperatives accounted for 7% to 8% of the food market in 1930, and an increase in their popularity with independent food distributors rose retail cooperative's market share to 13% by 1958.

===== Supermarkets =====
The third and final change to US food distribution in the first half of the 20th century involved the establishment of supermarkets. The Ford Motor Company performed the first experiment regarding the profitability of large-scale supermarkets after the end of World War I. Supermarkets officially began gaining prominence in the 1930s and steadily continued their growth into the post-WWII era.

== See also ==
- Overpopulation
- Cold chain
- Food security
- Logistics
- Retail concentration
- Right to food
- Agricultural marketing
