= Verret, Louisiana =

Verret Verrett, Verrettville
- Unincorporated community
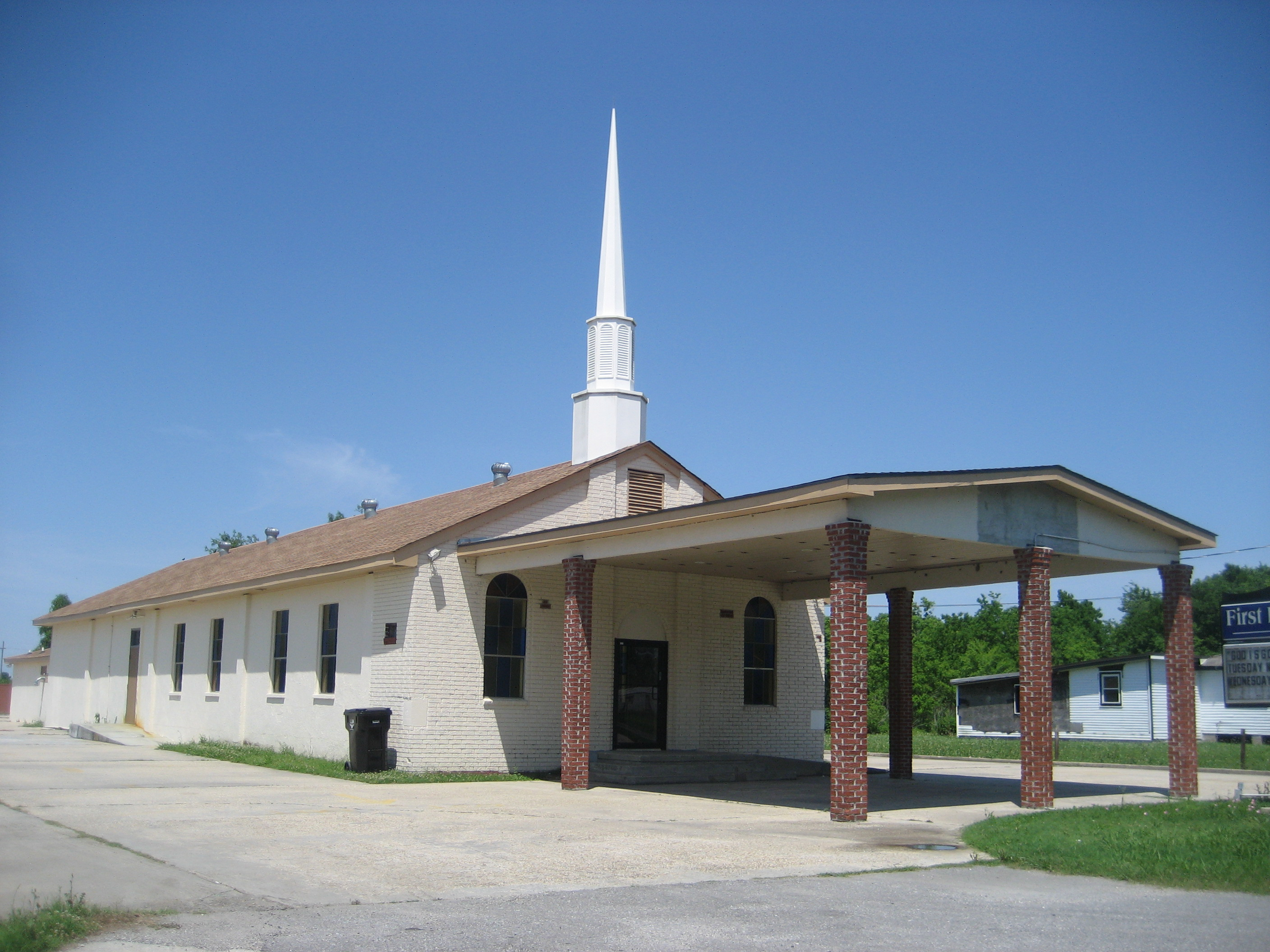
- First Baptist Church of Verrettville

- Location within Louisiana Location within the United States
- Coordinates: 29°51′43″N 89°46′47″W
- Country: United States
- State: Louisiana
- Parish: St. Bernard Parish
- MCD: District E
- Established: 1871
- Elevation: 3 ft (0.91 m)
- Time zone: UTC−6 (Central)
  - Summer (DST): UTC−5 (Central)
- ZIP code: 70085
- Area code: 504
- GNIS feature ID: 1628427

Verret (/ˈvɜːrɛt/), commonly known as Verrett or Verrettville, is an unincorporated community in St. Bernard Parish, Louisiana, United States. The community was originally established as a freedmen's town by formerly enslaved African Americans.

In 2018, a Louisiana state historical marker was placed at the First Baptist Church of Verrettville in recognition of its significance in addition to the importance of community founder Rev. Samuel Smith.
