= Great Mississippi Flood of 1927 =

1927 flood of the Mississippi River

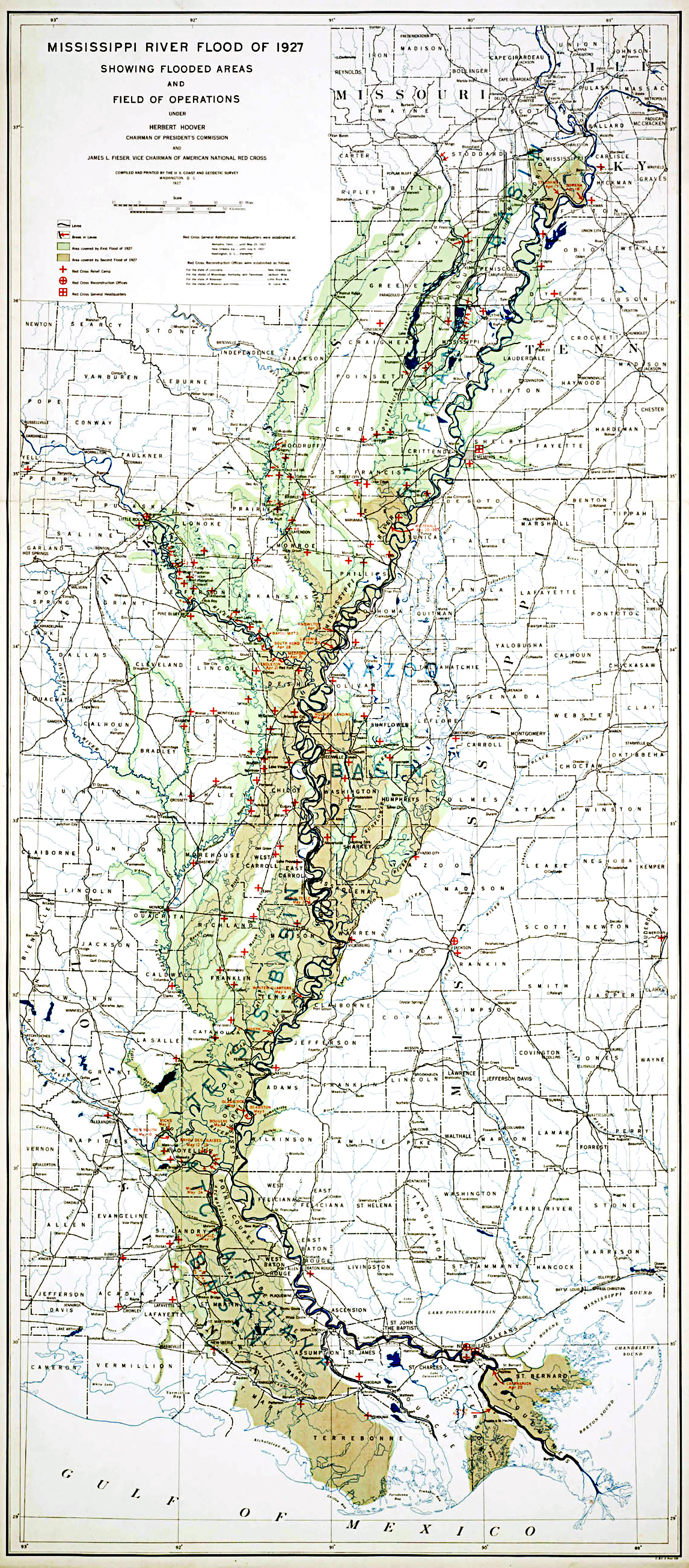
- Mississippi River Flood of 1927 showing flooded areas and relief operation

Meteorological history
- Duration: 1926–1929

Flood

Overall effects
- Fatalities: About 500
- Areas affected: Particularly Arkansas, Louisiana, and Mississippi – along with Missouri, Illinois, Kansas, Tennessee, Kentucky, Oklahoma, and Texas

The Great Mississippi Flood of 1927 was the most destructive river flood in the history of the United States, with 27,000 square miles (70,000 km^{2}) inundated in depths of up to 30 feet (9 m) over the course of several months in early 1927. The period cost of the damage has been estimated to be between $246 million and $1 billion, which ranges from $3.6–$14.5 billion in 2024 dollars.

About 500 people died and over 630,000 people were directly affected; 94% of those affected lived in Arkansas, Mississippi, and Louisiana, especially in the Mississippi Delta region. There were 127 deaths in Arkansas, making it one of the deadliest disasters ever recorded in the state. More than 200,000 African Americans were displaced from their homes along the Lower Mississippi River and had to live for lengthy periods in relief camps. As a result of this disruption, many joined the Great Migration from the South to the industrial cities of the North and the Midwest; Black Americans preferred to move, rather than return to rural agricultural labor.

To prevent future floods, the federal government built the world's longest system of levees and flood-ways. Then-secretary of commerce Herbert Hoover's handling of the crisis gave him a positive nationwide reputation, helping pave the way to his election as U.S. president in 1928. Political turmoil from the disaster at the state level aided the election of Huey Long as governor in Louisiana.

== Events ==
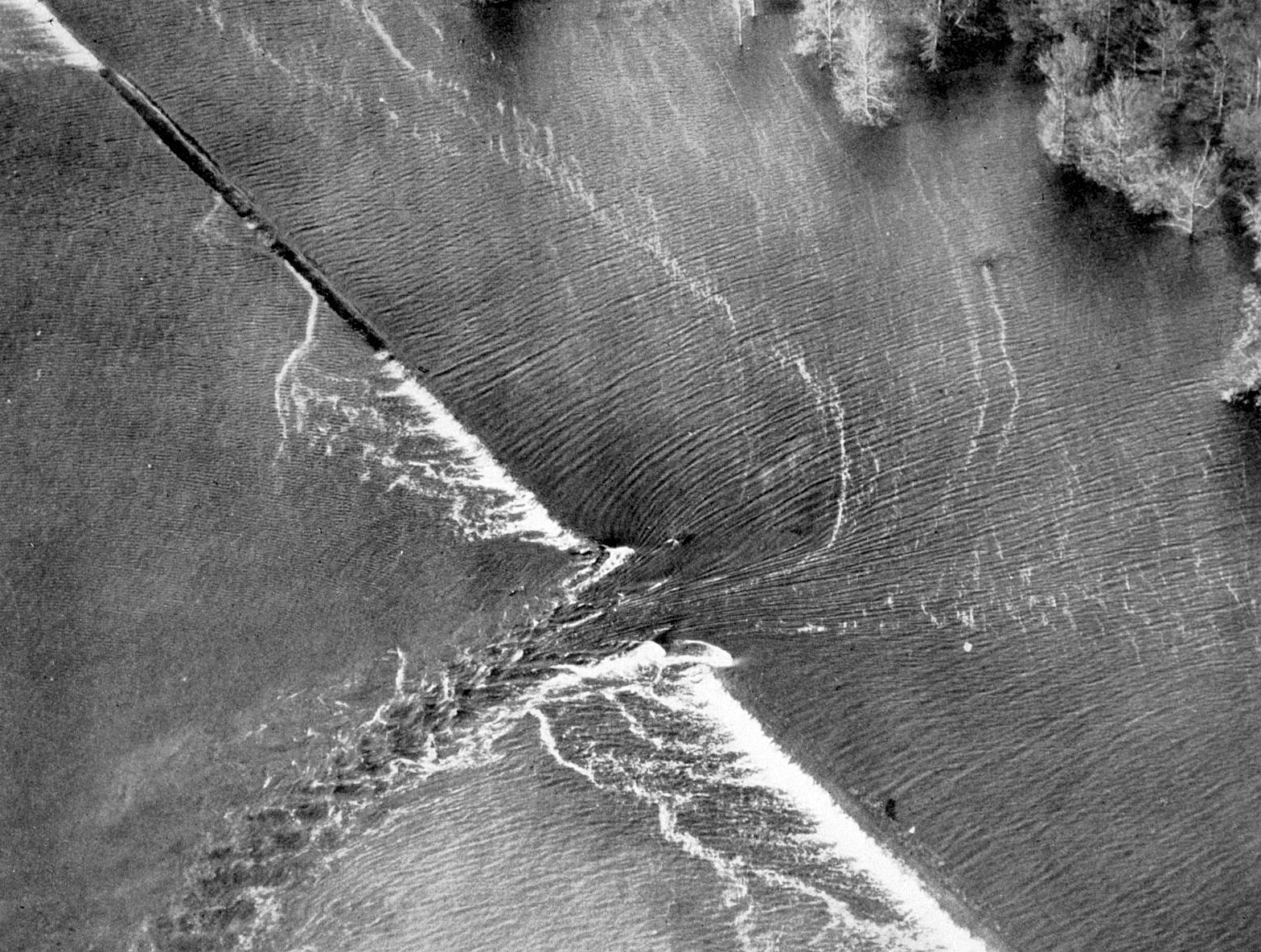
An aerial view of one of the levee breaches (Mound Landing, Mississippi, breached 21 April)

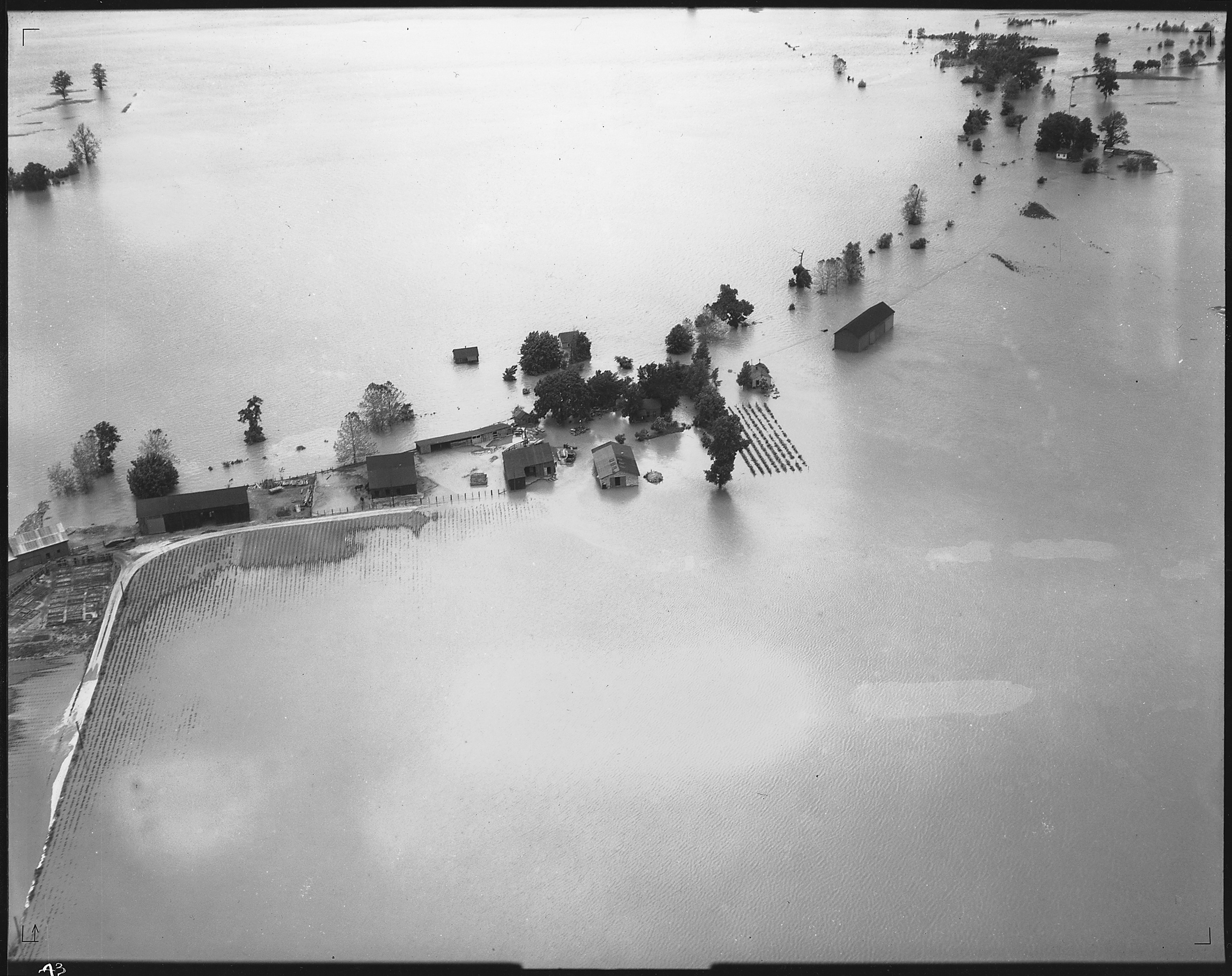
Submerged farmland

By the late nineteenth century, the United States was well aware of flooding potential along the Mississippi, which drained 40% of the nation's area. The Mississippi River Commission was established by the federal government in 1879, with the directive to deepen the river channel, improve navigation, prevent major flooding, and increase river-based commerce. This commission recommended raising extensive levees along its channels to contain the flow, dismissing the advice of experts such as James Eads, who had directed the Saint Louis Bridge project in the 1860s. These critics predicted that compressing a swollen river between walls would increase its destructive potential.

Flooding began due to heavy rainfall in summer 1926 across the river's central basin. By September, the Mississippi's tributaries in Kansas and Iowa were swollen to maximum capacity. On Christmas Day of 1926, the Cumberland River at Nashville, Tennessee, exceeded 56.2 ft (17.1 m), the second-highest recorded level (a destructive flood in 1793 had produced the record level – 58.5 ft (17.8 m)).

Flooding peaked in the Lower Mississippi River near Mound Landing, Mississippi, and Arkansas City, Arkansas, and broke levees along the river in at least 145 places. The water flooded more than 27,000 square miles (70,000 km^{2}) of land, and left more than 700,000 people homeless. Approximately 500 people died as a result of flooding. Monetary damages due to flooding reached approximately $1 billion, which was one-third of the federal budget in 1927. If the event were to have occurred in 2023, the damages would total around $1.38 trillion to $1.48 trillion.

The flood affected Missouri, Illinois, Kansas, Tennessee, Kentucky, Arkansas, Louisiana, Mississippi, Oklahoma, and Texas. Arkansas was hardest hit, with 14% of its territory covered by floodwaters extending from the Mississippi and Arkansas deltas. By May 1927, the Mississippi River below Memphis, Tennessee, reached a width of 80 miles (130 km). Without trees, grasses, deep roots, and wetlands, the denuded soil of the watershed could not do its ancient work of absorbing floodwater after seasons of intense precipitation.

== Attempts at relief ==
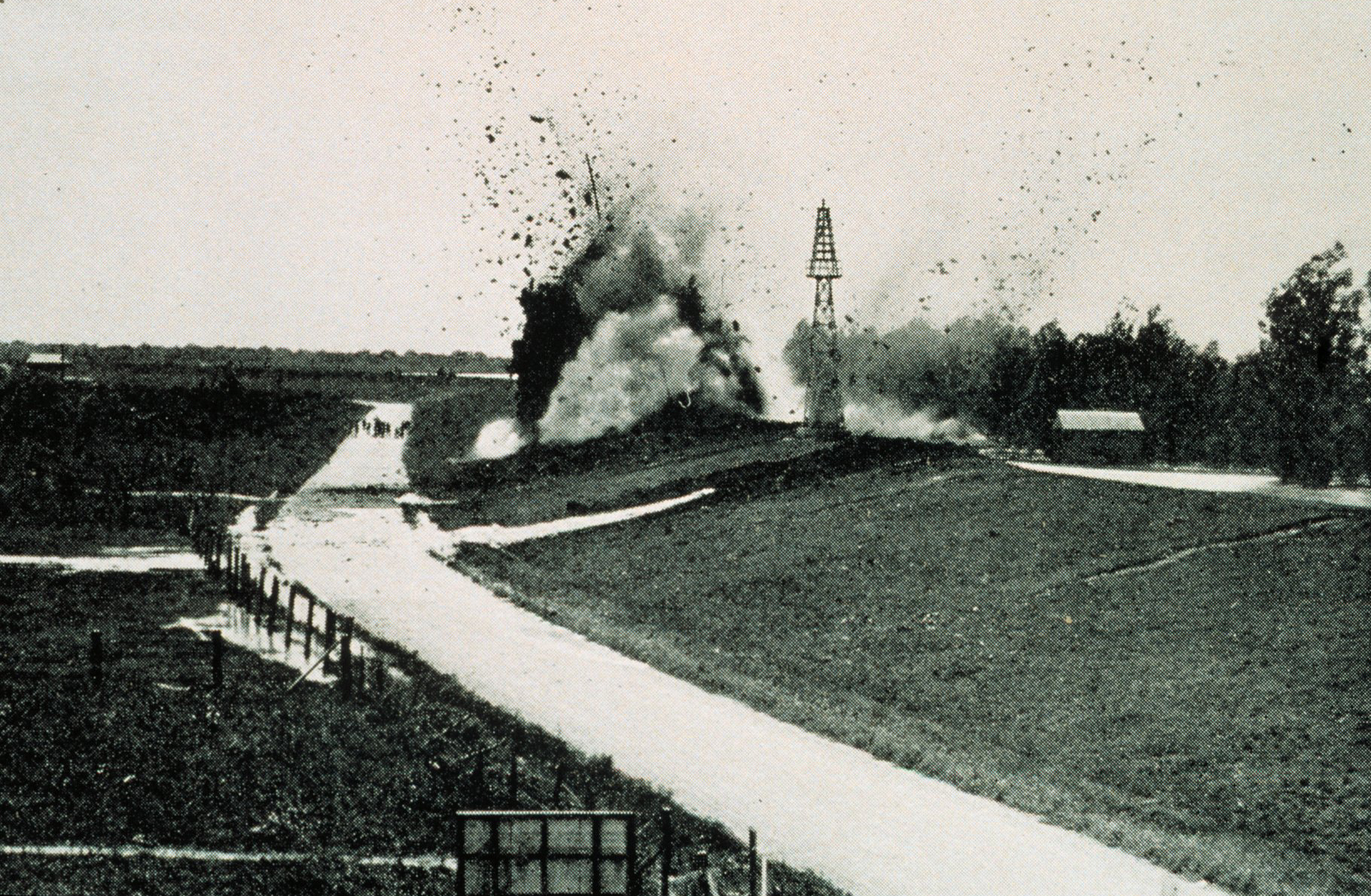
A river levee is blown up in Caernarvon, Louisiana (29 April)

In an unrelated flood at the same time, on Good Friday (15 April 1927), 15 inches (380 mm) of rain fell in New Orleans in 18 hours. This far exceeded the City's rainwater pumping system, and up to 4 feet (1.2 m) of water flooded some parts of the city. This local rain-related flood was not connected to the Mississippi River flooding.

A group of influential bankers in New Orleans met to discuss how to guarantee the safety of the city, as they had already learned of the massive scale of flooding upriver. On 29 April, they arranged to set off about 30 tons of dynamite on the levee at Caernarvon, Louisiana, releasing 250,000 cu ft/s (7,000 m^{3}/s) of water. This was intended to prevent New Orleans from suffering serious damage, and it resulted in flooding much of the less densely populated St. Bernard Parish and all of Plaquemines Parish's east bank. As it turned out, the destruction of the Caernarvon levee was unnecessary; several major levee breaks well upstream of New Orleans, including one the day after the demolitions, released major amounts of flood waters, reducing the water that reached the city. The New Orleans businessmen did not compensate the losses of people in the downriver parishes.

To address the disaster, Congress passed the Mississippi Flood Control Act, which put greater stress on construction in the Mississippi Delta levee camps despite warnings from the NAACP about harsh living conditions and mistreatment of black laborers within the camps.

== Abatement and assessment ==
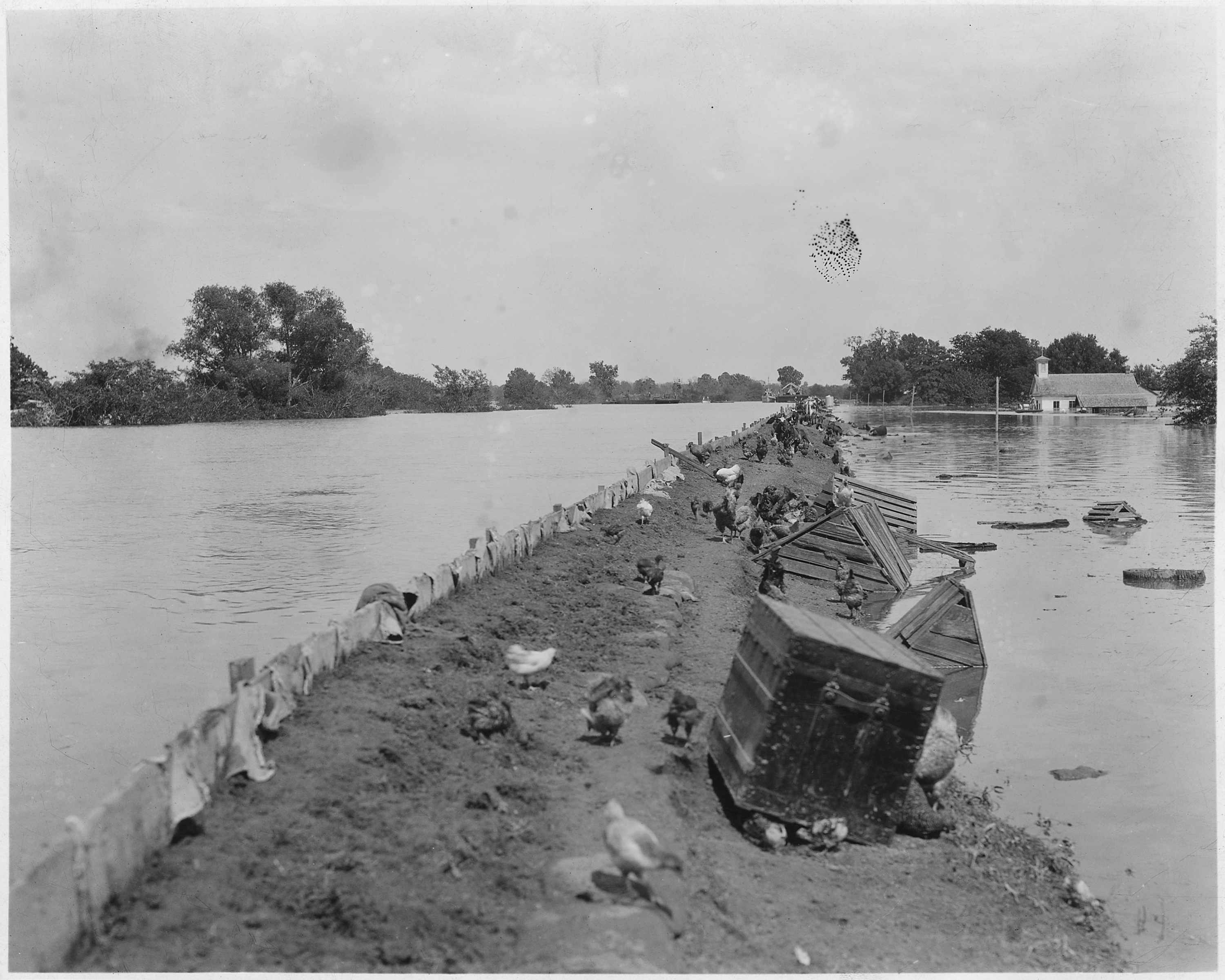
Poultry and livestock sit on a levee just above the water

By August 1927, the flood subsided. Hundreds of thousands of people had been made homeless and displaced; properties, livestock and crops were destroyed. In terms of population affected, in territory flooded, in property loss and crop destruction, the flood's figures were "staggering". Great loss of life was averted by relief efforts, largely by the American Red Cross through the efforts of local workers.

African Americans, comprising 75% of the population in the Delta lowlands and supplying 95% of the agricultural labor force, were most affected by the flood. Historians estimate that 94% of the 637,000 people forced to relocate by the flooding lived in three states: Arkansas, Mississippi and Louisiana; and that 69% of the 325,146 who occupied the relief camps were African American. In one location, over 13,000 evacuees near Greenville, Mississippi, were gathered from area farms, and evacuated to the crest of the unbroken Greenville Levee. But many were stranded there for days without food or clean water.

== Political and social responses ==
Following the Great Flood of 1927, multiple states needed money to rebuild their roads and bridges. Louisiana received $1,067,336 from the federal government for rebuilding, but it had to institute a state gasoline tax to create a $30,000,000 fund to pay for new hard-surfaced highways.

The Corps of Engineers was charged with taming the Mississippi River. Under the Flood Control Act of 1928, the world's longest system of levees was built. Floodways that diverted excessive flow from the Mississippi River were constructed. While the levees prevented some flooding, scientists have found that they changed the flow of the Mississippi River, with the unintended consequence of increasing flooding in succeeding decades. Channeling of waters has reduced the absorption of seasonal rains by the floodplains, increasing the speed of the current and preventing the deposit of new soils along the way. The levees did not prevent recurrences of significant flooding, especially a major flood in 1937. To better study and plan for future situations, Lt. Eugene Raybold proposed laying out a physical hydraulic model to simulate the basin's response to various rainfall scenarios. Land was procured at the SE edge of Clinton, Mississippi, and a 200-acre hydraulic model was constructed, matching to the river's flow from Baton Rouge to Omaha, modeling the confluence points of its major tributaries across 16 states. The work was completed during 1942, with some labor provided by POWs from Camp Clinton. The Corps used this model to accurately study river flows and mitigation strategies, but by 1970 it fell out of use. In the 1970s it was transferred to the city government of Jackson, and the Buddy Butts Park was created around it. It is presently little-known or recognized.

The devastation of the flood and the strained racial relations resulted in many African Americans joining the Great Migration from affected areas to northern and midwestern cities, a movement that had been underway since World War I. The flood waters began to recede in June 1927, but interracial relations continued to be strained. Hostilities had erupted between the races; a black man was shot and killed by a white police officer when he refused to unload a relief boat at gunpoint. Near Helena, Arkansas, Owen Flemming was lynched after he killed a plantation overseer, who wanted to force him to rescue the plantation owner's mules. As a result of displacements lasting up to six months, tens of thousands of local African Americans moved to the big cities of the North, particularly Chicago; many thousands more followed in the following decades.

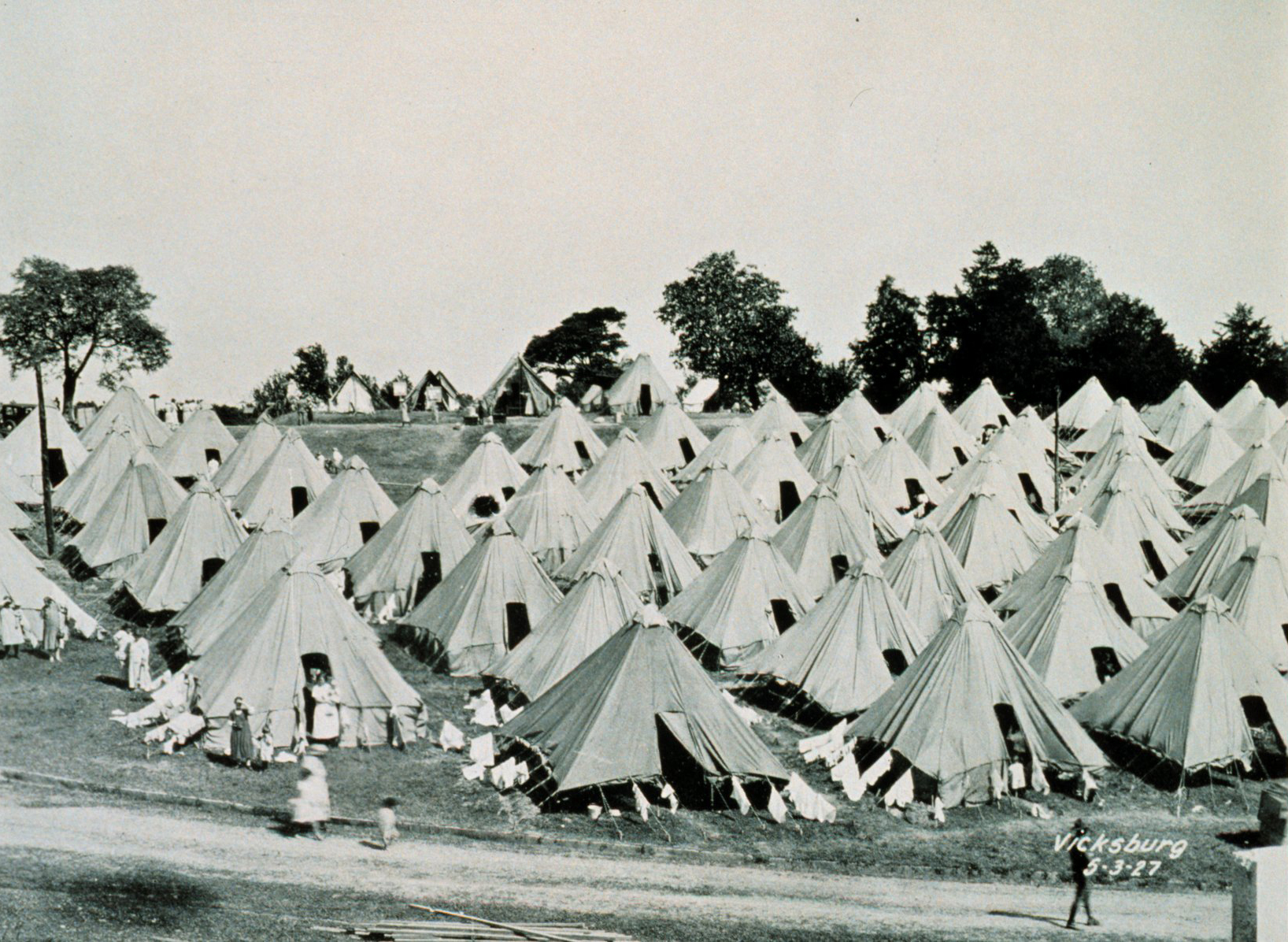
A tent-city for displaced citizens in Vicksburg, Mississippi

Herbert Hoover enhanced his reputation by his achievements in directing flood relief operations as Secretary of Commerce under President Calvin Coolidge. The next year Hoover easily won the Republican 1928 nomination for President, and the general election that year. In upstate Louisiana, anger among yeomen farmers directed at the New Orleans elite for its damage of downriver parishes aided Huey Long's election to the governorship in 1928. Hoover was much lauded initially for his masterful handling of the refugee camps known as "tent cities". These densely populated camps required basic necessities which were difficult to attain, such as water and sanitation facilities. Hoover used a combination of bureaucratic resources and grassroots forces to give the tent cities the opportunity to become self-sufficient. This method presented difficulties, as rural leaders were unprepared to manage the chaotic circumstances found in large camps. This led Hoover eventually to place the relief camps under government supervision.

The refugee camps also dealt with extreme racial inequality, as supplies and means of evacuation after flooding were given strictly to white citizens, with blacks receiving only leftovers. African Americans also did not receive supplies without providing the name of their white employer or voucher from a white person. In order to fully exploit black labor, blacks were frequently forced to work against their will, and were not permitted to leave the camps. Later reports about the poor treatment in camps led Hoover to make promises of change to the African-American community, which he broke. As a result, he lost the black vote in the North in his re-election campaign in 1932. (Note: In the South, African Americans were still overwhelmingly disenfranchised by state constitutions and practices, as they remained until after passage of the Voting Rights Act of 1965.) Several reports on the terrible situation in the refugee camps, including one by the Colored Advisory Commission headed by Robert Russa Moton, were kept out of the media at Hoover's request, with the pledge of further reforms for blacks after the presidential election in 1928. His failure to deliver followed other disappointments by the Republican Party; Moton and other influential African Americans began to encourage black Americans to align instead with the national Democrats.

== Representation in other media ==
- A feature-length documentary, The Great Flood (2014) was made incorporating archival footage from news coverage of the flood.
- The flood is referred to as the "High Water of 1927" in the movie The Autobiography of Miss Jane Pittman.
- The flood forms the setting for William Faulkner's novella "Old Man" (short for 'Old Man River') found in his book If I Forget Thee, Jerusalem (formerly titled The Wild Palms), ISBN 9780679741930.
- The great flood is described in detail in William Alexander Percy's Lanterns on the Levee: Recollections of a Planter's Son (1941), Alfred A. Knopf, ISBN 0-8071-0072-2 (Reprinted with new introduction by Walker Percy, Louisiana State University Press, 1973), which discussed the changing South of Percy's youth and portrayed life in the Mississippi Delta. Percy bridged the interval between the semi-feudal South of the 1800s and the anxious South of the early 1940s.
- The flood plays a significant role in the novel, Rescued in the Clouds or Ted Scott, Hero of the Air (1927), the second book in the Ted Scott Flying Stories series by Franklin W. Dixon.
- The Tilted World a novel by Beth Ann Fennelly and Tom Franklin is set during the Great Mississippi Flood of 1927, (2014), ISBN 978-0062069191
- Rising Tide: The Great Mississippi Flood of 1927 and How It Changed America by John M. Barry, (1998), ISBN 978-0684840024
- Father Mississippi: The Story of the Great Flood of 1927 by Lyle Saxon, (1999), ISBN 978-1565547957
- Several musicians mentioned the 1927 flood in their music:
  - "Mississippi Heavy Water Blues", by Barbecue Bob (1927)
  - "Backwater Blues" by Bessie Smith (1927) However, the flood was at its worst some two months after the song was written. Study of Smith's touring itinerary, of testimony of fellow entertainers who toured with her, and of contemporary reports indicates that the song was written in response to the flood that struck Nashville, Tennessee, on Christmas Day 1926. The Cumberland River, which flows through the city, rose 56 feet (17 m) above its normal level, still a record as of 2014.
  - "When the Levee Breaks", by Memphis Minnie and Kansas Joe McCoy (1929) (reinterpreted by Led Zeppelin in 1971).
  - "The Mississippi Flood" was recorded by Vernon Dalhart in May 1927.
  - "The Mississippi Blues" was recorded by Laura Smith in 1927, along with "Lonesome Refugee" the same year.
  - "The Flood Blues" was recorded by Sippie Wallace in 1927.
  - "The 1927 Flood" was recorded by the Elders McIntorsh & Edwards' Sanctified Singers in 1927.
  - "High Water Everywhere", by Charley Patton (1929) (referred to in "High Water (For Charley Patton)" by Bob Dylan in 2001)
  - "Louisiana 1927" by Randy Newman (1974)
  - The Delta Flood Prophet by Frank Cademartori (2020)

== See also ==
- 1927 in the environment
- 2011 Mississippi River floods
- Effects of Hurricane Katrina in New Orleans
- Great Flood of 1913
- Great Flood of 1993
- Mississippi River floods
- Timeline of environmental history
