= Community Center of St Bernard =

The Community Center of St Bernard (CCSTB) is a 501(c)(3) nonprofit organization located in Arabi, Louisiana, in St Bernard Parish near New Orleans. The Community Center was founded in 2006 to serve local residents after the overwhelming devastation caused by Hurricane Katrina and Hurricane Rita. The center was closed briefly during Hurricane Gustav, but was able to reopen almost immediately after the storm. The purpose of the Community Center is to assist local residents in their return to their homes, and to help normalize life.

== History ==
The Community Center was founded in 2006 to serve local residents of St. Bernard Parish after the devastation caused by Hurricane Katrina and Hurricane Rita. In St Bernard Parish, the epicenter of devastation, fully 93% of homes were rated as "severely damaged" or "destroyed". This is the only Parish in the history of America to have been completely inundated by flood waters. In many cases homes and businesses were covered up to the rooftops. One hundred and sixty four people in the Parish drowned. It is also the home to the largest residential domestic oil spill in US history, when the Murphy Oil Spill (Chalmette, Louisiana) released 1,050,000 gallons of crude oil.

== Activities ==
The center is dedicated to providing a wide range of necessary community services, including free food, clothes, hot meals, internet access, free long distance and local phones, computer classes, and community events such as after school programs and workshops. The Community Center also partners with local agencies and gives them space to provide their services at the center. This program is called the Community Connections Model and effectively turns the Community Center into a one stop shop for recovery resources in Greater New Orleans Area. Some partner agencies include Staff from the Louisiana Department of Social Services, Office of Family Support, Road Home, Senior Community Service Employment Program, Families Helping Families, Red Cross, St Anna’s Medical Mission, Mom & Baby Mobile Health Center, Daughters of Charity, and Swan River Yoga. The center also hosts a variety of workshops, dances and holiday celebrations that are free to the public.
