= National Civilian Community Corps =

American community service program

Agency overview
- Formed: October 1, 1993
- Jurisdiction: Federal government of the United States
- Headquarters: Washington, D.C.
- Agency executive: Ken Goodson, National Director
- Parent agency: AmeriCorps
- Website: https://www.americorps.gov/serve/americorps/americorps-nccc

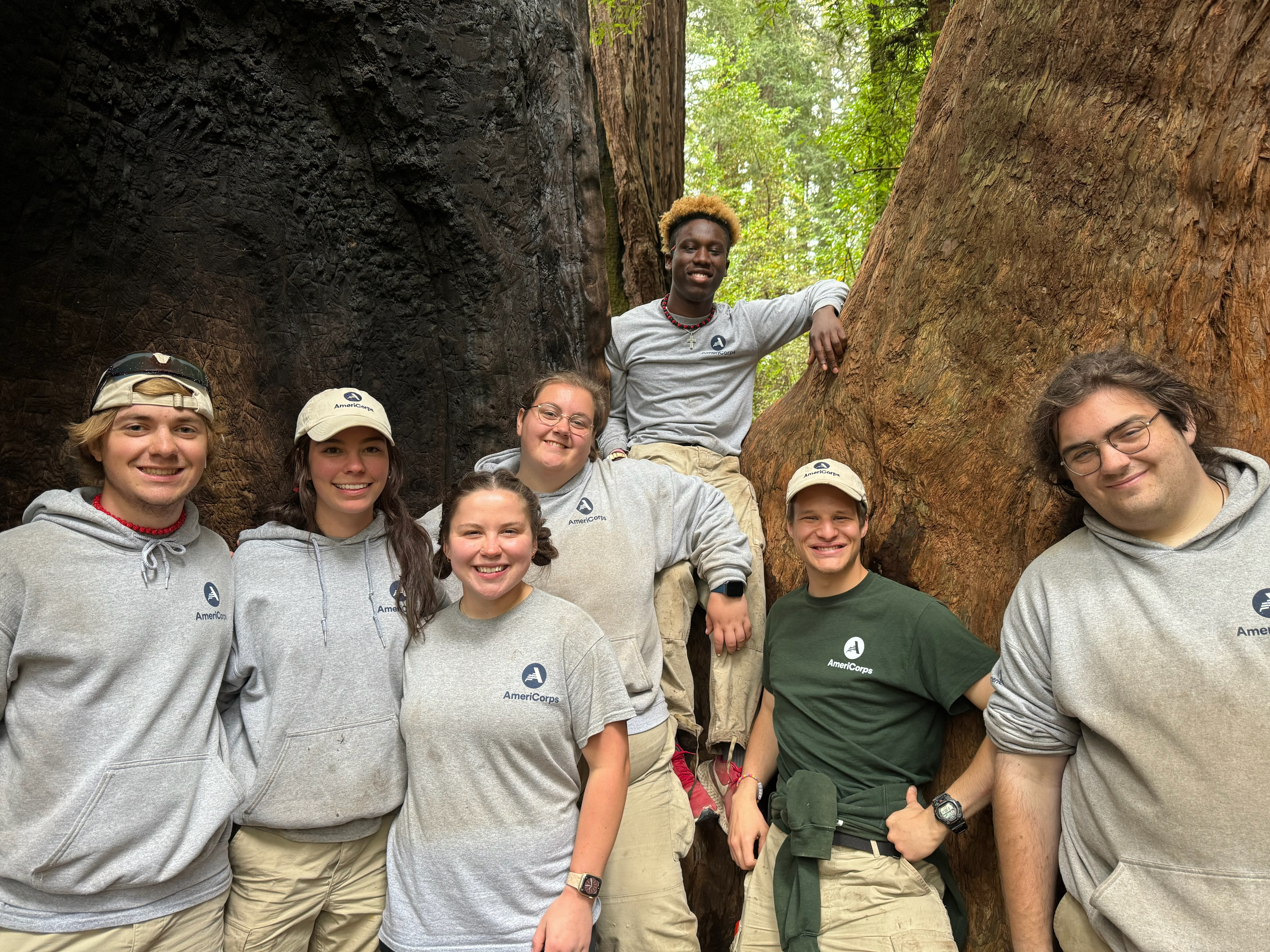
An AmeriCorps NCCC team on deployment in 2024 at Henry Cowell Redwoods State Park in California.

The National Civilian Community Corps (NCCC), or AmeriCorps NCCC (Note: NCCC is usually pronounced "N-triple-C”.), is an AmeriCorps program that engages young adults ages 18 to 24 in short-term community service projects across the United States. Founded in 1993, the mission of AmeriCorps NCCC is "to strengthen communities and develop leaders through direct, team-based national and community service."

Each year, approximately 2,200 NCCC members complete over 1.2 million hours of service across hundreds of projects in the areas of disaster response, infrastructure improvement, environmental conservation, energy conservation, and urban and rural development.

== History ==
=== Inception ===
The National Civilian Community Corps is loosely based on the Civilian Conservation Corps (CCC), a New Deal-era work relief program founded by President Franklin D. Roosevelt to employ young men left jobless by the Great Depression. Run by officers of the United States Army Reserve, the CCC employed three million men aged 18 to 26 across tens of thousands of projects related to environmental conservation and natural resource development. By the time the program was discontinued in 1942, CCC members had planted more than 3 billion trees, built nearly 100,000 miles of fire roads, and erected drainage systems for over 80 million acres of agricultural land.

In the early 1990s, the end of the Cold War sparked renewed interest in volunteerism and in the idea of using surplus military resources to solve domestic problems. In 1992, a bipartisan group of senators including John McCain, Harris Wofford, Bob Dole, and Barbara Mikulski inserted provisions into the National Defense Authorization Act of 1993 authorizing the creation of a “Civilian Community Corps Demonstration Program” to test the viability of resurrecting the CCC model as a response to contemporary problems.

The following year, President Bill Clinton signed legislation creating the Corporation for National and Community Service (also known as AmeriCorps), a federal agency dedicated to bringing Americans into national service; the new agency absorbed the nascent Corps as well as other existing programs such as VISTA.

=== Early Development ===
The first class of 850 NCCC members was sworn in by President Clinton at a White House ceremony on September 13, 1994. Like its New Deal-era forerunner, the new program was closely linked to the military: it was administered by a staff of officers recommended by the Secretary of Defense, and Corps units were trained and housed at campuses owned by the Department of Defense.

Between 1994 and 1999, more than 20,000 individuals applied to serve with NCCC, but only 6,000 were accepted due to budget constraints. Over the course of a typical program year, NCCC teams would complete between 300 and 400 projects focused on “environmental activities, education, human needs, and disaster response.” A majority of projects would be sponsored by nonprofit organizations, roughly a quarter by federal, state, and local government entities, and the rest by educational organizations and other institutions fitting the NCCC mandate. Frequent sponsoring organizations included Habitat for Humanity, Boys & Girls Clubs of America, YMCA, and The Nature Conservancy.

Disaster response soon became an important area of focus for NCCC. In its first five years, the Corps developed strong relationships with FEMA, the American Red Cross, and the U.S. Forest Service. By 1999, roughly 11% of NCCC projects saw teams working with these organizations to respond to hurricanes, forest fires, and other natural disasters. In 2005, after Hurricane Katrina devastated the Gulf Coast, 80% of NCCC teams across all five regions were pulled from their projects to aid in the response. Over the following four years, more than 4,000 NCCC members would serve on relief and recovery projects throughout the impacted region. Between 2012 and 2019, half of all NCCC projects involved disaster services.

=== AmeriCorps NCCC Expands Program Options ===
==== FEMA Corps ====
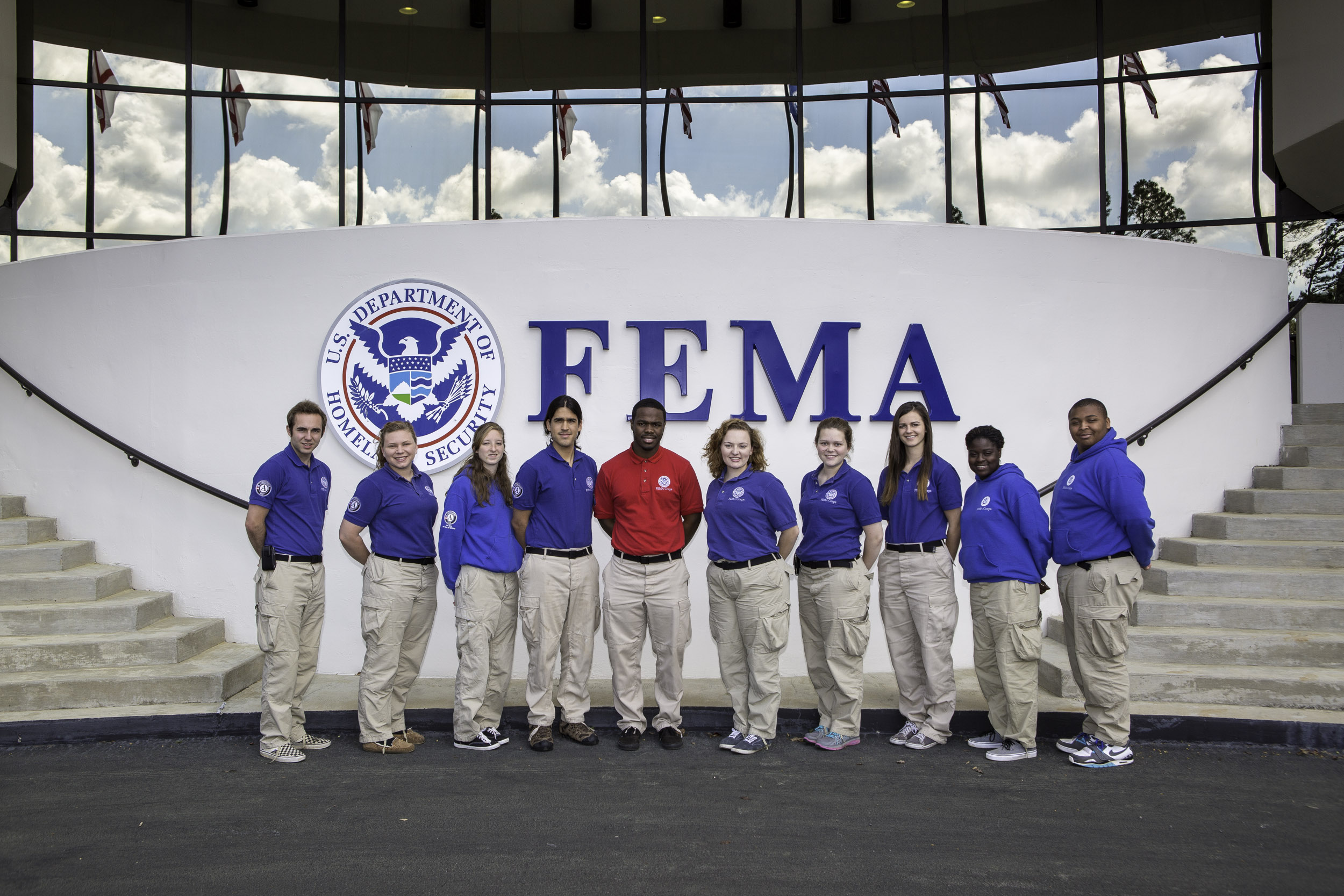
Example of an AmeriCorps NCCC FEMA Corps Team

In 2012, NCCC launched an official partnership with the Federal Emergency Management Agency that led to the creation of FEMA Corps, which adapts the NCCC model to concentrate exclusively on disaster relief efforts. FEMA Corps members “are dedicated to FEMA deployments in areas of logistics, disaster survivor assistance, individual and public assistance, and recovery.” In 2022, the partnership was formally extended for another five years.

==== Forest Corps ====
In 2023, NCCC struck an arrangement with the U.S. Forest Service to create the NCCC Forest Corps, which trains teams to assist the Forest Service in conducting conservation projects such as fuels reduction, trail maintenance, prescribed burns, and wildlife surveys. The first Forest Corps class was inducted in July 2024.

==== Summer of Service ====
By 2007, AmeriCorps NCCC was authorized to host a Summer of Service (SOS) program. The SOS program recruited students between ages 14 and 17 to complete service projects during summer vacation. The Summer of Service program was not offered every year however.

Following the expansion of the CARES act in 2020, AmeriCorps NCCC was able to offer the Summer of Service Program to adults aged 18–26. A SOS program for adults aged 18–26 operated was offered from 2023-2025. With the expiration of the CARES act in 2026, it's unclear if AmeriCorps NCCC will offer Summer of Service again.

==== Traditional Corps ====
The original AmeriCorps NCCC program model in which teams serve with a variety of non-profit organizations, state agencies, parks, and tribal organizations is referred to as "Traditional Corps."

=== Region Campuses ===
The original five campuses were located in San Diego, California; Charleston, South Carolina; Denver, Colorado; Perry Point, Maryland; and Washington, D.C. Each campus served as headquarters for a region covering multiple states.

In 2007, the Charleston campus closed down and responsibility for the region was divided among other campuses. A new campus opened in Vinton, Iowa the following year, by which point the Washington, D.C. campus had also closed down and the San Diego campus had relocated to Sacramento.

In 2009, the newest NCCC campus was opened in Vicksburg, Mississippi. The Perry Point campus relocated to Baltimore in 2014 before closing down four years later.

Currently, AmeriCorps NCCC is divided into four regions, each covering multiple states and territories: North Central, Pacific, Southern, and Southwest.

=== Program Funding and Interruptions ===
Legislators proposed shutting down AmeriCorps or the NCCC program entirely several times, most notably in 2006, 2017, and 2025.

In 2009, the Edward M. Kennedy Serve America Act expanded the number of members that could serve in AmeriCorps per year.

AmeriCorps NCCC members have been demobilized en masse at least twice. The first demobilization occurred in March 2020 due to COVID; all members were sent home and the term ended early. The second demobilization occurred in April 2025, when 85% of AmeriCorps staff were placed on leave. Over 700 NCCC members were sent home early and exited from the program; however in June 2025 a federal judge ordered AmeriCorps to restore the demobilized members to service.

== Program Structure ==
=== Overview ===
AmeriCorps NCCC recruits young adults to complete a term of service lasting either 10 or 11 months. There are four conditions that affect a member's service experience: their role, corps, term start date, and region.

==== Role ====
There are two roles in AmeriCorps NCCC: Corps Member and Team Leader. These two roles have different eligibility requirements, daily responsibilities, lengths of service, and living stipends.

Corps Members must be between the ages of 18-24 at the start of the program. A Corps Member's daily responsibilities include completing service projects with their team and participating in basic team chores such as cooking and cleaning. Corps Members serve for 10 months and receive a living stipend of about $430 per month.

Team Leaders must be at least 18 years old with no upper age limit. A Team Leader's daily responsibilities include completing service projects, managing their team of 8-11 Corps Members, acting as a liaison between the service project sponsor and NCCC staff, tracking the team budget, and reporting project accomplishments. Team Leaders serve for 11 months and receive a living stipend of about $1,100 per month.

==== Corps ====
There are three corps in AmeriCorps NCCC: FEMA Corps, Forest Corps, and Traditional Corps. This impacts the type of training and project work that a member completes.

FEMA Corps members receive training related to computer programs such as Excel and Emergency Management principles, and serve exclusively with the Federal Emergency Management Agency on projects related to disaster preparedness, mitigation, relief, and long-term recovery.

Forest Corps Members receive Red Card certification and additional chainsaw training, and serve exclusively with the U.S. Forest Service on projects related to fuels reduction, trail maintenance, prescribed burns, and wildlife surveys.

Traditional Corps Members receive basic safety training and serve with a variety of nonprofit organizations, state governments, and tribal groups to complete projects such as trail building, home construction, disaster relief, youth programs, and tax assistance.

==== Term Start ====
There are three intake periods per year: Winter, Summer, and Fall. This impacts the time of year that a member serves. The Winter term typically runs from January to November. The Summer term typically runs from June to May of the following year. The Fall term typically runs from September to July of the following year.

==== Region ====
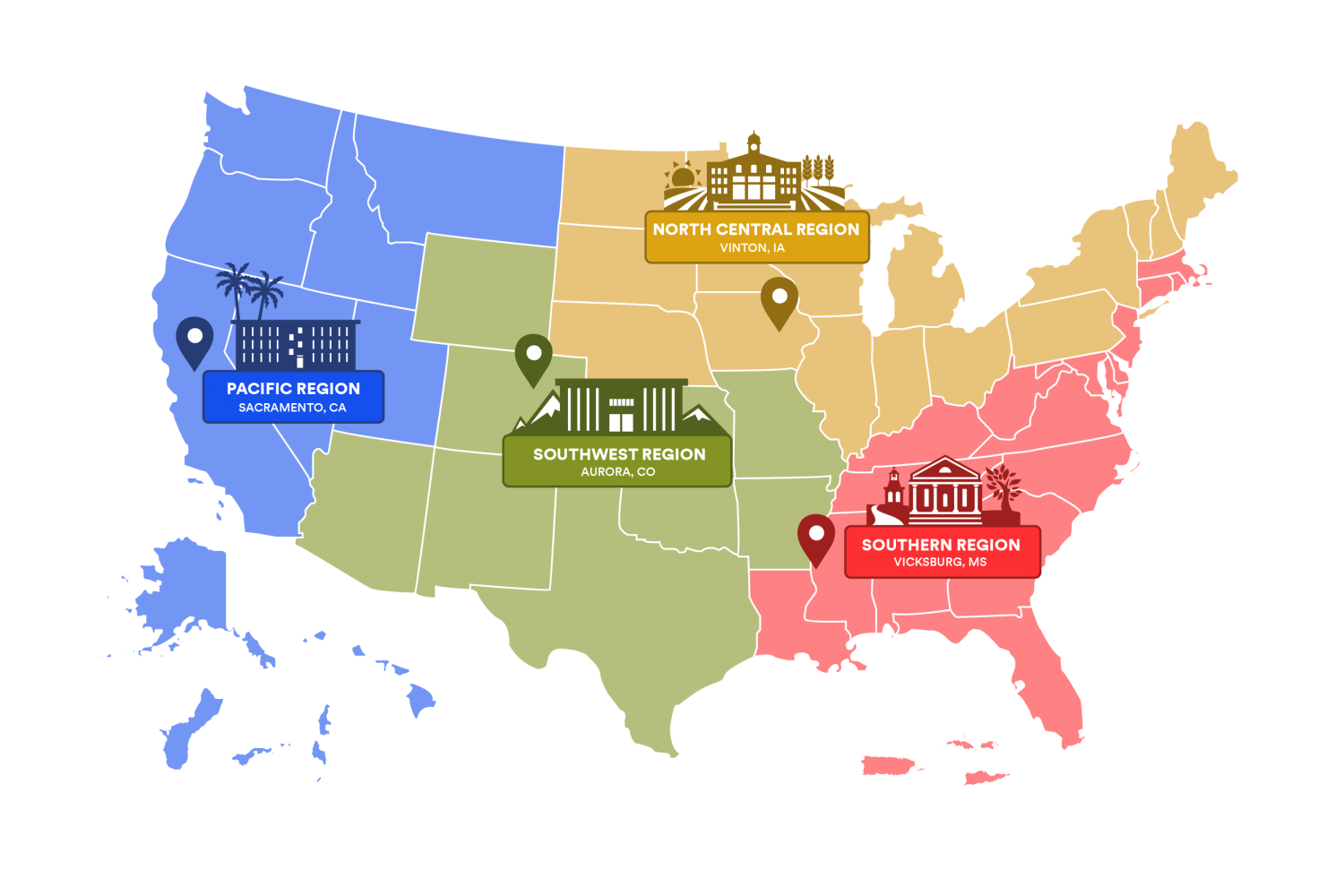
A map of the four regions of AmeriCorps NCCC: Pacific, Southwest, North Central, and Southern.

There are four region campuses that serve as training sites and operational bases for AmeriCorps NCCC. Each region is responsible for overseeing service projects in a different set of states and territories. As of 2025, the four region campuses are

- North Central Region located in Vinton, Iowa. The North Central region oversees service projects in the Midwest, Pennsylvania, New York, and northern New England.
- Pacific Region located in Sacramento, California. The Pacific Region oversees service projects in most of the Far West, Alaska, Hawaii, Guam, and American Samoa.
- Southern Region located in Vicksburg, Mississippi. The Southern Region oversees service projects in the Southeast as well as New Jersey, southern New England, Puerto Rico, and the U.S. Virgin Islands.
- Southwest Region located in Aurora, Colorado. The Southwest Region oversees service projects in the West South Central states as well as Arizona, Colorado, and Wyoming.

This impacts the locations in which a member serves during their term. For example, a member assigned to the Southwest Region would only complete service projects in the states overseen by that region.

=== Service Year Timeline ===
==== Corps Training Institute (CTI) ====
Once selected, members are assigned to a regional campus that serves as a training site and operational base. AmeriCorps NCCC coordinates and pays for members to travel from their current home to the regional campus at the start of the term. Upon arrival, members are placed on teams consisting of one Team Leader and 7 to 11 Corps Members. For the first 3–4 weeks of the program, members live on campus and learn about NCCC policies, program benefits, and relevant skills for their upcoming service projects. This period is called Corps Training Institute (CTI).

==== Project Rounds and Transitions ====
AmeriCorps NCCC divides the 10-month service term into three rounds. A round is a 7 to 14 week period during which teams complete service projects in the field. A team may complete anywhere between one and three different service projects during a single round.

Between each round is a week-long break called a Transition. During Transition week, teams return to their regional campus to exchange supplies, complete additional trainings, and report on their project accomplishments. Afterwards, teams depart for their next round of projects.

==== Graduation Week ====
At the end of the 10 month term, teams return to campus for Graduation Week. Teams return supplies, pack their bags, receive trainings related to professional development and career resources, and celebrate their accomplishments. On the last day, AmeriCorps NCCC coordinates and pays for members to return to their home.

A typical service term with AmeriCorps NCCC consists of CTI, Round 1, Transition 1, Round 2, Transition 2, Round 3, and Graduation week in that order.

=== Project Development and Selection ===
Each region selects projects round-by-round from a pool of applications submitted from within its geographical purview. Only nonprofits, faith-based organizations, schools, government entities, and public land trusts may be selected as project sponsors. Sponsors are required to provide teams with a work plan, on-site supervision, and lodging which includes showers and cooking facilities.

As of 2019, approximately half of all NCCC projects were primarily concerned with disaster response, one-quarter with urban and rural development, one-fifth with environmental conservation, and the rest with infrastructure improvement or energy conservation. It is common for the same sponsor to host multiple teams over the course of several years; a study of 5,004 projects between 2012 and 2019 identified only 1,439 unique project sponsors. Projects vary widely in scope and scale, and the work can encompass a broad array of tasks and responsibilities such as tutoring schoolchildren, clearing away invasive species, building affordable housing, and helping community members file their taxes.

=== Benefits and Requirements ===
In order to serve, all NCCC members must be citizens or lawful permanent residents. In order to graduate from the program, all members must complete 1,700 hours of community service over a ten-month period. Members are required to refrain from using federally illegal drugs such as marijuana and are subject to random drug tests throughout their service term.

While serving, AmeriCorps NCCC provides members with housing, transportation, a team food stipend, uniforms, limited health benefits, and a modest, taxable stipend for living expenses.

Members can resign from the program at any time. Those who successfully complete the program are eligible to receive a Segal AmeriCorps Education Award, which can be used to pay tuition costs at qualified institutions of higher education, for educational training, or to repay qualified student loans. The award amount is considered taxable income and is equal to the maximum value of the Pell Grant ($7,395 as of Fiscal Year 2023).

== Impact and criticism ==
A 2022 survey found that 87% of project sponsors believed “to a large or moderate extent” that NCCC teams strengthened the communities in which they served, while 89% believed that NCCC helped them accomplish their objectives in a shorter period of time. In 2009, then-Mississippi Governor Haley Barbour hailed NCCC’s response to Hurricane Katrina, saying that teams had rendered “tremendous service” to the Gulf Coast’s recovery efforts.

In 2026, the agency announced that NCCC volunteers have helped return nearly $250 million to 135,000 low-income individuals through no-cost tax preparation services since 2011.

However, NCCC has also come under substantial criticism, with many arguing that its costs are exorbitantly high relative to its impact. In 2006, President Bush’s proposal to eliminate NCCC drew support from some fiscal conservatives, with U.S. Representative Jerry Lewis calling the program “very costly and poorly administered” and libertarian activist James Bovard calling it a wasteful “boondoggle”. In 2016, AmeriCorps’s own Inspector General published a sharply critical assessment, finding that NCCC suffers from high attrition and low enrollment rates, and that its services “cost the taxpayers four to eight times more than the same services by…other AmeriCorps programs” yet “achieve no better long-term outcomes.” The report recommended that AmeriCorps divert funds away from NCCC and towards other programs like VISTA and Senior Corps, which it deemed more cost-effective. In response, NCCC leadership stated that because of NCCC’s residential nature, it is “[u]nlike any other national service program,” and that “direct comparisons to other national service programs are difficult and cannot adequately capture” the program’s value.

== List of National Directors ==
National Directors of NCCC
Name	Term
Brig. Gen. Donald L. Scott (Ret.)	1993 – 1996
Col. Fred L. Peters (Ret.)**	1996 – 1998
Lt. Gen. Andrew P. Chambers (Ret.)	1998 – 2000
Col. Fred L. Peters (Ret.)**	2000 – 2002
Wendy Zenker	2002 – 2003
Merlene Mazyck**	2003 – 2009
Mikel Herrington**	2009 – 2011
Kate Raftery	2011 – 2014
Gina Cross**	2014 – 2021
Jake Sgambati**	2021 – 2022
Ken Goodson	2022 – present

**Indicates that the individual initially assumed the National Directorship in an Acting capacity

== See also ==
- AmeriCorps
- Camp Hope
- Community service
- National service
- Service learning
- Volunteerism
- Youth service
