= New Waveland Cafe and Clinic =

Disaster response center in New Waveland

The medical clinic housed in a tent

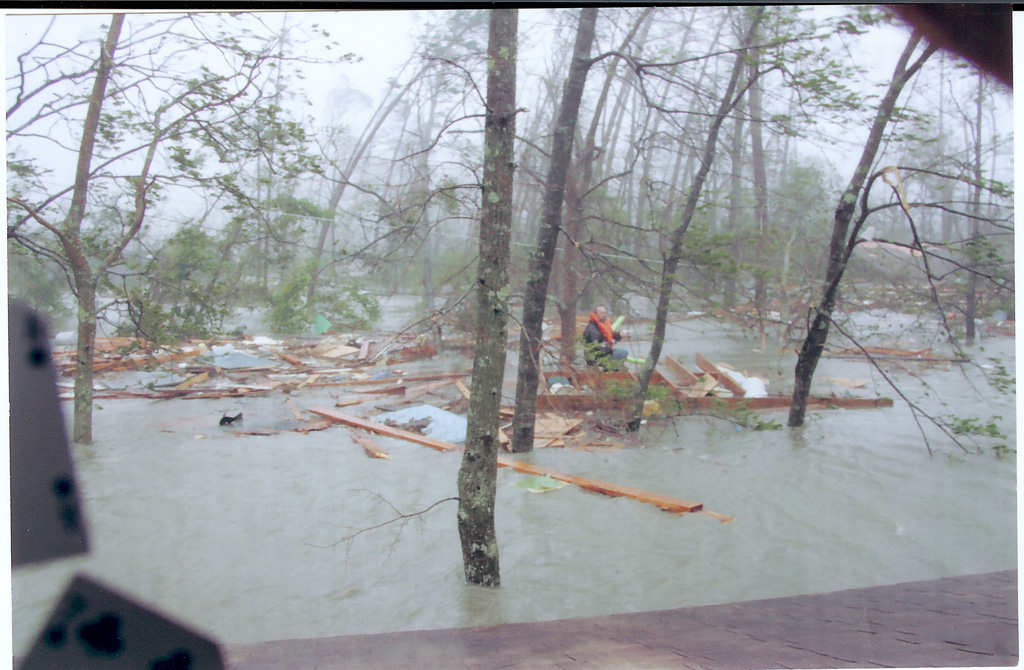
Waveland during Hurricane Katrina, August 2005

The New Waveland Café and New Waveland Clinic together formed a disaster response center consisting of a combination café, soup kitchen, medical clinic, donation center, and market, that operated free of charge from September 5 to December 1, 2005, in immediate Post-Katrina Mississippi Gulf Coast in Waveland, Mississippi, United States. The cafe and clinic were founded in response to Hurricane Katrina and provided free food and free medical care to hurricane victims for three months. They were located in tents in the parking lot of Fred's Department Store at 790 Hwy 90 in Waveland, across the street from the destroyed and gutted Waveland Police Department. The New Waveland Cafe served three free meals every day to thousands of residents and volunteers. The New Waveland Clinic provided free health care to over 5,500 patient contacts. As well, a group of hippies and Christians came together to form a unique group which worked together to provide emergency relief.

== Impact of Katrina ==
Hancock County is an ocean-side county situated in Southern Mississippi. As such, it has a long history of hurricanes. In 1969 the county was leveled by Hurricane Camille.

In 2000 the county had a population of 42,967. A vast majority of this population was exposed to the harsh effects of Hurricane Katrina. Hurricane Katrina made landfall on the US Gulf Coast on August 29, 2005, as a Category 3 hurricane. The town of Waveland was destroyed and has been described as "worst punishment Katrina could mete out". Official reports stated that approximately 50 people died when Waveland was hit directly by the eyewall of Katrina and the 32-foot (9.8 m) storm surge. Hurricane Katrina came ashore during the high tide of 8:01 am, +2.2 feet more. Hurricane Katrina damaged over 40 Mississippi libraries. The Waveland Public Library was a total loss requiring a complete rebuild.

== Cafe ==
The cafe originated when friends from the Rainbow Family began to communicate with each other about a possible response to the aftermath of Hurricane Katrina. The Rainbow Family are best known for the Rainbow Gathering, a large, primitive type camping event in which up to 20,000 people attend. Those who attend these gatherings have become skilled at making and serving food for extremely large groups of people for long periods of time and in very basic situations. The cafe operated free of charge and was supported solely by donations. The cafe served up to 4000 meals three times a day. The volunteers who built the cafe were Bastrop, TX church members and later operated by attendees of Rainbow Gatherings. As attendees of Rainbow Gatherings, the cafe volunteers often appeared to look like hippies. They were reported to have "piercings" and "dreadlocks".

== Clinic ==
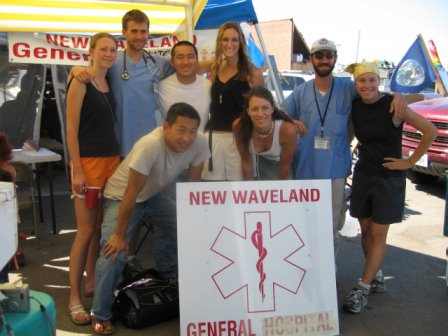
Stone (second from right) and some of the volunteer medical staff

The New Waveland Clinic was a temporary emergency clinic set up by Brad "Baruch" Stone on August 28, 2005, and housed in tents. Stone used his skills as an emergency medical technician (EMT) and previous experiences as a volunteer coordinator at the CALM Medical Clinic in order to build and administrate the clinic. The clinic recruited volunteer doctors, Physician Assistants, medical students, nurses, pharmacists, EMTs, and paramedics from different parts of the United States to volunteer for a week at a time. Medications and medical tools were donated by dozens of organizations including Pfizer, which donated the majority of the medications used. During its three months of operation, the clinic had over 5,500 documented patient encounters.

The clinic was equipped and staffed by physicians specializing in family medicine, internal medicine, pediatrics, and psychiatry. The clinic operated primarily as a walk-in clinic where patients could see a doctor for all complaints and receive free medication. Due to the lack of a functioning emergency room the clinic was sometimes utilized as a facility to stabilize a patient while an ambulance was en route to transport the patient to an emergency room. The closest hospitals were 42 miles (68 km) to the west at the Louisiana Heart Hospital in Lacombe, Louisiana or the Northshore Medical Center in Slidell, Louisiana, or 35 miles (56 km) to the east at the Gulfport Memorial Hospital in Gulfport, Mississippi. The local hospital, Hancock County Medical Center, was incapacitated due to the hurricane. There were no X-ray or blood laboratory available with the exception of urinalysis testing strips and glucometers. As such physicians were described to be practicing battlefield medicine in a M.A.S.H. unit.

== Volunteers ==
Reverend Colonel Pete and Fay Jones

A unique bond between two very disparate groups was formed as a result of the hurricane. Two groups, the Bastrop Christian Outreach Center (BCOC) and attendees of the counter-culture Rainbow Gathering, arrived around the same time in Waveland. The BCOC efforts were led by Reverend Colonel Pete and Fay Jones who were among some of the first responders. Each group represented very different philosophies and had little common faith, each was able to put aside their differences and focus entirely on their humanitarian efforts. The cooperation between the two groups was described as "unlikely", a "bunch of hippies and evangelical Christians" and the "unlikeliest of bedfellows".

== Facilities ==
As all buildings and structures were destroyed due to the high winds and flooding, the entire relief effort took place under temporary, tent-based structures. The cafe was housed in a large geodesic dome, usually found at the Burning Man festival.

The clinic originally started with two tents purchased at a supermarket. After 3 weeks of operation a 20-foot-long (6.1 m), 10-foot-tall (3.0 m) tent was donated and erected. A month later an additional 40-foot-long (12 m), 10-foot-tall (3.0 m) was added on.

== See also ==
- Emergency Communities
- Emergency management
- Hurricane Katrina
- Rainbow Family
