= North American hundred-year floods of 2011 =

Several hundred-year flooding events occurred in 2011. In North America, the following events occurred on separate rivers and tributaries:

- 2011 Assiniboine River flood
- 2011 Lake Champlain and Richelieu River floods
- 2011 Manitoba floods (disambiguation)
- 2011 Mississippi River floods
- 2011 Missouri River flood
- 2011 Musselshell River flood
- 2011 Red River flood
- 2011 Souris River flood
