= 2011 Manitoba floods =

The 2011 Manitoba floods may refer to:

- 2011 Red River flood
- 2011 Assiniboine River flood
- 2011 Souris River flood

== See also ==
- 2011 Mississippi River floods
