= Lake St. Martin =

Lake in Manitoba, Canada

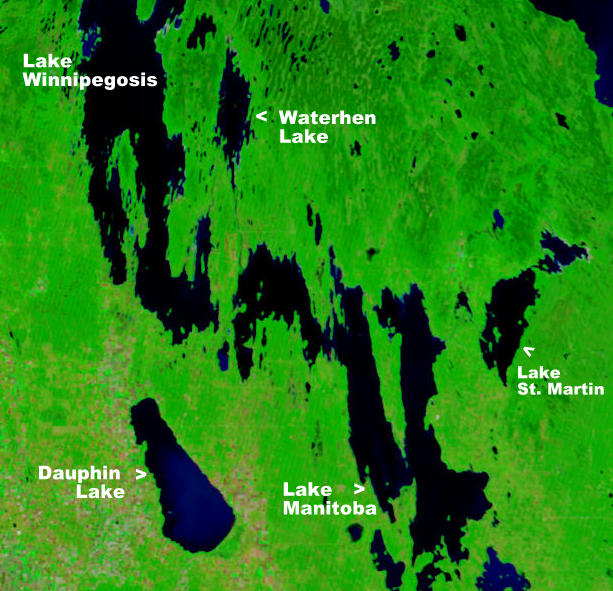
- Lake St. Martin is east of Lake Manitoba

- Location of the lake in Manitoba Lake St. Martin (Canada)
- Location: Manitoba
- Coordinates: 51°37′1″N 98°28′58″W
- Primary inflows: Fairford River
- Primary outflows: Dauphin River (to Lake Winnipeg)
- Basin countries: Canada

Lake St. Martin is a lake in the Interlake region of Manitoba, Canada. The lake is situated between Lake Manitoba and Lake Winnipeg. Lake St. Martin is downstream from the Fairford River with its Fairford River Control Structure. The Fairford River is the only outlet for Lake Manitoba. With the artificially increased flow and limited outflow, Lake St. Martin was turned into a reservoir. The outflow for Lake St. Martin exits through Dauphin River and into Lake Winnipeg, at a lower rate than the water comes in.

Settlements on the lake, including the Lake St. Martin First Nation, were flooded and made uninhabitable after the 2011 Assiniboine River flood.

== Water control structures and flooding operations history ==
=== Fairford River Control Structure ===
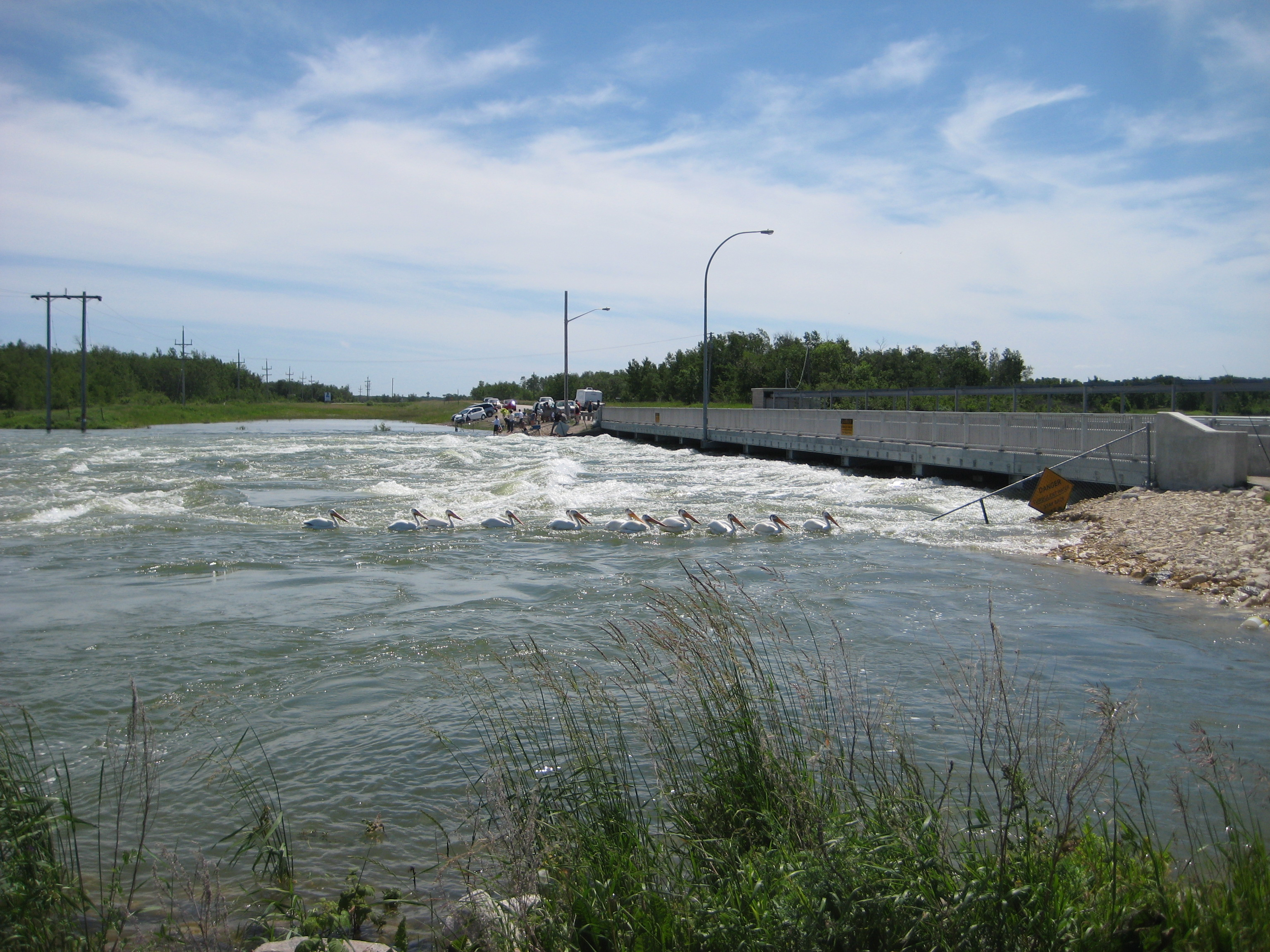
The Fairford River Water Control Structure

Natural flows of water are modified and fluctuated to serve development interests. In 1961, the construction of the Fairford Water Control Structure was finished. The Fairford River connects Lake Manitoba to Lake St. Martin with the water control structure allowing the Province to regulate water levels in Lake Manitoba and flood Lake St. Martin. This resulted in a loss of Indian reserve land in Lake St. Martin.

The water dam on Fairford River changed the shape of the Lake and changed the Lake into a reservoir. Lake St. Martin is negatively impacted by the Fairford Water Control Structure as the water levels are either artificially high or low depending on the rainy or drought conditions (Ahmed, et al., 2019).

=== Portage Diversion ===
In 1970 the Portage Diversion was constructed on the Assiniboine River that brought more water to Lake St. Martin via Lake Manitoba. This Portage Diversion brought water from the Assiniboine River to an entirely different watershed through digging a 29 km long channel to Lake Manitoba. This Portage Diversion was designed to protect Winnipeg and Portage la Prairie from flooding. By diverting water from population centers to Lake St. Martin, the population at risk was changed (Manitoba Infrastructure, nd). This increased water sent from Assiniboine River created even larger water flowing to Lake St. Martin, which caused more land loss.

In Lake St. Martin, agricultural land was transformed into marshland (Schertow et al., 2012). Further, the ecosystem was changed and natural cycles for water disrupted. These disruptions decrease fish population and influence the surrounding settlements of Lake St. Martin (AAE Tech Services Inc. et al., 2016).

=== 2011 flood ===
In 2011, Manitoba was hit with a "superflood" called the Assiniboine flood. To protect Winnipeg, Portage la Prairie, and agricultural land, the provincial government opened the Portage Diversion. The flood waters were diverted into Lake Manitoba, which put many residences and cottages on Lake Manitoba at risk for flooding. To protect cottagers, residences, farmland areas that were Provincial lands with high property values to Lake St. Martin Indigenous reserves that were federal Crown land, without value. The Fairford Water Control Structure was opened to flood thousands of Indigenous people from several reserves. Worst hit was the Lake St. Martin community. Everyone from the Lake St. Martin community was evacuated in an emergency situation and all the homes and buildings were flooded. The outflow from Lake St. Martin was greatly reduced due to ice blockages in the Dauphin River. According to Ahmed et al. The 2011 flood resulted in "the lake area increased by 13%" (2019). To lower the high water levels an emergency channel was pushed through under the Emergency Measures Act. Without an environmental assessment, the major project of the Lake St. Martin Emergency Outlet Channel was constructed and began to operate on November 1, 2011 (Manitoba Minister of Conservation, 2011). The outlet channel lowered lake levels in Lake St. Martin and Lake Manitoba by draining them into Lake Winnipeg. The outlet was closed in 2012 (Manitoba infrastructure, nd).

=== 2014 flood ===
In 2014, another flood event occurred on the Assiniboine River in Manitoba. The Fairford River Water Control Structure was at full capacity draining water into Lake St. Martin. The artificially increased flow caused major flooding for the surrounding communities. The Lake St. Martin emergency channel was only partially opened as the residents around Lake Winnipeg had concerns for their cottages flooding. The channel closed in 2015 (Manitoba Infrastructure, nd).

== Impacts of flooding ==
Indigenous people are most at risk from flooding in Canada and the world (Thistlethwaite et al., 2020). Chakraborty et al. states that "Canadian Indigenous communities bear significant financial, psychological, and social burdens associated with flooding, and they have been disproportionately affected by flood-related displacement" (2021, p. 821).

The area around Lake St. Martin is almost entirely populated by Indigenous people. Those impacted by the flood include Indigenous people living at Pinaymootang, Little Saskatchewan, Lake St. Martin and then on the Lake Winnipeg side — Daphne River First Nation communities (Indigenous services Canada, 2022). The communities had a thriving fishery and agriculture before the flooding. Hunting, fishing and other traditional land uses were a source of sustenance. Due to the Fairford River structure the impacts on the ecosystem greatly reduced the fish population and the land could no longer be used for cattle raising (Westdal, 2013).

=== Evacuation and compensation ===
The peoples who lived on the Lake St. Martin reserve, as well as people from other reserves, were forced to evacuate for the 2011 Assiniboine river flood. The water diversions at Portage and Fairford forced relocations of two communities after eight years of displacement from 2011 to 2019. The Manitoban government decided to divert the water flow to Lake St. Martin First Nation to lessen the impact of flooding on Winnipeg and other non-Indigenous homes and farm lands (Thompson, 2015). The flood damaged all housing and infrastructure at Lake St. Martin and most of Little Saskatchewan caused the need for intensive rebuilding.

The government offered little to no compensation to the indigenous communities, which required the communities to sue the government and delayed their resettlement. In 2019 years after a lengthy court battle the indigenous community received a 90 million dollar settlement making community members eligible for compensation (Hoye, 2019). In 2020, families were still displaced. Though families are returning home, they are deeply traumatized by the displacement and environmental injustice (Hoye, 2019).

== Role of the Manitoba government ==
=== Financial benefits ===
The government of Manitoba made a calculated decision in flooding Lake St. Martin (Ballard, 2012). The water was flowing towards Winnipeg until the province diverted the flood water. The government chose to divert water to Lake St. Martin to flood a lake surrounded by Indigenous reserves. Ballard (2012) explains how the government of Manitoba's decision to flood Lake St. Martin is due to First Nations' reserve land being federal Crown land. In flooding Lake St. Martin the responsibility for financial compensation shifts from the province to the federal government for lands under their jurisdiction. The province saved money from massive flood damage impacting cities under their jurisdiction, despite the environmental damage in reserves on nearby Lake St. Martin.

=== Government and the history of Indigenous flooding ===
Indigenous reserves are at higher risk of flooding than non-Indigenous communities due to the federal government placing Indigenous reserves in swampy and other marginal lands, lack of infrastructure and adequate protection, such as ring dykes, and governments controlling water flows through diversions. The risk of flooding on reserves is high: "81% of the 985 Indigenous land reserves in Canada are at risk of flooding" (Chakraborty et al., 2021). The province and Canadian government needs to reconcile their role in displacing First Nations through flooding and other means. Governments knowing First Nations are most at risk need to invest in flood protection for these communities.

== See also ==
- List of lakes of Manitoba
