= HMCS Montcalm =

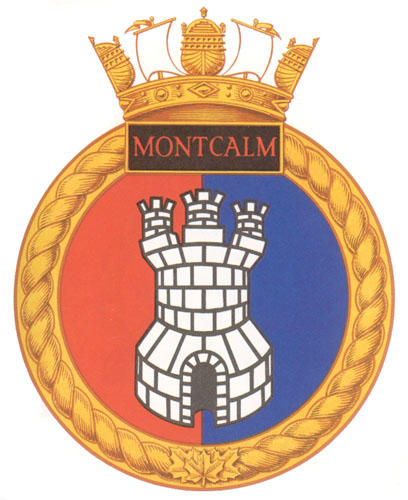
- The ship's badge of HMCS Montcalm (from DND).
- Name: HMCS Montcalm
- Namesake: Louis-Joseph de Montcalm
- Commissioned: 1923
- Motto: Disponible pour servir (Available to serve)
- Status: Operational

General characteristics
- Class & type: Naval reserve division
- Type: Stone frigate

HMCS Montcalm is a reserve unit of the Royal Canadian Navy based in Quebec City, Quebec. As with all Naval Reserve divisions, its approximately 150 sailors specialize in domestic emergency readiness, port inspection diving, naval intelligence, and the recruiting and retention of personnel who supplement the Royal Canadian Navy on board ship and at shore establishments.

== Operations ==
HMCS Montcalm's personnel provide on-going augmentation to Royal Canadian Navy operations and exercises on ships and at shore establishments on a full- and part-time basis.

Domestically, HMCS Montcalm contributes assets in the form of personnel and equipment to aid to the civil power operations. In the past, these have included the 1995 G7 summit in Halifax, Nova Scotia, the 1997 Red River flood, the 1998 ice storm, the 1998 crash of Swissair Flight 111, the 2010 Winter Olympics in Vancouver, British Columbia, and the 2011 floods on the Richelieu River in Quebec and throughout Manitoba.

Throughout the Cold War, HMCS Montcalm provided hundreds of trained augmentees in support of naval and joint operations, as well as to the Korean War and the First Gulf War. The unit also provided personnel to the Afghanistan war and subsequent training mission, and to numerous United Nations peacekeeping missions and NATO operations.

== Commanding officers ==
The following officers were commanding officer of HMCS Montcalm:

- Sub-lieutenant C.L. Gauvreau (1923–1925)
- Lieutenant (navy) L.J.M. Gauvreau (1925)
- Sub-lieutenant J.A.C. Pettigrew (1925–1935)
- Lieutenant-commander J.M.E. Beaudoin-Lemieux (1935–1937)
- Sub-lieutenant J.A.C. Pettigrew (1937–1938)
- Lieutenant-commander F.A. Price (1938–1940)
- Lieutenant (navy) K.L. Johnson (1940–1942)
- Lieutenant (navy) R.M.S. St-Laurent (1942–1943)
- Lieutenant (navy) E.F. Noel (1943–1946)
- Lieutenant (navy) T.S.R. Peacock (1946)
- Lieutenant (navy) M.J.A.T. Jetté (1946–1947)
- Lieutenant (navy) J.B.A. Berubé (1947–1949)
- Lieutenant (navy) E.F. Noel (1949–1951)
- Lieutenant (navy) M.J.A.T. Jetté (1951–1952)
- Lieutenant-commander W.G. Mylett (1952–1956)
- Commander P. Langlais (1956–1962)
- Lieutenant-commander W.G. Mylett (1962–1963)
- Commander J.P. Jobin (1963–1968)
- Commander P.J. Gwyn (1968–1971)
- Commander R. Langlois (1971–1974)
- Commander J. Dallaire (1974–1977)
- Commander P. Houle (1977–1981)
- Commander J.C. Michaud (1981–1986)
- Commander P. Houle (1986–1989)
- Commander J. Leveillé (1989–1993)
- Lieutenant-commander C.R. LeClerc (1993–1994)
- Lieutenant-commander P. Tessier (1994–1996)
- Lieutenant-commander G. Ross (1996–1998)
- Commander A. Dubuc (1998–2003)
- Lieutenant-commander M. Audy (2003–2006)
- Commander L. Morin (2006–2009)
- Commander É. Landry (2009–2012)
- Lieutenant-commander P.L. Girard (2012–2015)
- Lieutenant-commander J.Y.G. Boulet (2015–2018)
- Commander P.L. Girard (2018–2019)
- Commander J.Y.G. Boulet (2019–2020)
- Commander M. Bouchard (2020–2023)
- Commander J-F. LeBlanc (2023–present)

== See also ==
- Canadian Forces
- Royal Canadian Navy
- Stone Frigate
