= 2011 Musselshell River flood =

2011 flood in Montana, USA

The 2011 flooding on the Musselshell River in Montana began about May 21, affecting large parts of central Montana. At Mosby, Montana, the river crested at 16 feet (4.9 m) on Monday, May 23. The flood level at Mosby is 8 feet (2.4 m) and the record crest at that point along the Musselshell is 17.7 feet (5.4 m), set in 1993. The flooding was caused by up to 8 inches (200 mm) of rain combined with snowmelt.

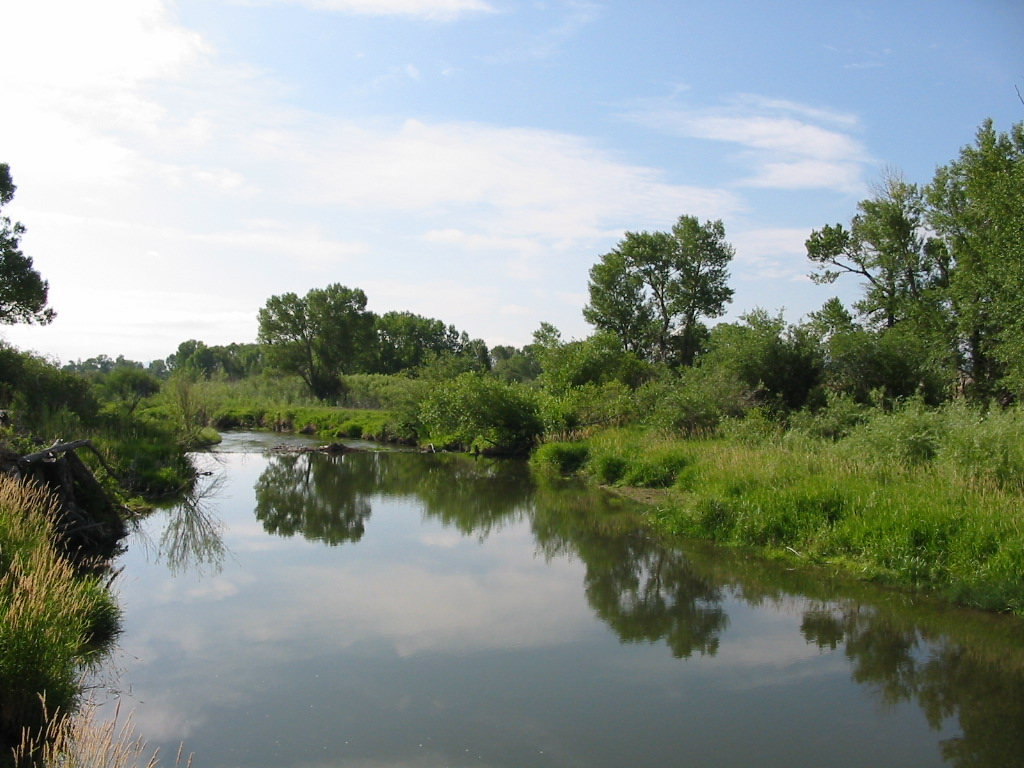
Banks of the Musselshell River near Selkirk.

On May 24 at Shawmut, near Harlowton, a record pace was set, with a flow rate of 3,670 cubic feet per second (104 m^{3}/s). The average flow is 183 cu ft/s (5.2 m^{3}/s) at that spot for May 24. The prior record at Shawmut was set in 2005 with a rate of 802 cu ft/s (22.7 m^{3}/s). Several roads in the Musselshell watershed were already closed by this date.

The town of Roundup suffered the most damage of any community along the Musselshell. Potable water, food, and medicine were major concerns. Flood waters along the Musselshell near Roundup were as much as 6 feet (1.8 m) deep, cresting over the weekend. Flooding near Roundup was at least 2 feet (0.61 m) above record flood level and forced the evacuation of dozens of homes. On Thursday, May 26 the flooding inundated portions of Roundup, At Highway 87 the floodwaters were flowing at over 3,670 cu ft/s (104 m^{3}/s), more than 10 times the normal rate. On May 26 the Musselshell crested near Roundup at 14.16 feet (4.32 m). Its flood stage there is 10 feet (3.0 m). The previous record for that location was set in 1975 at 12.89 feet (3.93 m). In Petroleum County alone damage costs were estimated at US$1.5 million.

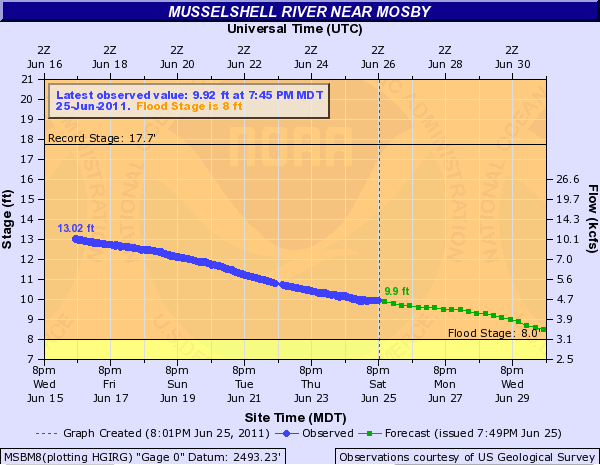
Hydrograph of observed and predicted river levels for the Musselshell River at Mosby on June 25, 2011.

By June 23, the Musselshell had receded back below its banks, FEMA had assessed damage to public lands and was back in Roundup to assess damage to private lands and properties.

Flooding on the unconnected Yellowstone River to the south prompted the closing of a 20 miles (32 km) portion of Interstate 90 from Livingston to Springdale. Floodwaters from the tributary Pryor creek led to closing of Pompeys Pillar National Monument. The Little Bighorn River and related tributaries flooded the area around Crow Agency and shut down Interstate 90 from Hardin to the Wyoming line for several days. Montana counties that were affected by the state-wide flooding in Spring 2011 include: Big Horn, Carbon, Garfield, Granite, Jefferson, Judith Basin, Missoula, Musselshell, Petroleum, Sanders, Wheatland, and Yellowstone. A state of emergency was declared in 51 Montana counties, cities, and Indian reservations. Flood waters from the Musselshell, Yellowstone, and several other Montana rivers flow into the Missouri River and Mississippi River, exacerbating the 2011 flooding in states such as North Dakota and South Dakota.

== See also ==
- 2011 Mississippi River floods
- 2011 Missouri River Flood
