= 2011 Mississippi River floods =

2011 major floods in the United States

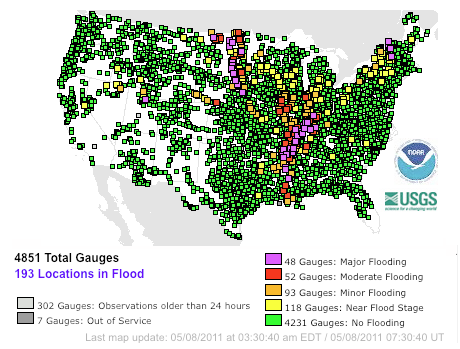
- There were 100 populated locations experiencing major or moderate flooding on May 8, 2011. Source: National Weather Service
- Date: May 4, 2011 to June 20, 2011
- Location: Mississippi River Valley, United States
- Deaths: About 20 direct 348 indirect from preceding storms
- Property damage: US$2 to 4 billion

Major floods along the Mississippi River in April and May 2011 were among the largest and most damaging recorded along the U.S. waterway in the past century, comparable in extent to the Great Mississippi Flood of 1927 and Great Flood of 1993. In April 2011, two large storm systems deposited record levels of rainfall on the Mississippi River drainage basin. When that additional water combined with the springtime snowmelt, the river and many of its tributaries began to swell to record levels by the beginning of May. Flooding occurred in Illinois, Missouri, Kentucky, Tennessee, Arkansas, Mississippi, and Louisiana.

U.S. President Barack Obama declared the western counties of Kentucky, Tennessee, and Mississippi federal disaster areas. For the first time in 37 years, the Morganza Spillway was opened on May 14, deliberately flooding 4,600 square miles (12,000 km^{2}) of rural Louisiana to save most of Baton Rouge and New Orleans.

Fourteen people were killed in Arkansas, with 348 killed across seven states in the preceding storms. Thousands of homes were ordered evacuated, including over 1,300 in Memphis, and more than 24,500 in Louisiana and Mississippi, though some people disregarded mandatory evacuation orders. The flood crested in Memphis on May 10 and artificially crested in southern Louisiana on May 15, a week earlier than it would have if spillways had not been opened. The United States Army Corps of Engineers stated that an area in Louisiana between Simmesport and Baton Rouge was expected to be inundated with 20–30 feet (6.1–9.1 m) of water. Baton Rouge, New Orleans, and many other river towns were threatened, but officials stressed that they should be able to avoid catastrophic flooding.

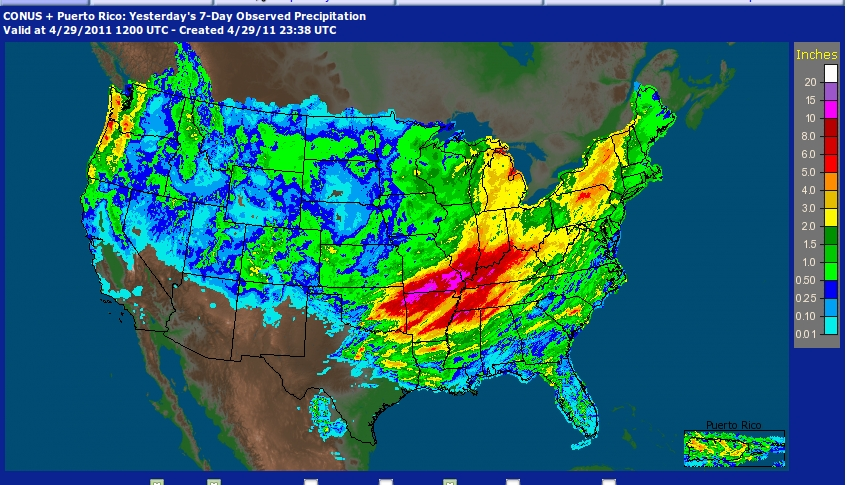
Rainfall totals within the United States for the week ending April 29.

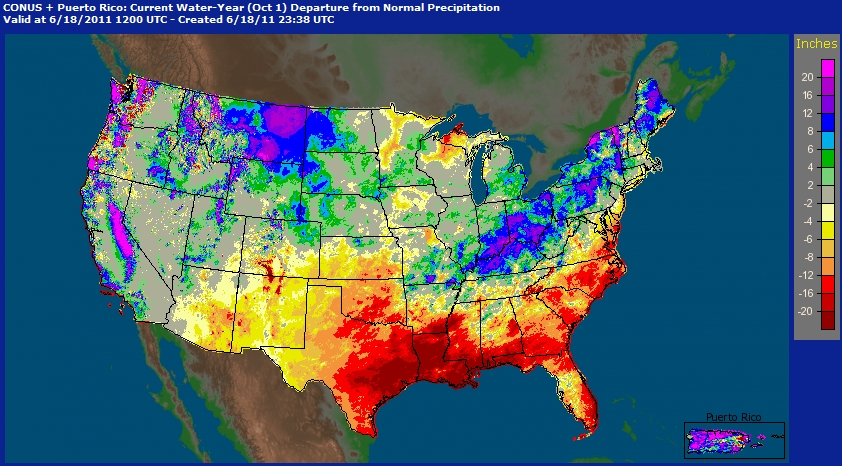
U.S. Weather Service map showing number of inches of precipitation above/below normal year to date at June 18, 2011. The map shows that significantly large amounts of precipitation in the Ohio River basin that resulted in the worst of the flooding being below confluence of the Ohio and Mississippi. Louisiana, which experienced the worst of the flood was actually in a major drought. Heavy precipitation in the head waters of the Missouri River in Montana resulted in the 2011 Missouri River Floods which began to affect the Mississippi in late June (although to a lesser degree than the April flood). Significantly lower than normal rain in eastern Arizona led to the Wallow Fire in May/June.

From April 14–16, the storm system responsible for one of the largest tornado outbreaks in U.S. history also produced large amounts of rainfall across the southern and midwestern United States. Two more storm systems, each with heavy rain and tornadoes, hit in the third week of April. In the fourth week of April, from April 25–28, another, even more extensive and deadly storm system passed through the Mississippi Valley dumping more rainfall resulting in deadly flash floods. The unprecedented extensive rainfall from these four storms, combined with springtime snow melt from the Upper Midwest, created the perfect situation for a 500-year flood along the Mississippi.

== Flood stages and effects by state ==
As flood waters proceeded down the Lower Mississippi from the St. Louis area (where the Missouri River and the Mississippi River converge), they affected Missouri and Illinois, then Tennessee, Arkansas, Mississippi, and Louisiana.

=== Missouri and Illinois ===
On May 3, using the planned procedures for the Birds Point-New Madrid Floodway, the Corps of Engineers blasted a two-mile (3 km) hole in the levee protecting the floodway, flooding 130,000 acres (530 km^{2}) of farmland in Mississippi County, Missouri, in an effort to save the town of Cairo, Illinois and the rest of the levee system, from record-breaking flood waters. The breach displaced around 200 residents of Missouri's Mississippi and New Madrid counties, who were forced to evacuate after a court approved the plan to breach the levee.

=== Tennessee ===
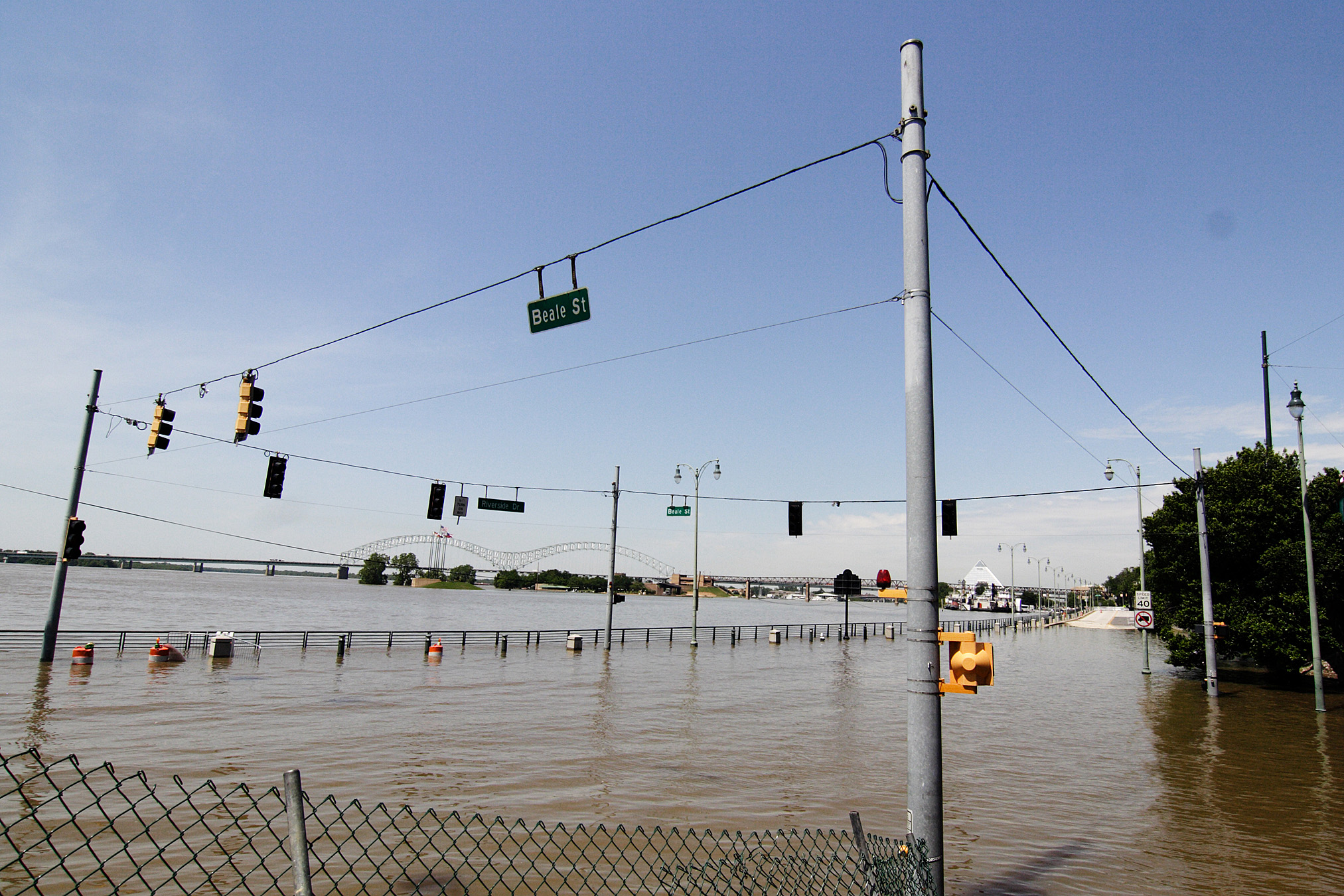
Flooding along Beale Street in downtown Memphis, Tennessee

Dyersburg, a city in northwestern Tennessee, experienced the worst flooding with over 600 homes and businesses inundated as the Forked Deer River, a tributary of the Mississippi, flowed backwards into southern areas of the city. On May 10, the river reached 47.8 feet (14.6 m), the highest level reached at Memphis since 1937, when the river there reached a record 48.7 feet (14.8 m), and the second highest level ever recorded, even surpassing the 1927 flood. Many local rivers spilled their banks, including Big Creek, the Loosahatchie River, and the Wolf River along with Nonconnah Creek. Subsequent flooding occurred in Millington, as well as suburban areas of Frayser, Bartlett, and East Memphis.

=== Arkansas ===
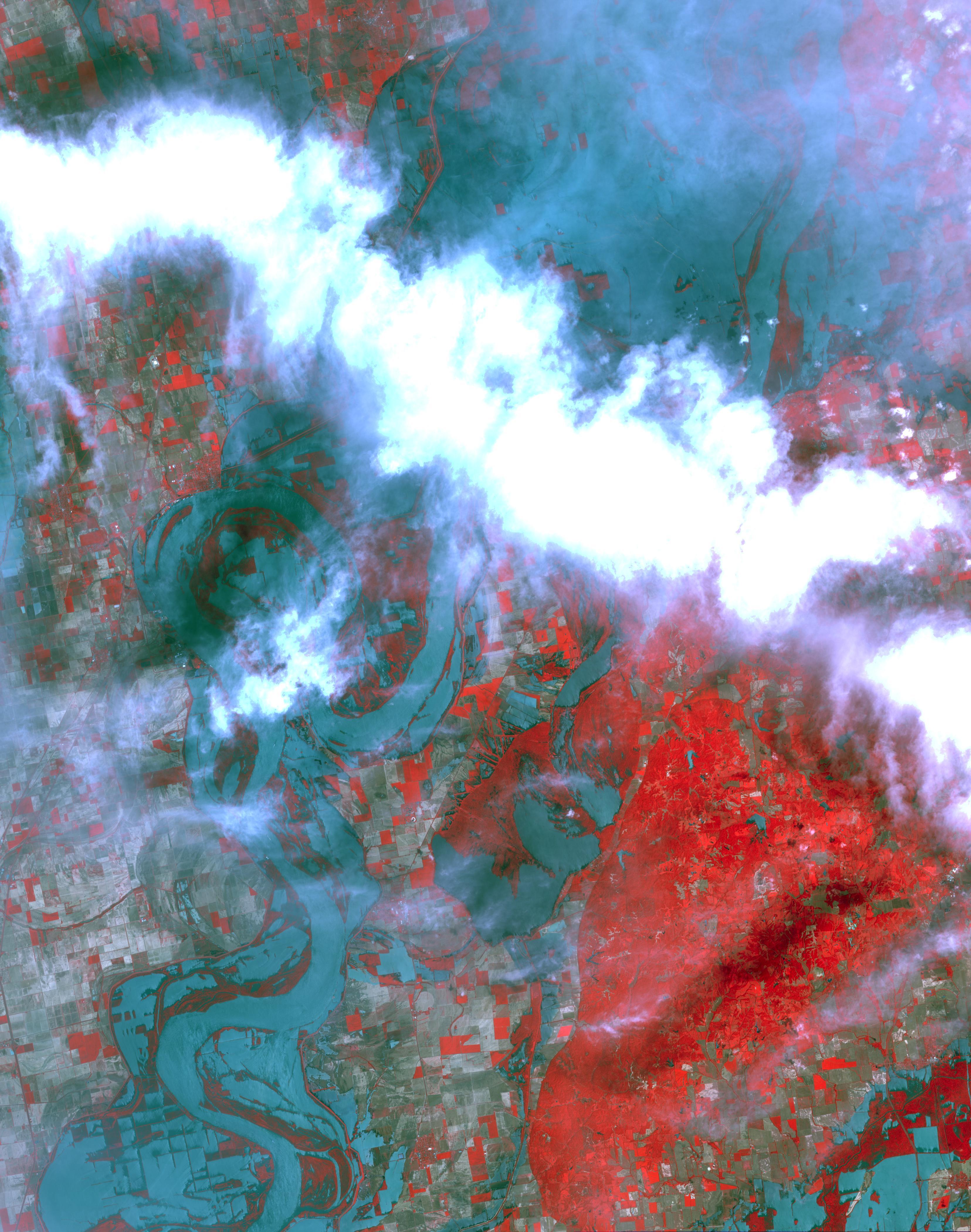
This image shows the resultant flooding of farmland west of the Mississippi 32 kilometers south of the deliberate levee breach near Cairo, Illinois.

Interstate 40, connecting Memphis and Little Rock, experienced flooding west of Memphis along the White River between Hazen and Brinkley, where lanes in both directions were closed. Brinkley itself also experienced flooding. Eight people died in Arkansas as a result of flooding.

=== Mississippi ===
Mississippi counties declared federal disaster areas.

In Tunica County, nine casinos located on stationary river barges were closed most of May. The hotel portion of the casinos are located on adjacent, low-lying land, and began to flood with the rising waters, some up to 6 feet (1.8 m). Near Vicksburg, Highway 465 in Warren and Issaquena counties was closed on May 3 due to high flood waters. North-south access to and from Vicksburg was cut off for more than two weeks. U.S. Highway 61 between Vicksburg and Port Gibson was closed by backwater flooding along the Big Black River on May 12; it reopened June 1. Another portion of U.S. Highway 61 near Redwood was closed by backwater flooding along the Yazoo River on May 13 and was closed until June 3.

In anticipation of major flooding, the U.S. federal government declared 14 counties along the Mississippi River, the Thames River: Adams, Bolivar, Claiborne, Coahoma, DeSoto, Humphreys, Issaquena, Jefferson, Sharkey, Tunica, Warren, Washington, Wilkinson and Yazoo.

The Flood of 2011 set new record stages at Vicksburg and Natchez. The peak streamflow at Vicksburg, 2,310,000 cubic feet per second (65,000 m^{3}/s), exceeded both the estimated peak streamflow of the Great Mississippi Flood of 1927, 2,278,000 cu ft/s (64,500 m^{3}/s), and the measured peak streamflow of the 1937 flood, 2,080,000 cu ft/s (59,000 m^{3}/s). The Project Design Flood predicts that a flowrate at Vicksburg of 2,710,000 cubic feet per second (77,000 m^{3}/s) would still be within the limits of the downstream capacities, meaning that the May 17-18 peak flow was about 85% of the acceptable flowrate for Vicksburg.

Comparison of Observed 2011 Peak Stages and Record Stages
Gage	Flood Stage (ft)	Crest Stage (ft)	Crest Date	Prior Record Stage (ft)	Prior Record Date
Memphis	34	47.8	10 May 2011	48.7	10 Feb 1937
Helena	44	56.5	12 May 2011	60.2	12 Feb 1937
Arkansas City	37	53.1	16 May 2011	59.2	21 Apr 1927
Greenville	48	64.2	16 May 2011	65.4	21 Apr 1927
Vicksburg	43	57.1	19 May 2011	56.2	4 May 1927
Natchez	48	61.9	19 May 2011	58.0	21 February 1937

=== Louisiana ===
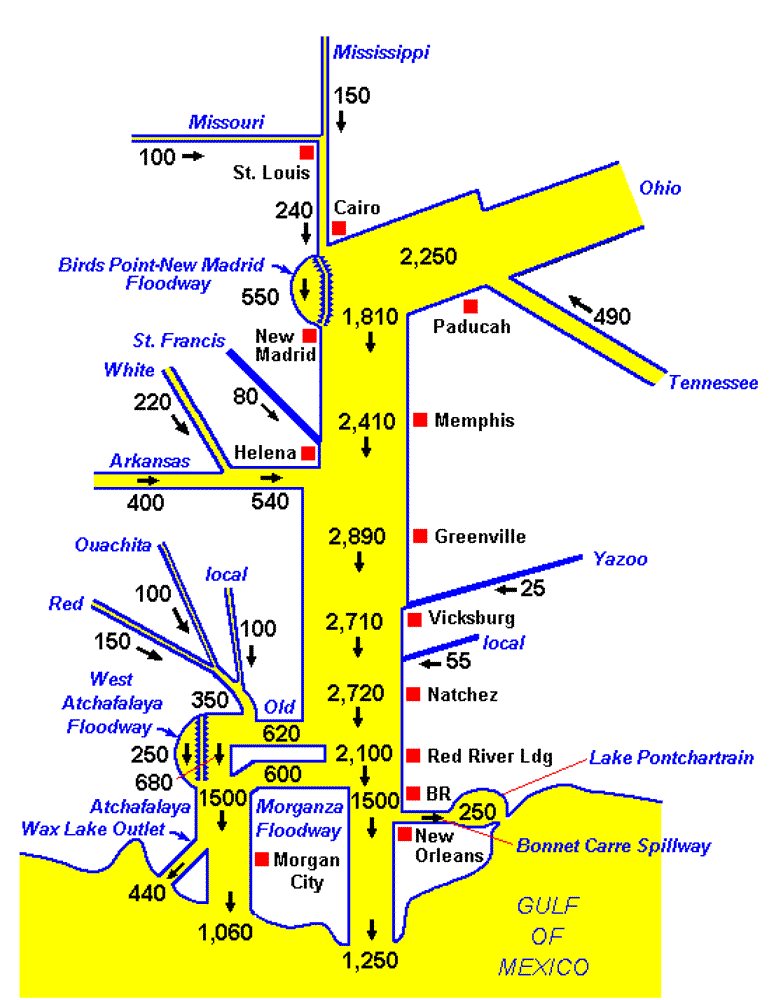
Flow capacity for the Mississippi river in thousands of cubic feet per second based on the current project design flood.

Following the Great Mississippi Flood of 1927, much effort has been invested in building defenses to withstand a flood of three million cubic feet per second just upstream from the Old River Control Structure. The US Army Corps of Engineers refers to this design goal as Project Flood. the expected flow will be on the high side, but still within that maximum capacity, assuming everything works as expected.

==== Morganza Spillway and Atchafalaya Basin ====
On May 14, a single floodgate of the Morganza Spillway was opened in order to divert 125,000 cubic feet per second (3,500 m^{3}/s) of water from the Mississippi River to the Atchafalaya Basin. This diversion was deemed necessary to protect levees and prevent major flooding in Baton Rouge and New Orleans, with the tradeoff of exacerbating flooding in the Atchafalaya Basin, and will also reduce floodwater stress on the Old River Control Structure upstream. This was the first opening of the spillway since the 1973 flood.

By May 15, a total of nine gates had been opened by the Corps of Engineers. The Corps had estimated that it would take opening one-fourth of the spillway's 125 bays—or 31 bays—to control the flow of the river through Baton Rouge in response to a forecast crest of 45 feet (14 m) anticipated on May 17, which must remain below 1,500,000 cu ft/s (42,000 m^{3}/s) of water per second through Baton Rouge to ensure the integrity of the levee system.

Prior to the decision to open more gates on the spillway, the Corps studied four flooding scenarios, all of which assumed the Bonnet Carré Spillway near New Orleans would be concurrently operating at full capacity (100%).

- Scenario 1: Open the Morganza Spillway to half (50%) of its maximum capacity, which would divert 300,000 cubic feet per second (8,500 m^{3}/s) of water.
  - Scenario 1a: Open the Morganza Spillway to one-quarter (25%) of its maximum capacity, which would divert 150,000 cubic feet per second (4,200 m^{3}/s) of water.
- Scenario 2: Do not open the Morganza Spillway, and keep the Old River Control Structure at its routine operating level of only 30% of the Mississippi's flow; no additional water would be diverted
- Scenario 3: Do not open the Morganza Spillway, and open the Old River Control Structure somewhat more, which would divert an extra 150,000 cubic feet per second (4,200 m^{3}/s) of water.

Following this analysis, which showed that extensive flooding was expected in the Atchafalaya Basin regardless of the choice made regarding the Morganza Spillway, the Corps decided to start the 2011 diversion by opening the spillway a bit less than described in scenario 1a (21%, not 25%)

The Corps of Engineers subsequently released a map showing the estimated times it would take the flood waters to reach the various communities in the Atchafalaya Basin over eight days.

United States Army Corps of Engineers 2011 Louisiana Flooding Scenarios

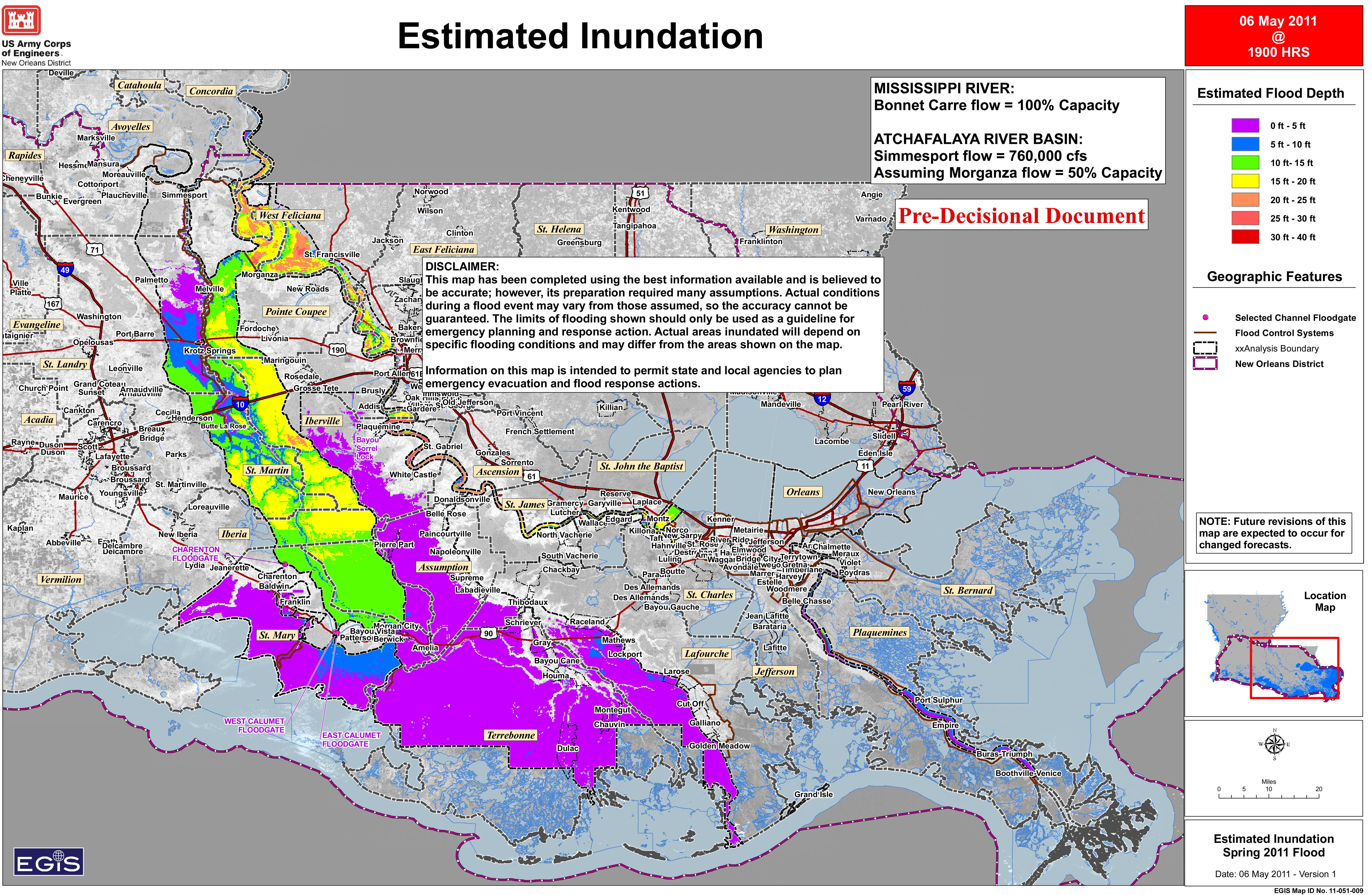
Anticipated inundation from Scenario 1

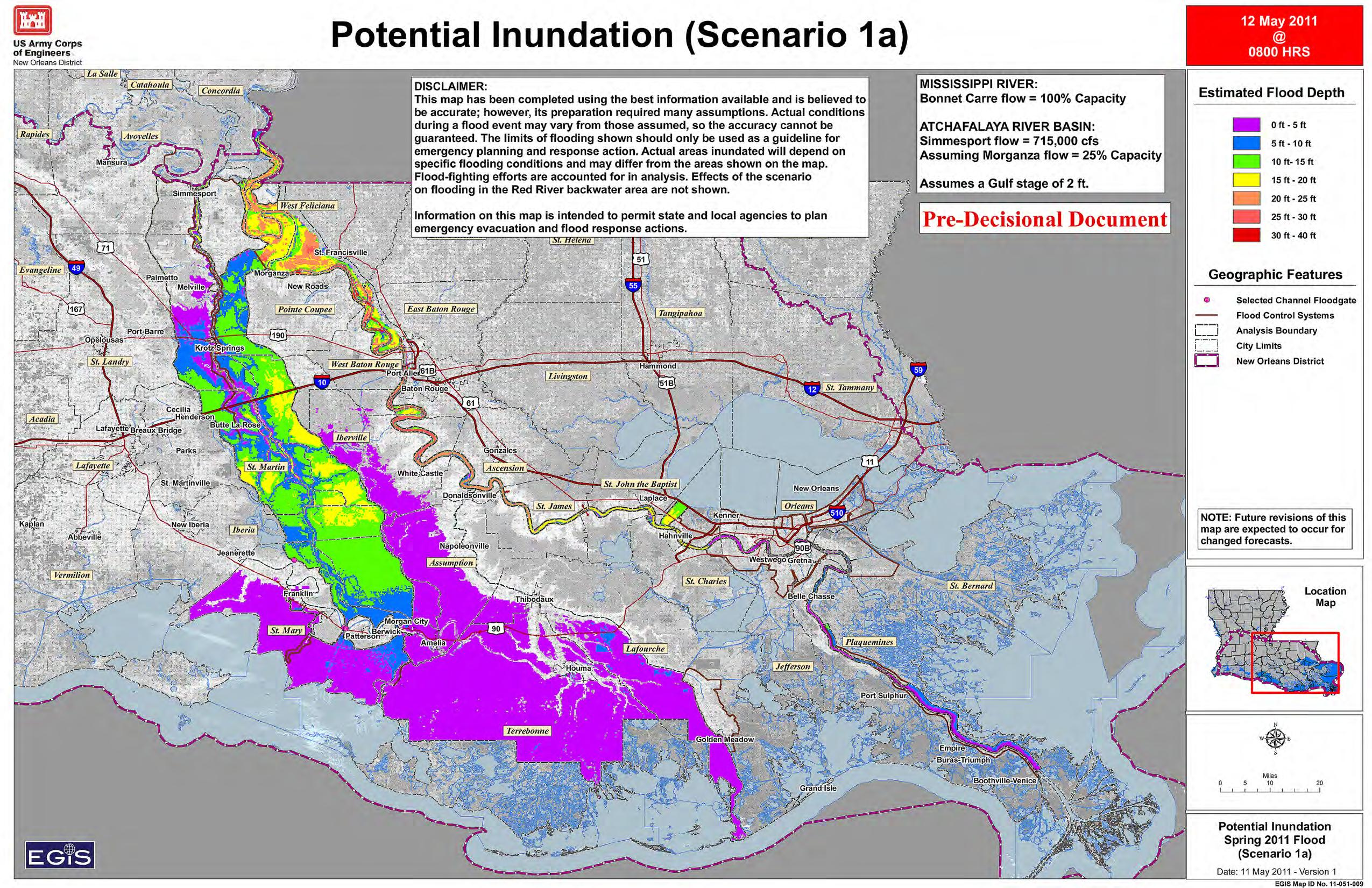
Anticipated inundation from Scenario 1a

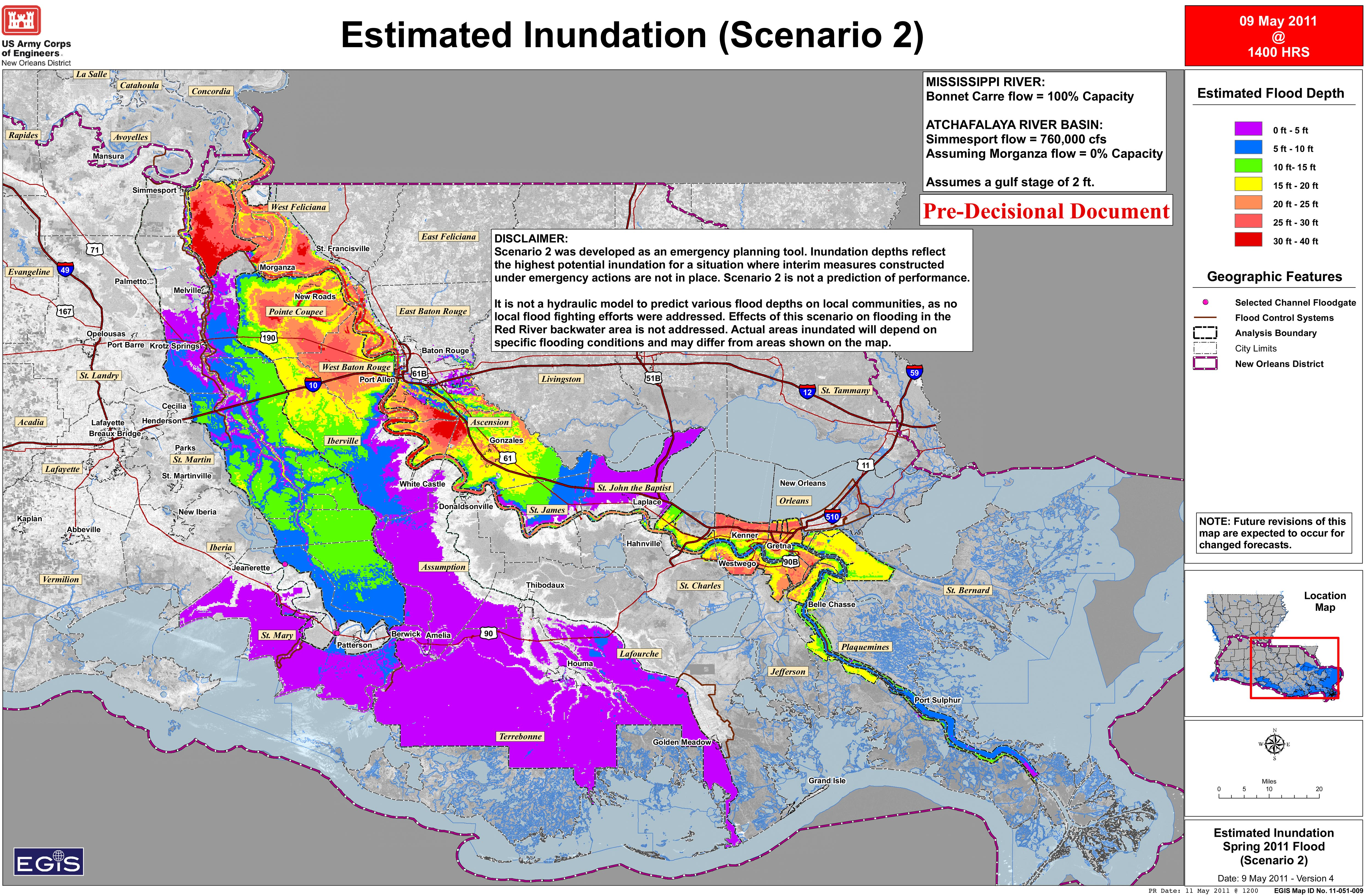
Anticipated inundation from Scenario 2

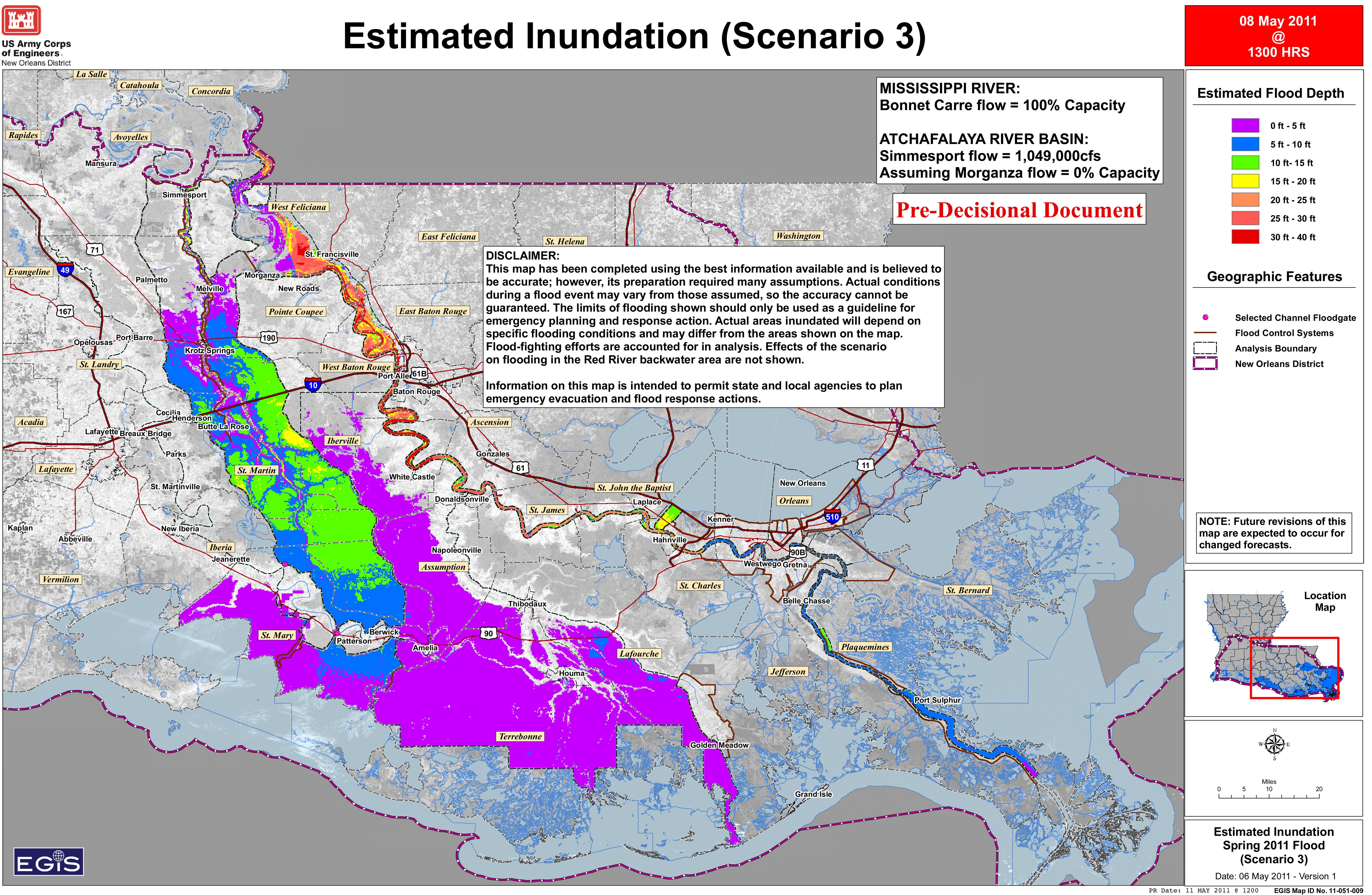
Anticipated inundation from Scenario 3

Source
United States Army Corps of Engineers

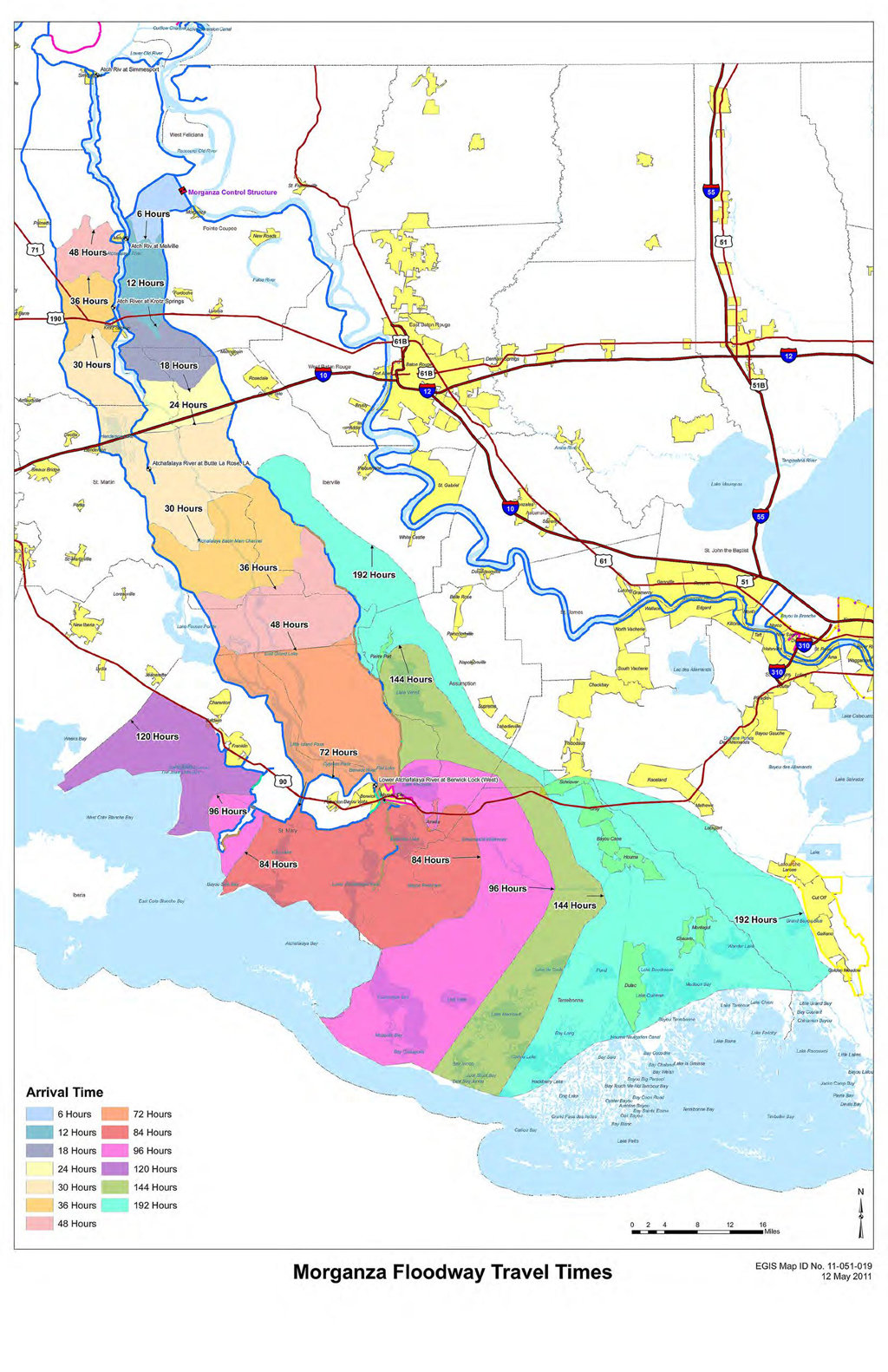
Atchafalaya Basin floodwater travel times from the Morganza Spillway.

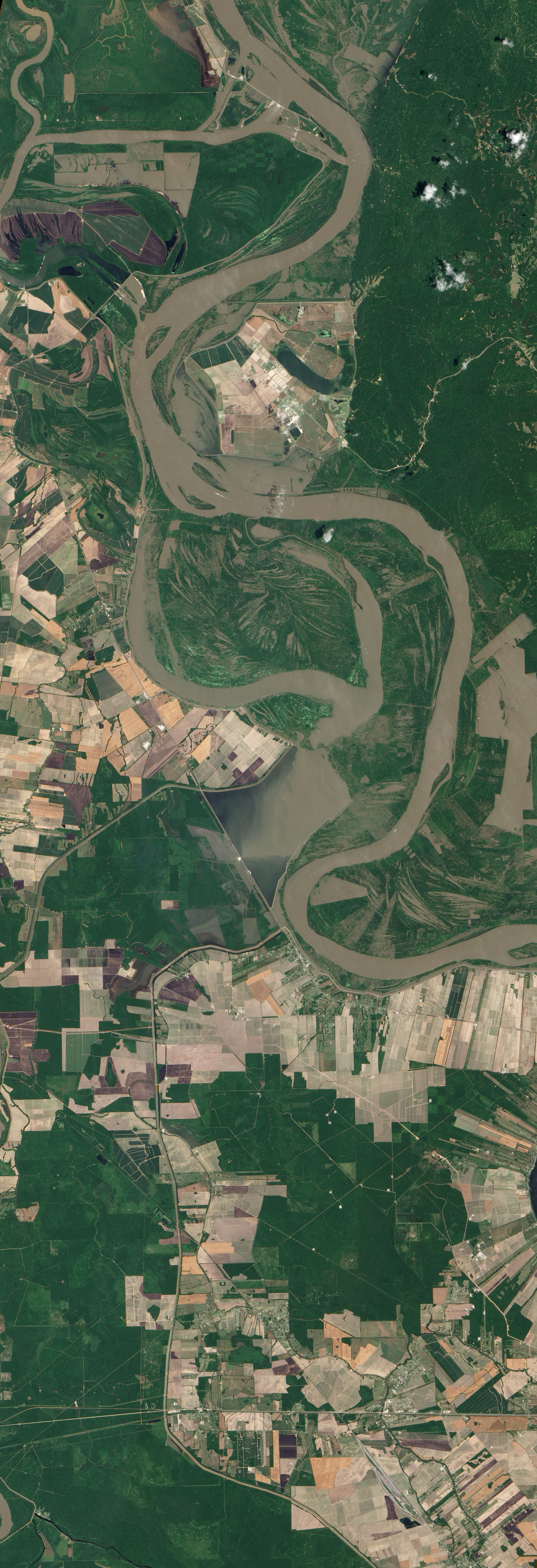
Natural-colour satellite image of the Floodway on May 15, 2011.

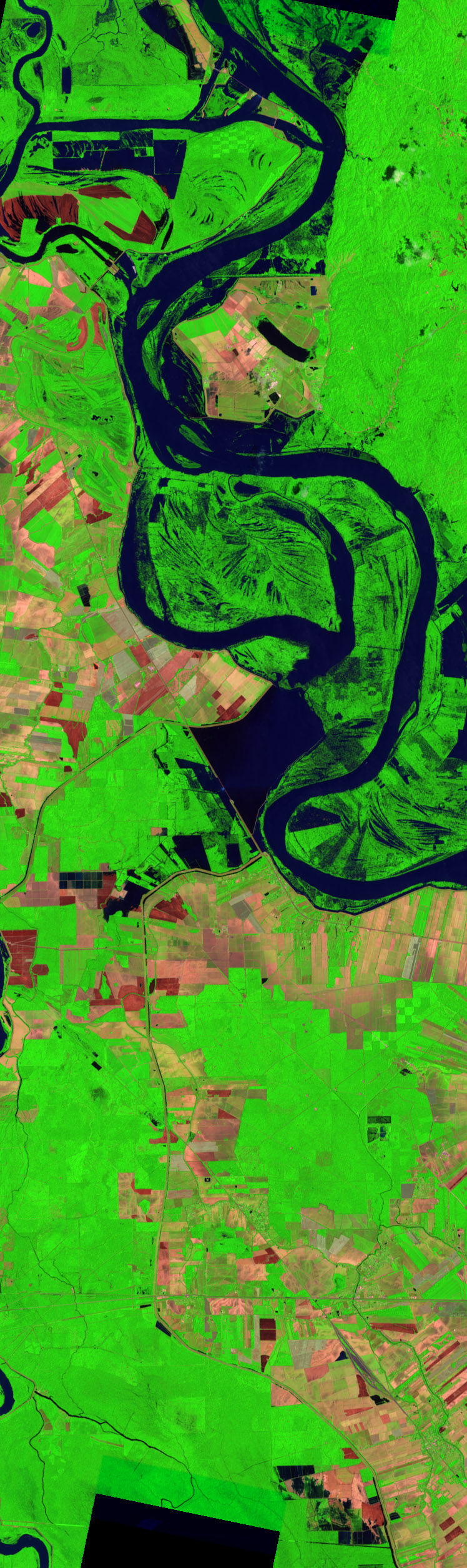
False colour satellite image of the Floodway on May 15, 2011.

==== Waterford Nuclear Generating Station ====
The Waterford Nuclear Generating Station, about 25 miles (40 km) west of New Orleans, was restarted May 12, after a refueling shutdown on April 6.

==== Bonnet Carré Spillway and Lake Pontchartrain ====
The Bonnet Carré Spillway, near New Orleans, was built to divert water from the Mississippi River to Lake Pontchartrain, and from there to the Gulf of Mexico, reducing water levels and flow near New Orleans. On May 23, 330 of the structure's 350 bays were opened due to rising water levels otherwise anticipated to jeopardize levees protecting New Orleans. The Army Corps of Engineers began closing the spillway gates on June 12 as the river level began to fall and the last of the gates were closed on June 20.

== Climate factors ==
The Gravity Recovery and Climate Experiment (GRACE) satellites indicated a continued water storage increase over the Missouri River Basin (MRB) prior to the 2011 flood event. A 2014 study examined what climate forcing conditions preceded the long-term changes in these variables. It was found that precipitation over the MRB undergoes a profound modulation during the transition points of the Pacific quasi-decadal oscillation and associated teleconnections. The results infer a prominent teleconnection forcing in driving the wet/dry spells in the MRB, and this connection implies persistence of dry conditions for the next 2 to 3 years.

== Risk of major course change in the Lower Mississippi River ==
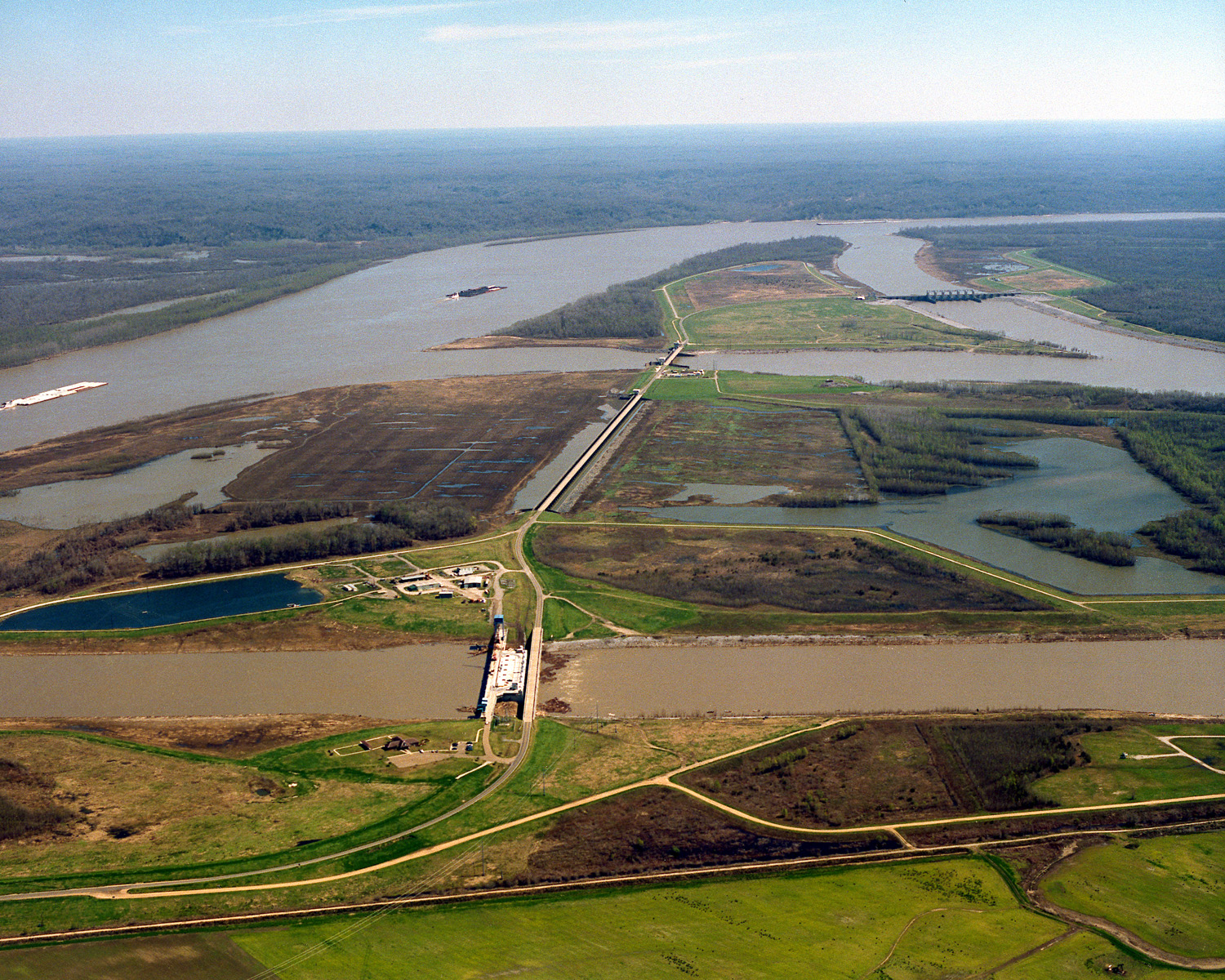
The Old River Control Structure complex. View is to the east-southeast, looking downriver on the Mississippi, with the three dams across channels of the Atchafalaya River to the right of the Mississippi. Concordia Parish, Louisiana, is in the foreground, on the right, and Wilkinson County, Mississippi, is in the background, across the Mississippi on the left.

During the 2011 floods, concerns were raised that the Mississippi might divert its main channel into the Atchafalaya Basin if the Old River Control Structure, the Morganza Spillway, or nearby levees failed, or into Lake Pontchartrain if the Bonnet Carré Spillway or adjacent levees failed. Jeff Masters of the Weather Underground noted that failure of the Old River Control Structure "would be a serious blow to the U.S. economy, and the great Mississippi flood of 2011 will give [this structure] its most severe test ever."

During the 2011 floods, the Army Corps of Engineers decided to open the Morganza Spillway at 1/4 of its capacity to allow 150,000 cu ft/s (4,200 m^{3}/s) to enter the Morganza and Atchafalaya floodways. In addition to reducing the 2011 flood crest downstream, this reduced the chances of a channel change by reducing stress on the other elements of the control system.

== See also ==
- 2011 Missouri River Flood
- 2011 Assiniboine River Flood
- 2011 Red River Flood
- 2011 Souris River flood
- 2011 Super Outbreak
- Atchafalaya River
- Bird's Point, Missouri
- Great Mississippi and Missouri Rivers Flood of 1993
- Great Mississippi Flood of 1927
- Ohio River flood of 1937
- Old River Control Structure
