= Crest (hydrology) =

In hydrology, crest is the highest level above a certain point (the datum point, or reference point) that a river will reach in a certain amount of time. This term is usually limited to a flooding event and from ground level.
