= 2011 Souris River flood =

2011 flood affecting Canada and USA

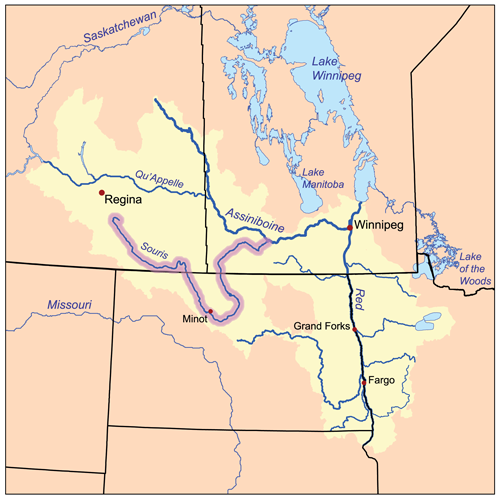
The Red River drainage basin, with the Souris River highlighted

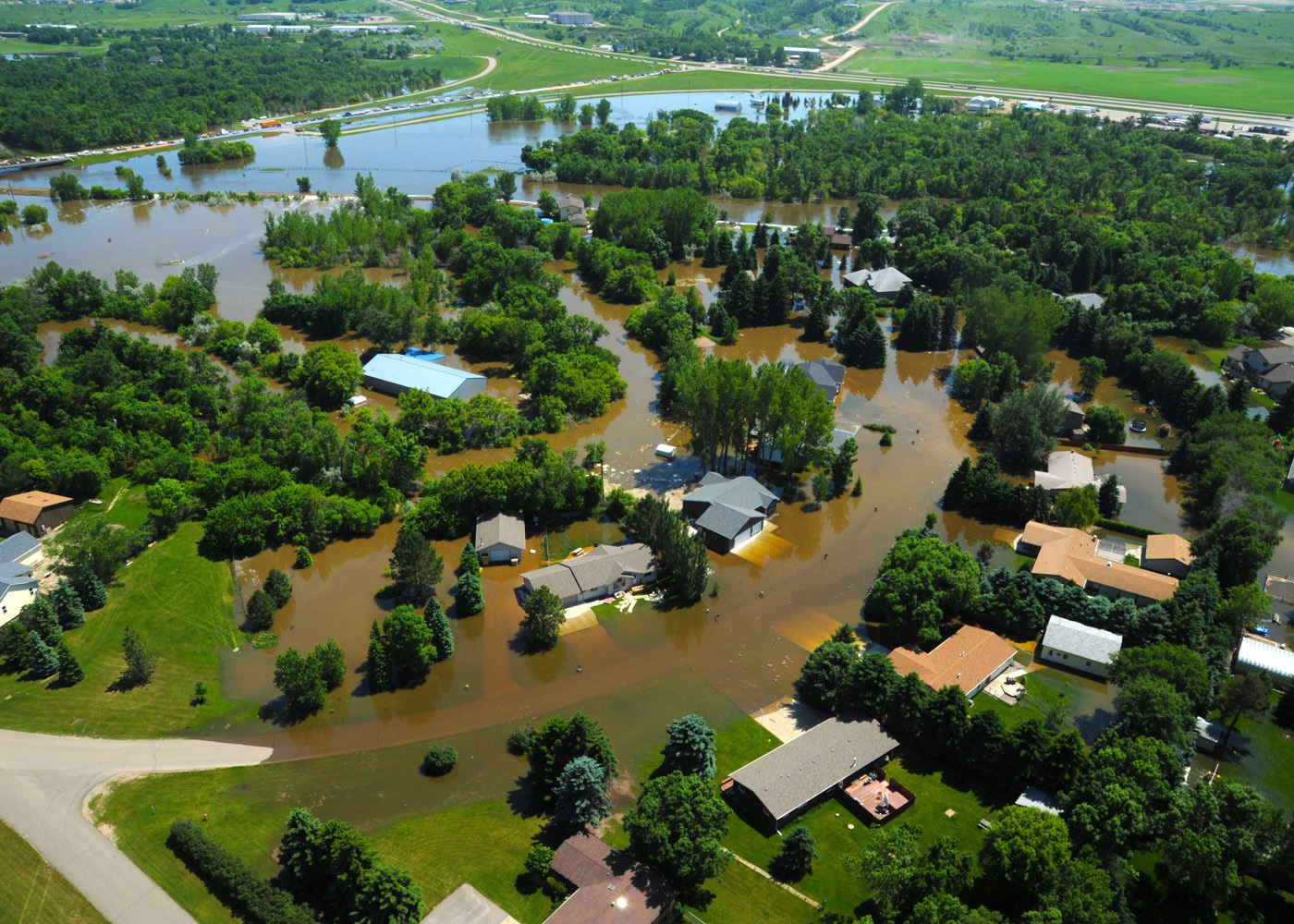
Flooding in Minot on June 23

The 2011 Souris/Mouse River flood in Canada and the United States occurred in June and was greater than a hundred-year flooding event for the river. The US Army Corps of Engineers estimated the flood to have a recurrence interval of two to five centuries.

The Souris River begins in southeastern Saskatchewan, flows southeast into North Dakota, then to southwestern Manitoba. It is a tributary of the Assiniboine River, which it meets near Treesbank, Manitoba, and flows east to meet the Red River of the North in Winnipeg.

The flooding affected Saskatchewan and North Dakota; notably in Minot, where it overtopped levees and caused the evacuation of about 11,000 residents. The flooding in Minot was worse than the 1969 and 1881 floods; many other towns along the river were affected and many acres of farmland were inundated.

== Background ==
Flooding in Saskatchewan the previous summer, in addition to heavy snowfall and a thick snowpack from the previous La Niña winter added to overflow on rivers across North America. In May 2011, heavy rains and thunderstorms driven by a series of cut off lows migrating westward triggered more flooding on watersheds in the southern Prairie Provinces, as some communities received nearly the annual rainfall in less than two months.

== Flood effects ==
=== Saskatchewan ===
In early May, flash flooding occurred between the Souris River source and the Assiniboine River, as Kingsley No. 124, Saskatchewan saw its worst flooding in over 50 years. Towards late May, barely half Saskatchewan's agricultural crops had been seeded, while southeastern Saskatchewan, surrounding the Souris River was the worst-hit. However, even as the flooding continued in northern Saskatchewan, Alberta, and the Northwest Territories, significant fires burned while the weather remained dry and lightning was able to spark new blazes.

On June 17, Weyburn, Saskatchewan became one of 19 provincial communities to declare a state of emergency from the severe flooding, after a power outage caused the failure of the city's waste treatment plant; Saskatoon, surrounding the South Saskatchewan River, also experienced street-level floods. The next day, more flash flooding resulted in flooded homes and basements from Regina to Weyburn, while Estevan declared a state of emergency from flooding.

By June 19, a dike breach flooded the village of Roche Percee, Saskatchewan, forcing about 150 residents to evacuate. A trailer park in downstream Estevan also evacuated about 400 people. Several major highways, including part of Highway 47, Saskatchewan Highway 56, and the Trans-Canada Highway near Sintaluta were closed due to flooding damage.

By June 21, Estevan had recorded 324 mm (12.8 in) of rain since May 1, making it the wettest two-month May–June period on record, while the average annual rainfall in Estevan is 333 mm (13.1 in). Water was released from two area dams to ease the pressure on the local reservoirs. At the start of summer, the flood crest moved downstream into the United States.

=== North Dakota ===
Forecasters and hydrologists anticipated a full dike breach on the Souris by June 25 or 26 after the river began overtopping it on June 22. Close to 12,000 residents were evacuated from their homes.

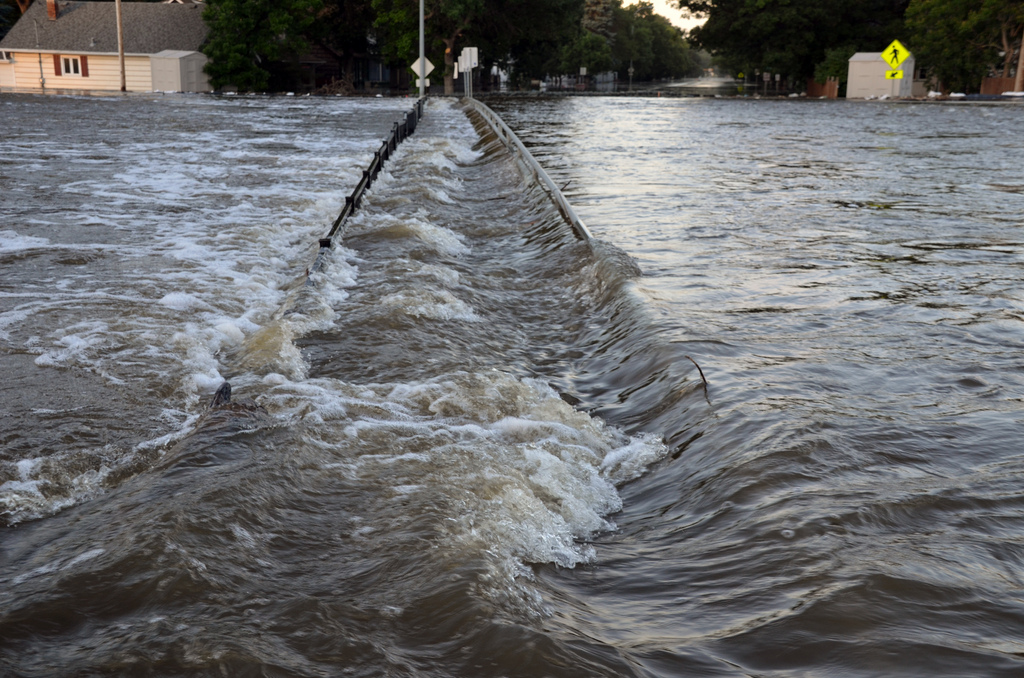
Water going on top the 3rd Avenue bridge in Minot

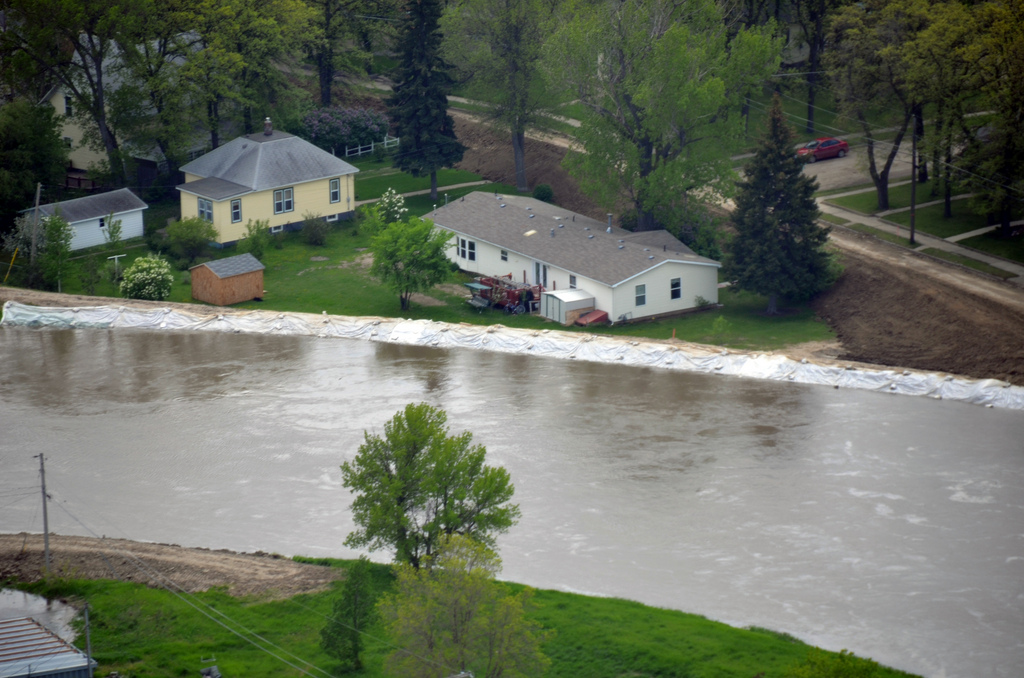
The Souris River just before rising over the temporary levees

The flood was expected to exceed the 1969 levels, while residents seek relief in evacuation shelters nearby.

On June 24, the Souris River exceeded record flood levels at Minot. By June 26, all hydrographs on the Souris from the North Dakota side had recorded record-breaking flood levels, with the exception of Lake Darling, which was less than 0.2 ft (6 cm) from record stage.

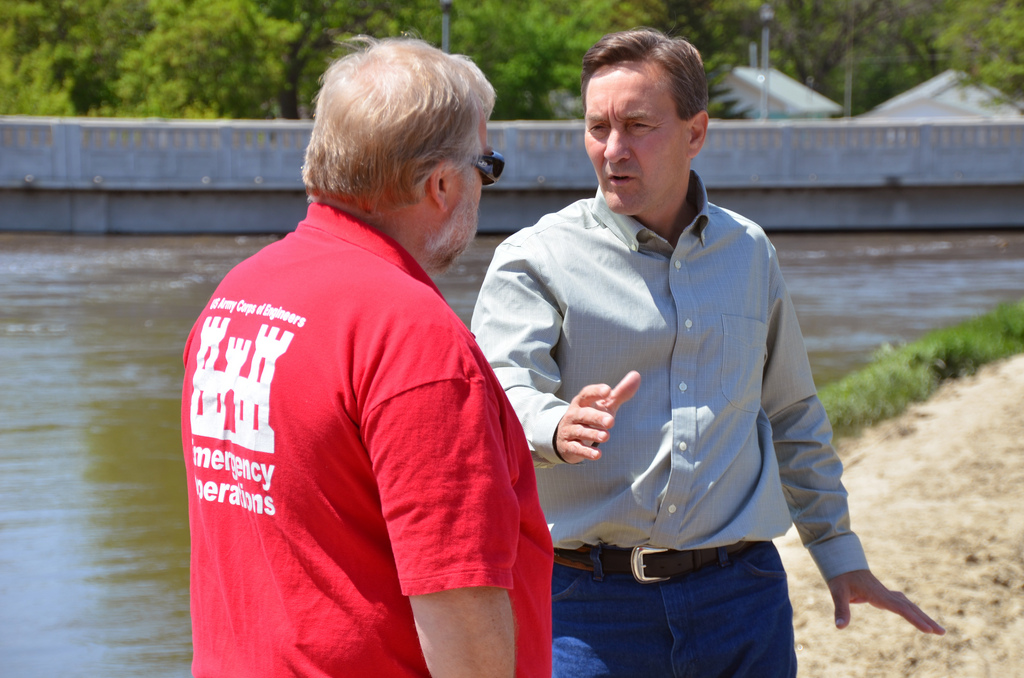
Congressman Rick Berg talks with Roland Hamborg, U.S. Army Corps of Engineers, June 4 in Minot

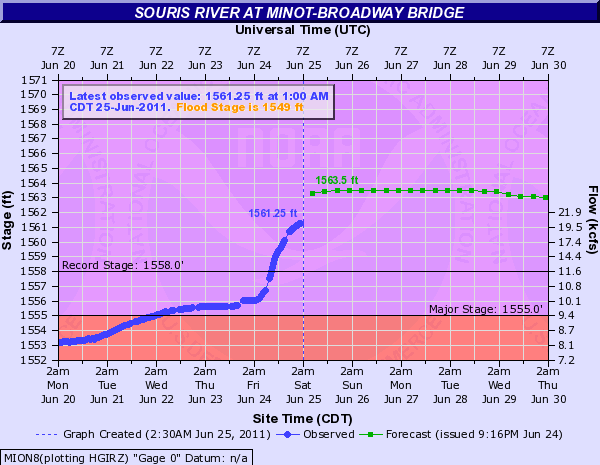
Hydrograph of observed and predicted river levels for the Souris River at Minot at 2 AM CDT on June 25, 2011.

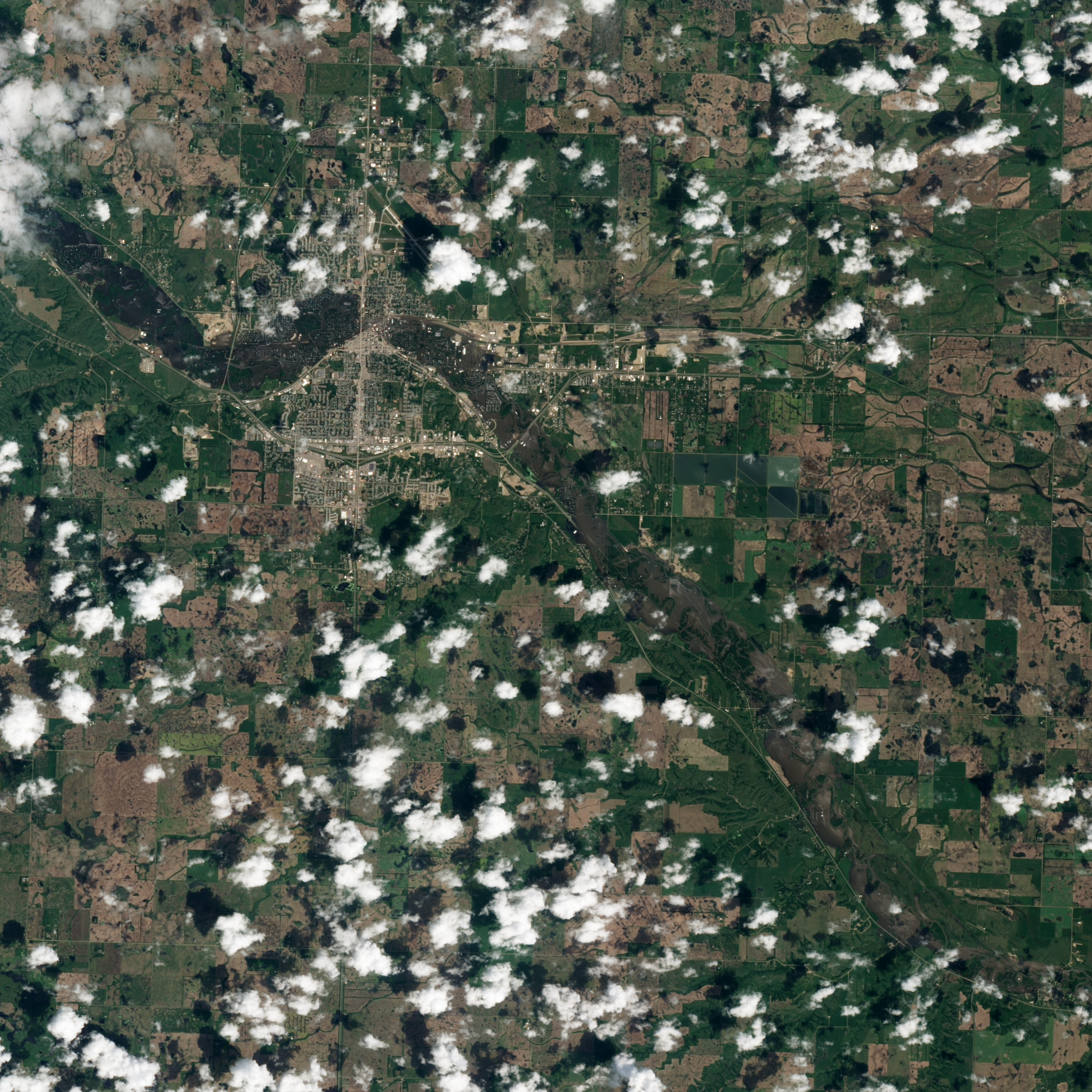
Natural-colour satellite image of Minot taken just as the River Souris reached its historic crest.

=== Manitoba ===
Manitoba officials began preparing for the third time in 2011 for Souris flooding in late June as communities were expecting record flooding, after already experiencing flooding on the Red River and the Assiniboine River, which amounted to a 300-year flood. Also lake levels at Lake Manitoba will continue to be high or may even rise more due to the high flows on the Souris River that flows into the Assiniboine east of Brandon near Treesbank. The province has stated that the flood protection and the Portage Diversion will be pushed to their limits again.

At least 85 families were evacuated from Souris, Manitoba by June 27. On July 2, the army from CFB Shilo was sent in to help with the sandbagging and building up of dykes. The river crested at Melita on July 4, at Souris on July 5 and Wawanesa on July 6. With dry weather the peak levels were a little lower than forecast and the dikes held. See the record from Manitoba Water Stewardship's daily flood report for July 7.

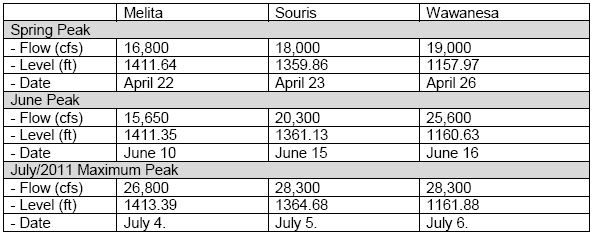
Souris River Peaks

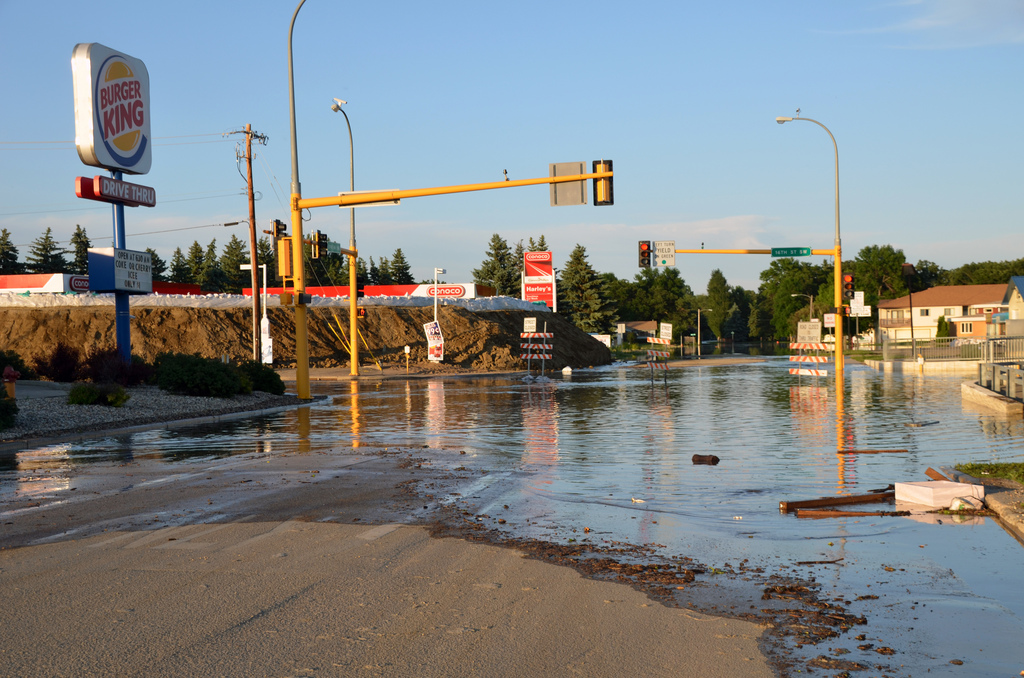
Shortly after water overtopped levees in Minot. Also, dikes protecting infrastructure.

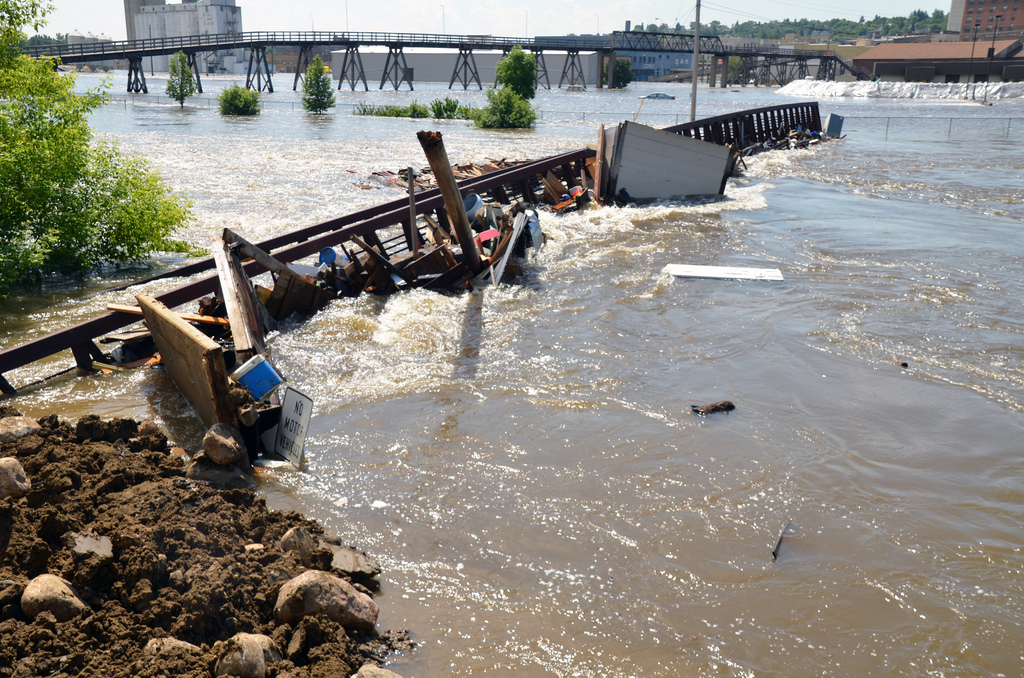
Debris piled up on the Victoria Bridge in Minot

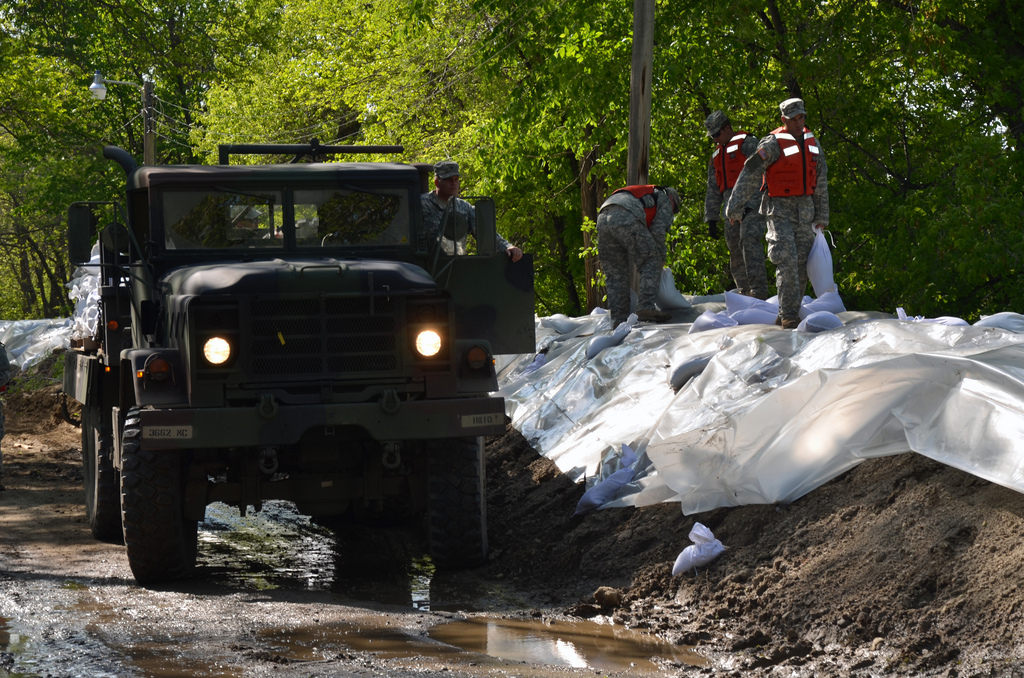
North Dakota National Guard soldiers place poly over temporary emergency levee on June 2, 2011.

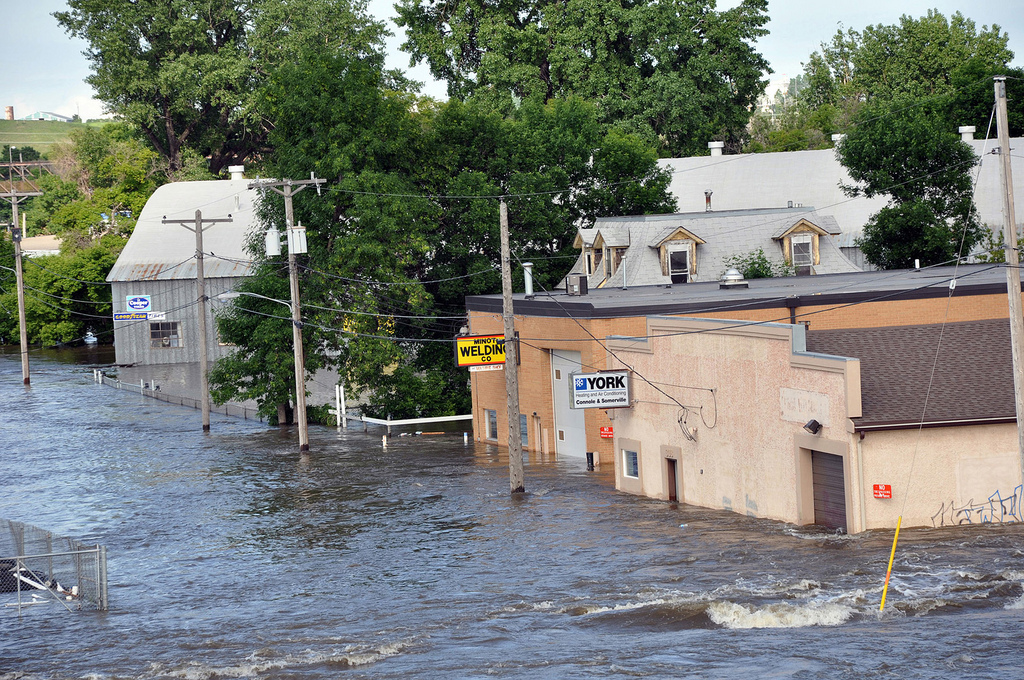
Minot, June 24

== See also ==
- 2011 Mississippi River flood
- 2011 Missouri River floods
- 2011 Assiniboine River flood
- 2011 Red River flood
