= Portage Diversion =

Spillway in Manitoba, Canada

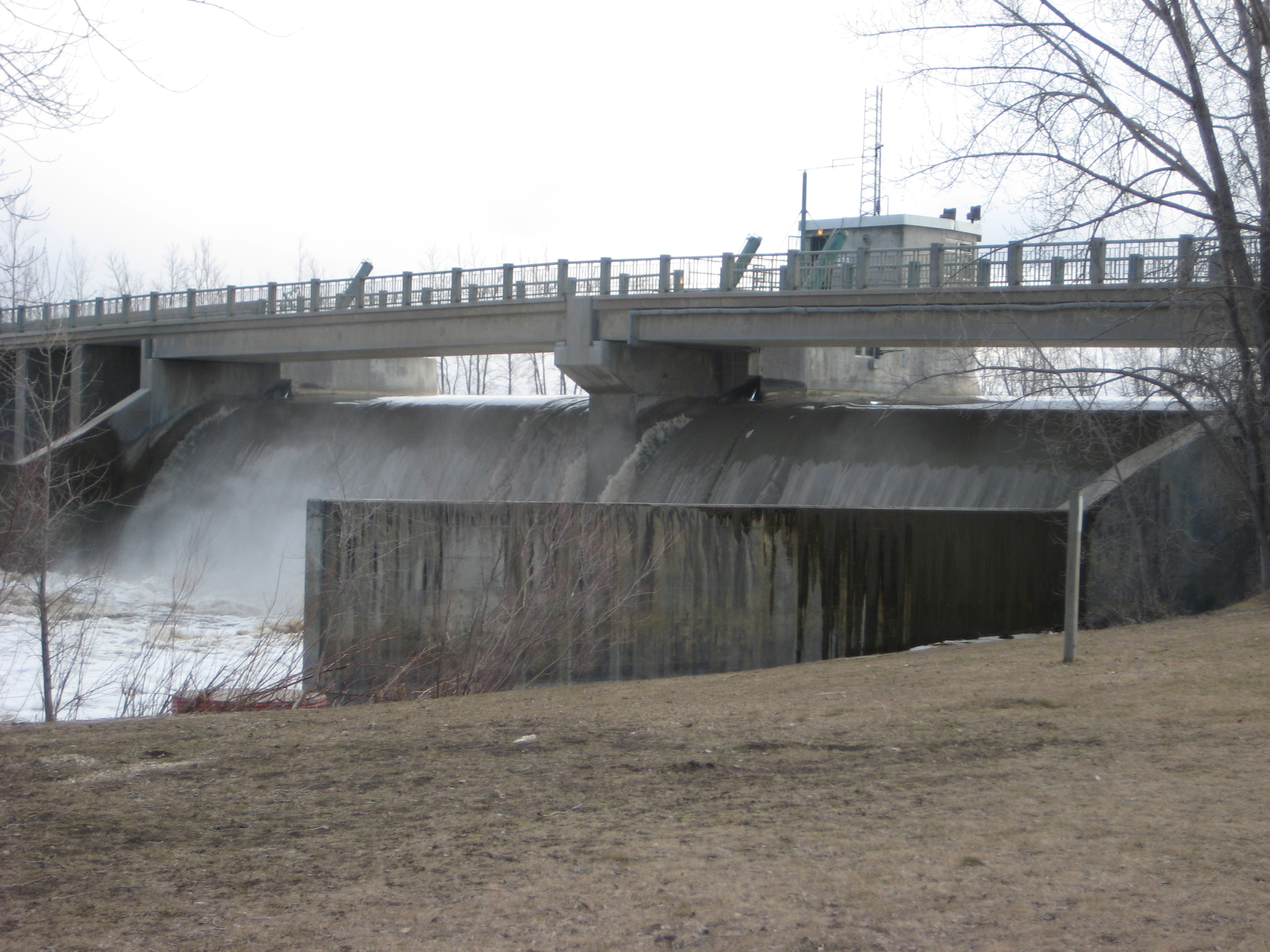
Portage Spillway sending water down the Assiniboine River towards Winnipeg

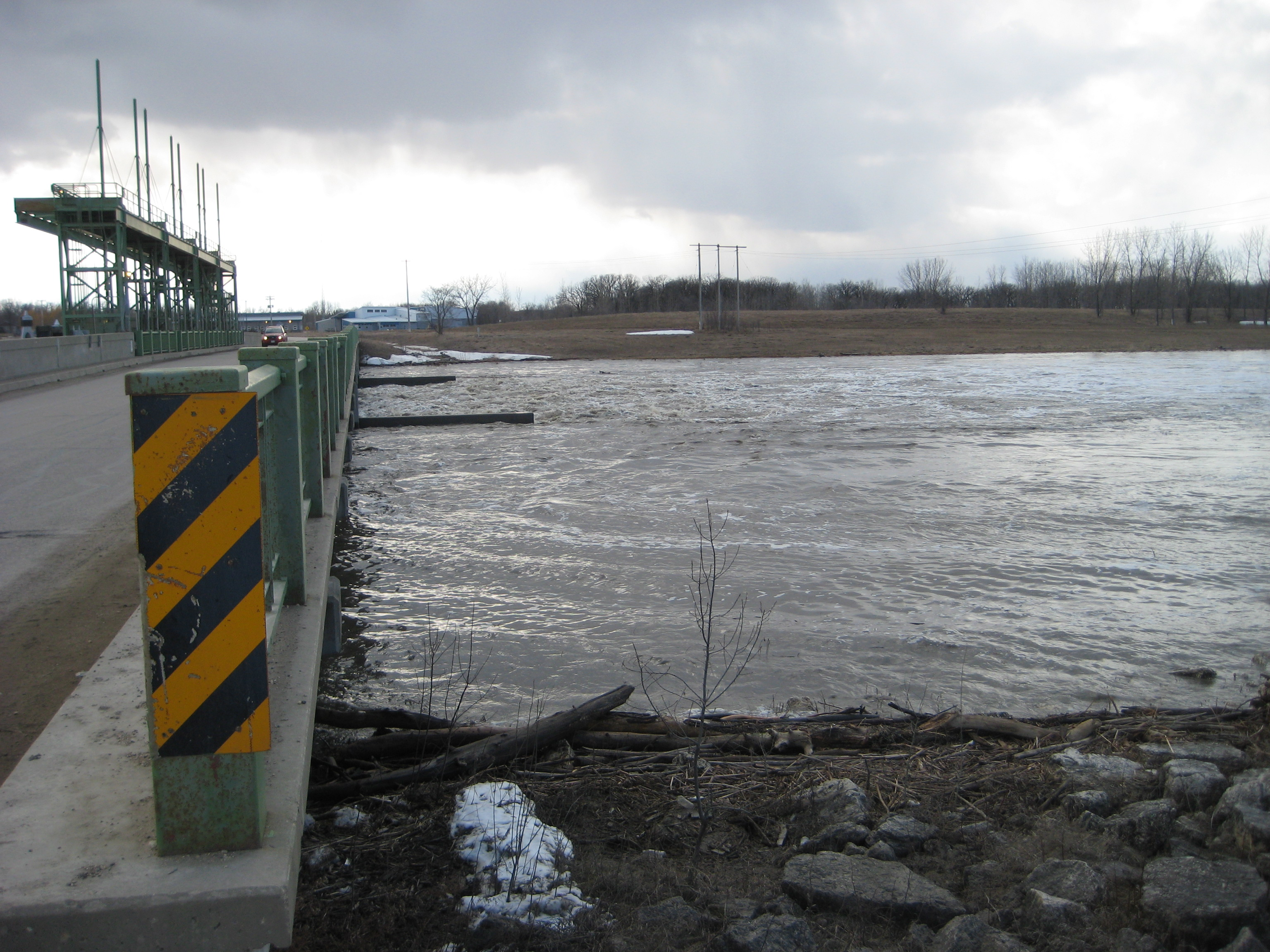
Portage Diversion operating at about maximum designed channel capacity (25,000 cu ft/s (710 m^{3}/s)) heading towards Lake Manitoba

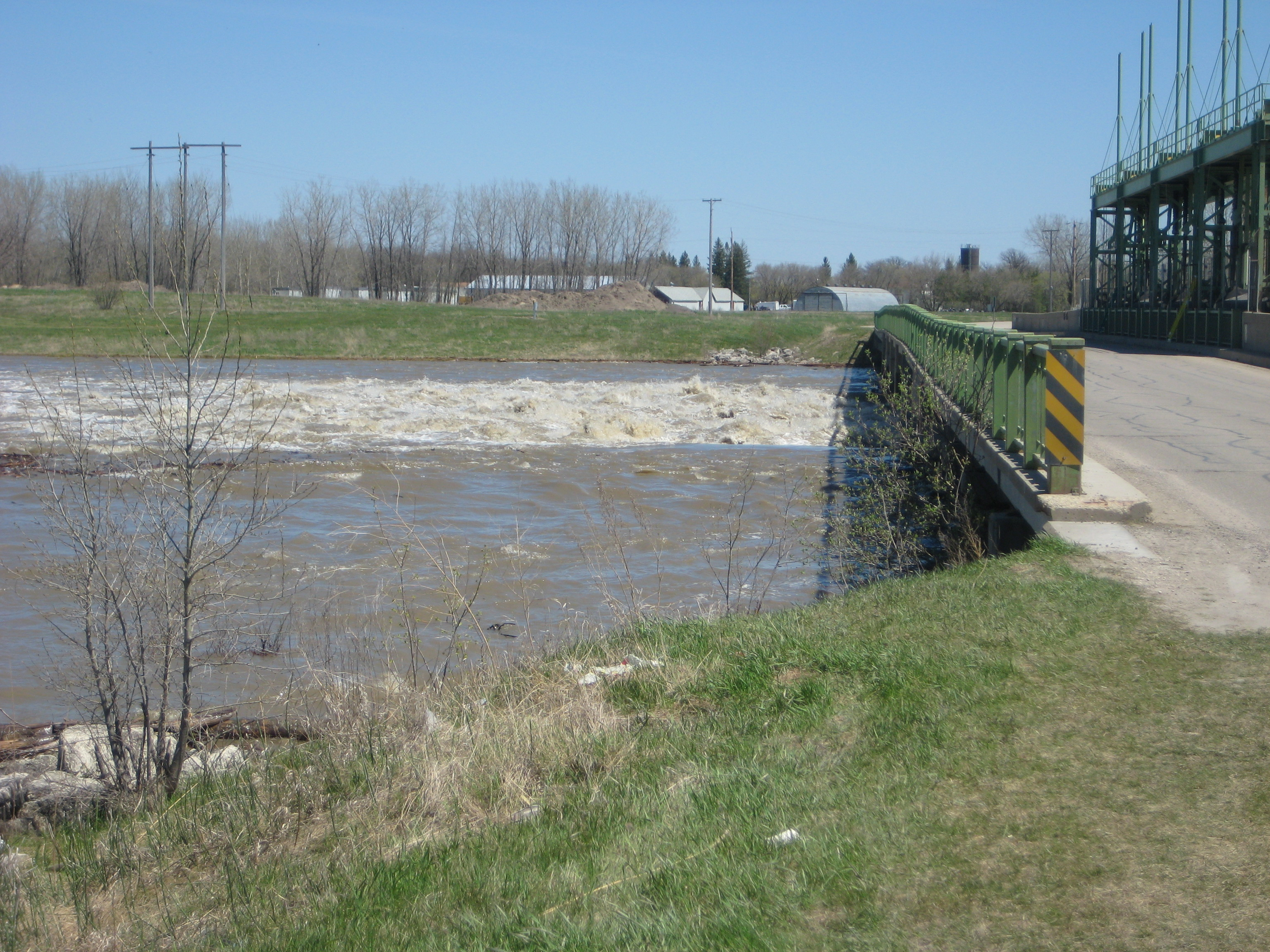
Portage Diversion operating at expanded capacity at about 33,000 cu ft/s (930 m^{3}/s) heading towards Lake Manitoba

The Portage Diversion (also known as the Assiniboine River Floodway) is a water control structure on the Assiniboine River near Portage la Prairie, Manitoba, Canada (49°56′48″N 98°20′06″W). The project was made as part of a larger attempt to prevent flooding in the Red River Valley. The Portage Diversion consists of two separate gates which divert some of the flow of water in the Assiniboine River to a 29 km long diversion channel that empties into Lake Manitoba near Delta Beach. This helps prevent flooding on the Assiniboine down river from the diversion, including in Winnipeg, where the Assiniboine River meets the Red River.

During flood years such as the 2011 Assiniboine River flood, inlet flows to the Portage Diversion control structure were measured at over 54,000 cu ft/s (1,500 m^{3}/s). This amount of water would have disastrous effects if left to flood southern Manitoba. During the flood of spring 2011, the Portage Diversion handled roughly half the flow of Niagara Falls.

The Assiniboine River and diking system can handle flows up to approx 10,000 cubic feet per second (280 m^{3}/s) without a serious breach. However, many properties between Portage la Prairie and Winnipeg are flooded once the flows exceed 10,500 cfs, including commercial establishments such as the KOA campground in St Francois Xavier. Over the past few years as high river flows have occurred east of Portage la Prairie, residents have noted significant bank erosion and stands of trees decades old are dying off. In recent years government policy has allowed 12,000 + cfs down the lower Assiniboine towards Winnipeg causing major property and environmental damage.

The diversion was originally designed to carry a volume of 25,000 cubic feet per second (710 m^{3}/s). Under a state of emergency in early May 2011, Manitoba authorities did extensive work by raising the dikes and were preparing to send up to 34,000 cu ft/s (960 m^{3}/s) down the diversion channel with bridges downstream being the determining factor in flow rate.,

The diversion was built at a cost of $20.5 million in 1970. The diversion control dam is 35 feet (11 m) high and 1,400 feet (430 m) long and allows 14,600 acre-foot (18,000,000 m^{3}) storage.

== Flow Rates ==
Below are data from years of operation of the Portage Diversion when its use resulted in a 0.5 foot or more rise in Lake Manitoba:

Year	Peak Flow (cfs)	Volume Diverted (acre-feet)
2011	34,804	4,770,000
2014	34,100	2,244,000
1976	26,000	1,420,460
2017	24,700	> 1,000,000
1995	13,800	1,120,000
2009	22,088	932,000
1999	10,500	914,000

== See also ==
- Red River Floodway
- Shellmouth Reservoir
