= 2011 Red River flood =

2011 flood affecting Canada and the US

Coordinates: 48.9°N 97.2°W

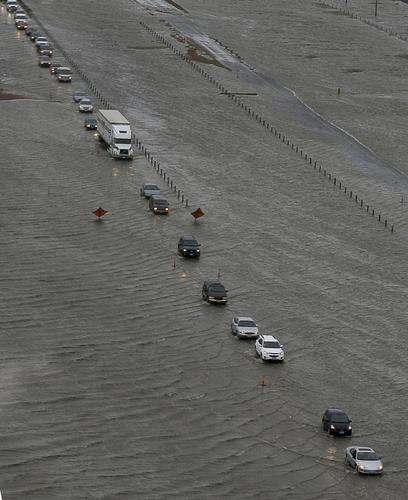
- Flood waters covering Interstate 29 near Fargo, North Dakota
- Date: April 2011 – June 2011
- Location: North Dakota, Minnesota, Manitoba
- Deaths: 4
- Property damage: Unknown

The 2011 Red River flood took place along the Red River of the North in Manitoba in Canada and North Dakota and Minnesota in the United States. Flooding began in April 2011 and lasted through June of that year. The flood was due in part to high moisture levels in the soil from rain and snowmelt in the previous year, which meant that further moisture accumulation resulted in river levels threatening the flood-prone region.

Flood predictors in Winnipeg initially worried that a dual crest of both the Assiniboine River and the Red might crest in the city at the same time. Beginning around April 8, 50 Manitoba homes were evacuated and two more were flooded after an ice jam in St. Andrews, Manitoba caused the river to flood over its banks.

Through most of Southern Manitoba, the Red River crest level was below major floods of the past, including those of 1979 and 1950. When the river crested at the James Avenue pumping station in Winnipeg, north of the confluence of the Red and Assiniboine rivers, the measured open-water crest was 19.59 above datum. This high crest at the pumping station was attributed largely to flooding of the Assiniboine River.

By April 8, three fatalities in the United States were blamed on the Red River flood.

== Assiniboine flood ==
The Assiniboine River at Brandon, Manitoba reached its highest-ever recorded level. The 2011 Assiniboine River Flood was a 300-year flood, meaning a flood with its magnitude has (on average) a roughly 0.3% chance of occurring in a given year. 2011 flood levels on the Red River were below those of 2009.

Officials said that if the flood controls had not been constructed along the Red and Assiniboine Rivers near Winnipeg in the 1960s and later, the cresting water level would have amounted to the sixth-highest water levels ever recorded in the city. Higher levels were recorded in 1861, 2009, 1997, 1852, and 1826 (in descending order of highest level).

== Fatalities in US and Manitoba, Canada ==
Three fatalities in the United States were blamed on the flood by April 8. One man died while sandbagging in Fargo-Moorhead. The other two American men drowned in the Maple River when their boat capsized while they were hunting beavers. A Canadian man died in Niverville, Manitoba on April 9; his vehicle skidded off a flooded road and submerged before he could escape.
