= 2011 Assiniboine River flood =

Coordinates: 49.6°N 99.5°W

- Date: April 2011 – June 2011
- Location: Westman Region
- Deaths: 1
- Property damage: >$1 billion

The 2011 Assiniboine River flood was caused by above average precipitation in the Westman Region in Manitoba and Saskatchewan. It was the most serious flood in three centuries that affected much of the region. The flooding at the Assiniboine River was expected to mostly involve the 2011 Red River Flood but instead the more severe flooding was found on the Assiniboine in the west.

== Early signs ==
The 2011 flood first began in the fall of 2010 with several major rainfall events and generally wet conditions. Initially, it was predicted that the flood along the Assiniboine River would be similar to the flood of 1995. During the winter of 2010–2011 the Shellmouth Reservoir was emptied in preparation, to store water for the coming spring flood. With more and more precipitation, the estimates on the flood were revised upwards.

The first major settlement to experience the floodwater was St. Lazare, Manitoba which was located near the confluence of the Assiniboine River and Qu'Appelle River. Dikes were built up to protect against the rising floodwater, but unfortunately some residences were not spared as their protective dikes were overwhelmed. The flood continued downstream, spilling over its banks and flooding campgrounds and fields in the flood plain. Brandon, Manitoba's second largest city, prepared well in advance of the anticipated flood, building up both earthen dikes as well as sandbag/Hesco bastion dikes. After a heavy snowfall on April 29 and 30 over much of the Assiniboine River watershed, the crest forecast for Brandon was revised upward well above the flood of 1976. The river peaked at about 36,700 cu ft/s (1,040 m^{3}/s),60% higher than the previous highest recorded peak of 23,000 cu ft/s (650 m^{3}/s) in 1923. The 2011 event is estimated to be a 1 in 300-year flood.

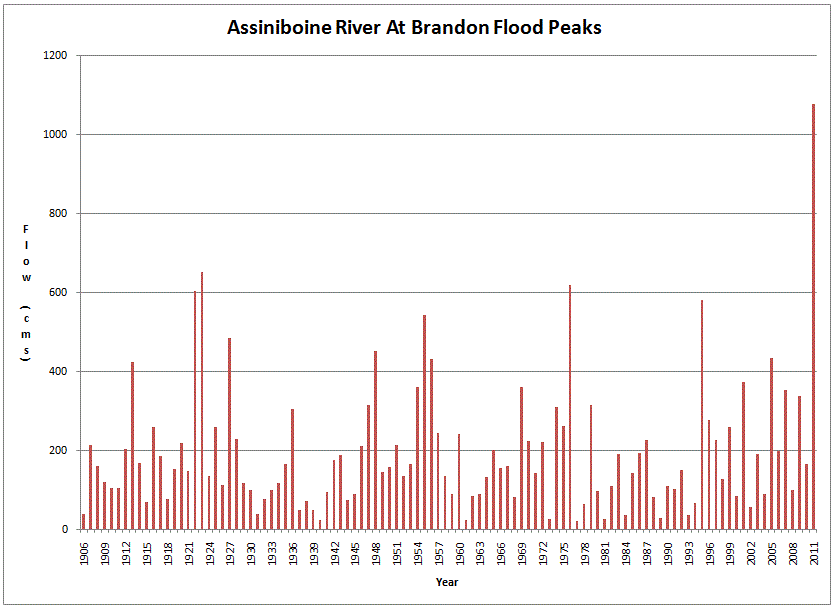
Assiniboine River at Brandon Peaks

Shortly thereafter, a state of emergency was declared in Brandon as well as other municipalities across Manitoba. Premier Greg Selinger requested from Prime Minister Stephen Harper troops from the Canadian military to help with the flood fighting efforts. The last time the military was called in to help fight a flood in Manitoba was the 1997 Red River flood.

Downstream of Brandon, the Manitoba Government forecast that between 54000-56000 cu ft/s of water would enter into the Portage Diversion reservoir near Portage la Prairie. The capacity for the Portage Diversion channel, which drains into Lake Manitoba, is only approximately 25,000 cu ft/s (710 m^{3}/s), which would mean that between 29000-31000 cu ft/s of water would flow toward communities such as Poplar Point, St. Francois Xavier, and Headingley, before joining with the Red River at The Forks. This amount of water would overwhelm the dikes downstream, along the Assiniboine River, which were only built to allow for a channel capacity of about 19,000 cu ft/s before spilling over. Otherwise breaching of dikes would occur.

On June 22, 2011, the city of Minot, North Dakota issued an evacuation of 12,000 residents due to the swollen Souris River that flowed through the city. The Souris River starts in Saskatchewan and makes its way south across the border and then back north into Manitoba. The Souris River then eventually joins up with the Assiniboine River past Brandon which could again raise water levels on the Assiniboine due to the swollen Souris and the possibility of Lake Manitoba raising up again. Preparations are under way for the communities along the Souris to raise dikes and evacuations have begun. The province has said it will push the limits of the flood protection again.

== Intentional breach and flooding ==
It was determined by the Manitoba government that the capacity could be increased to 32000-34000 cu ft/s by building up the banks of the Portage Diversion, depending on hydraulic resistance on bridges along the channel. This would reduce the flows on the Assiniboine River somewhat, but still not enough for the dikes to hold. It was also determined that a controlled release of water from the Assiniboine in the range of 2000–6000 cu ft/s should be created downstream of the Portage Diversion in order to reduce flows on the river, and divert the water into the La Salle River watershed, resulting in more manageable river levels along the Assiniboine River. The exact location decided on was at the Hoop and Holler Bend.

The controlled breach of the dike was estimated to flood approximately 225 square kilometres (87 sq mi). This option was chosen as opposed to risking an uncontrolled breach, which could release as much as 500 square kilometres (190 sq mi) with flows of up to 15,000 cu ft/s (420 m^{3}/s), while over 800 homes would be affected by the waters. Military personnel were assigned to build flood protection in Brandon, on the Assiniboine River west of Portage la Prairie, and for residences that were at risk of flooding due to the controlled breach.

The intentional breach and overland flooding began on Saturday May, 14. The resultant flooding was very slow moving and was expected to take several days to reach the La Salle River. The waters intentionally spilled from the Assiniboine were expected to cover 185 square kilometres (71 sq mi) and flood a possible 150 homes. The Expected crest at the Portage Reservoir was then downgraded to around 52,000 cu ft/s (1,500 m^{3}/s), leading some engineers to question the necessity of the breach at Hoop & Holler Bend as between the Portage Diversion (34,000 cu ft/s (960 m^{3}/s)) and the Assiniboine River Channel (up to 20,000 cu ft/s (570 m^{3}/s)) could have handled the floodwater. The controlled breach has carried no more than 400 cu ft/s (11 m^{3}/s) and flooding was modest.

== Effects on Lake Manitoba ==
With the diversion of water from the Assiniboine using the Portage Diversion into Lake Manitoba, the water level on the lake increased. Increasing the capacity of the Diversion put surrounding residences in danger of being flooded, also prompting an evacuation of Delta Beach on Lake Manitoba. Due to the increased capacity of the diversion and the duration of its use, it increased water levels on Lake Manitoba significantly, more than the 1976 Assiniboine River Flood, which resulted in approximately 1,420,000 acre-feet (1.75 km^{3}) of water being diverted. In 2011 a total of 4,768,000 acre-feet (5.881 km^{3}) was diverted into the lake. The Manitoba Government's projections indicated that excluding the outflows of Lake Manitoba through the Fairford River resulted in an increase of 1.22 feet (0.37 m) in the level of the lake. The Flood of 2011 surpassed these totals, causing flooding to Lake Manitoba and peaked at 817.2 feet (249.1 m) above sea level, 5 feet (1.5 m) above the normal operating range. This led to flood fighting efforts shifting from the Assiniboine River to Lake Manitoba. A technical review of the 2011 flood completed in October, 2013 concluded that the net effect of artificial works (Fairford River improvements and the Portage Diversion) was a rise of 0.3 feet (0.091 m) on the lake. However, the rise occurred in weeks, rather than years as would occur in natural conditions.
