= Lacombe, Louisiana =

- Census-designated place
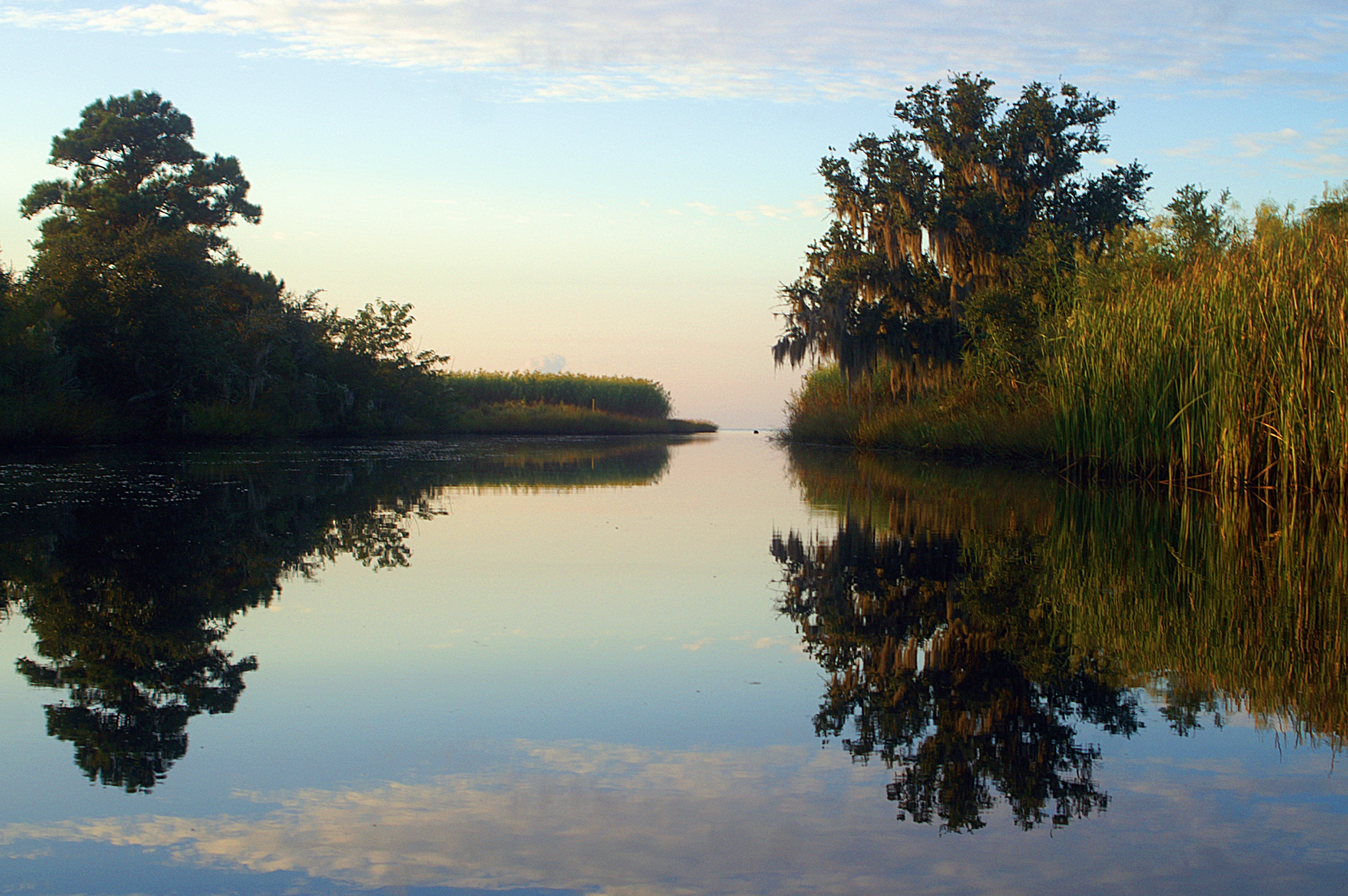
- Cane Bayou

- Location of Lacombe in Louisiana
- Coordinates: 30°18′54″N 89°55′53″W
- Country: United States
- State: Louisiana
- Parish: St. Tammany

Area
  - Total: 27.51 sq mi (71.25 km^{2})
  - Land: 26.45 sq mi (68.50 km^{2})
  - Water: 1.06 sq mi (2.75 km^{2})
- Elevation: 13 ft (4.0 m)

Population (2020)
  - Total: 8,657
  - Density: 327.3/sq mi (126.38/km^{2})
- Time zone: UTC-6 (CST)
  - Summer (DST): UTC-5 (CDT)
- Area code: 985
- FIPS code: 22-40665

Lacombe is a census-designated place (CDP) in St. Tammany Parish, Louisiana, United States. The population was 8,679 at the 2010 census, and 8,657 in 2020.

== Geography ==
Lacombe is located at 30°18′54″N 89°55′53″W (30.314863, -89.931462). According to the United States Census Bureau, the CDP has a total area of 27.5 square miles (71.2 km^{2}), of which 26.4 square miles (68.5 km^{2}) is land and 1.0 square mile (2.7 km^{2}), or 3.86%, is water.

== Demographics ==
Historical population
Census	Pop.	Note	%±
1990	6,523		—
2000	7,518		15.3%
2010	8,679		15.4%
2020	8,657		−0.3%
U.S. Decennial Census; 1950 1960 1970 1980; 1990 2000 2010

Lacombe first appeared as a census designated place the 1990 U.S. census.

Lacombe racial composition as of 2020
	Number	Percentage
White (non-Hispanic)	5,483	63.34%
Black or African American (non-Hispanic)	1,755	20.27%
Native American	54	0.62%
Asian	47	0.54%
Pacific Islander	2	0.02%
Other/Mixed	671	7.75%
Hispanic or Latino	645	7.45%

As of the 2020 United States census, there were 8,657 people, 3,456 households, and 2,260 families residing in the CDP.

== Education ==
Lacombe is within the St. Tammany Parish Public Schools district.

Schools that serve most of Lacombe include:

- Chahta-Ima Elementary School
- Bayou Lacombe Middle School
- Monteleone Junior High School
- Lakeshore High School - St. Tammany Parish's newest high school, opened August 2009

Schools that serve small sections of Lacombe:

- Woodlake Elementary School in Mandeville serves a small portion of western Lacombe
- Mandeville Middle School near Mandeville serves a small portion of western Lacombe
- Slidell Junior High School in Slidell serves a small portion of eastern Lacombe
- Slidell High School in Slidell serves a small portion of eastern Lacombe

Previously Fontainebleau High School served much of Lacombe. Previously Mandeville High School served Lacombe.

St. Tammany Parish Library operates the Lacombe Branch.

The main campus of Northshore Technical Community College is in Lacombe. This campus was established in January 2017. St. Tammany Parish is within the service areas of two community colleges: NTCC, and Delgado Community College.

== Notable people ==
- Pete Schneider, former member of the Louisiana House of Representatives and Lacombe resident
- Adrien Rouquette, (born in Louisiana in 1813, of French parentage; died in 1887) was a writer and a Catholic missionary among the Choctaw Native Americans.
