= Slidell High School (Louisiana) =

Location
- 1 Tiger Drive; Slidell, Louisiana 70458-2046; United States
- 30.286137°N 89.772726°W

Information
- Type: Public
- Motto: Truth Shines a Guiding Light
- Established: 1908
- School district: St. Tammany Parish Public Schools
- Principal: George Herdliska
- Staff: 124.45 (FTE)
- Faculty: 114
- Grades: 9–12
- Student to teacher ratio: 14.73
- Colors: Kelly green and white
- Athletics: Football, basketball, baseball, softball, track & field, soccer, volleyball, golf, swimming, tennis, power lifting, cross country, bowling
- Athletics conference: LHSAA District 6-5A
- Mascot: Bengal tiger
- Nickname: Tigers
- Rival: Salmen High School Northshore High School
- Extracurriculars: Cheerleading, band, robotics, flag team, Swingerettes (dance team), NJROTC, clubs
- Website: Slidell High School

Slidell High School is a public school for grades nine through twelve located in Slidell, Louisiana, United States. It is part of the St. Tammany Parish Public School District and serves portions of west and central Slidell as well as a section of Lacombe.

== Athletics ==
Slidell High athletics competes in the LHSAA.

== Notable alumni ==
- Brett Bech, former NFL player
- Reggie Cooper, former NFL player
- Matt Forte, former NFL running back for the Chicago Bears and New York Jets
- Will Harris, current MLB player (Houston Astros)
- Xavier Paul, Major League Baseball outfielder who currently plays for the Cincinnati Reds
- J. Kevin Pearson (1977), Louisiana state representative, 2007–2019, District 76
