= Joseph Bulovas =

American football player (born 1999)

No. 97, 36
- Position: Kicker

Personal information
- Born: January 9, 1999 (age 27)
- Listed height: 6 ft 0 in (1.83 m)
- Listed weight: 215 lb (98 kg)

Career information
- High school: Mandeville High School (Mandeville, Louisiana)
- College: Alabama (2017–2020); Vanderbilt (2021–2022)

Awards and highlights
- 2× CFP national champion (2017, 2020)

Joseph Bulovas (born January 9, 1999) is an American football placekicker. He played for the Alabama Crimson Tide where he was a part of two College Football Playoff national championship teams. He also played for the Vanderbilt Commodores.

== Early life ==
Bulovas was born on 9 January 1999. He served as the placekicker for Mandeville High School in Mandeville, Louisiana. He played for the East in the U.S. Army All-American Bowl, earning nine out of the East's 27 points in its 27-17 win. As a sophomore, he kicked a career-long field goal of 52 yards. Overall, Bulovas scored 101 kicking points: 68-of-76 PATs and 11-of-25 field goals.

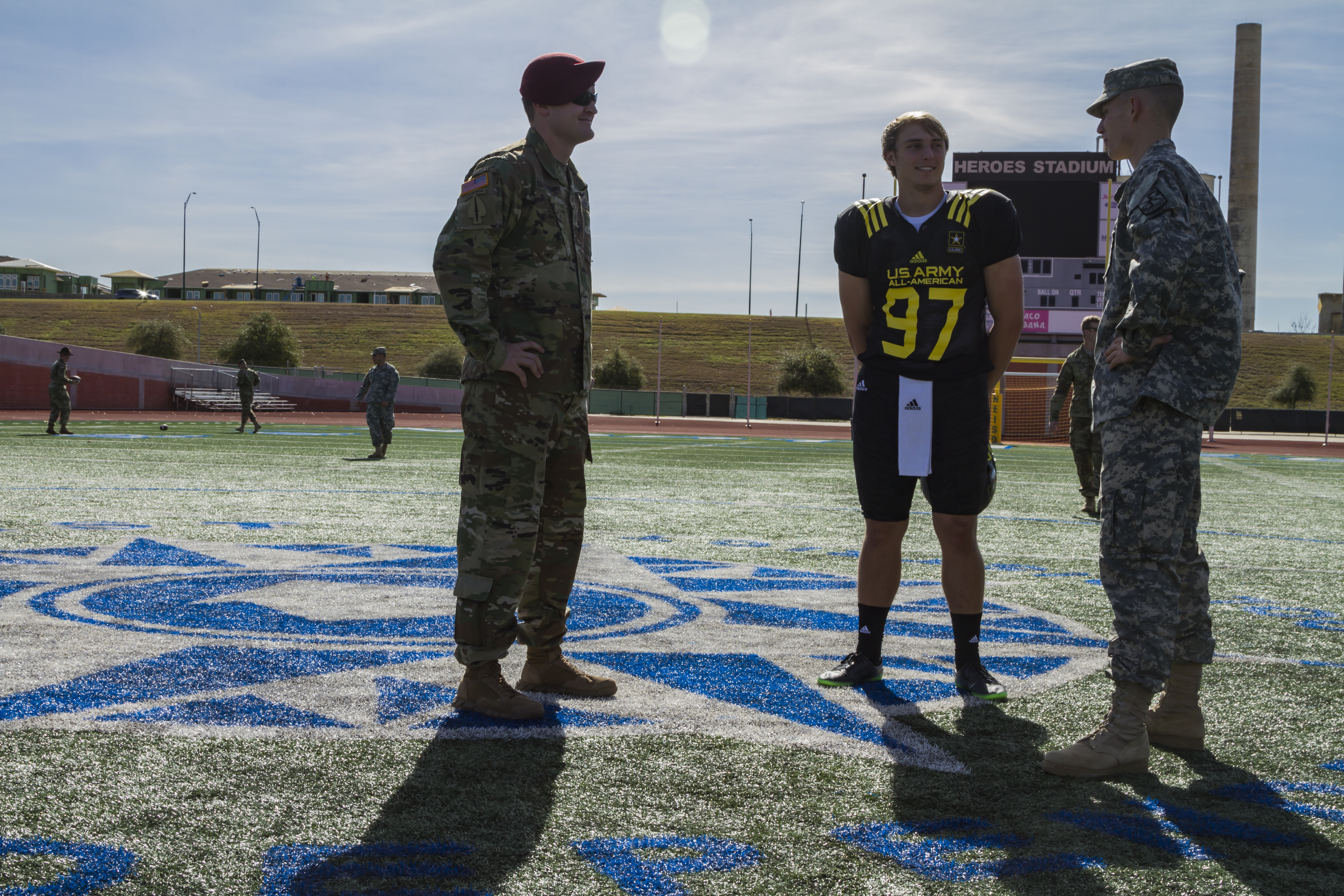
Bulovas at the U.S. Army All-American Bowl.

Bulovas was a three-star recruit and received offers from Army, Mississippi State, Alabama, Georgia Tech, Air Force, Tulane, Louisiana, Southeastern Louisiana, and UTSA. He originally committed to Georgia Tech on January 10, 2016, but decommitted more than a year later on January 23, 2017. On January 25, 2017, two days later, he committed to Alabama.

== Career ==
=== Alabama ===
Bulovas was redshirted in 2017 as Alabama won its 17th national championship against Georgia, 26–23.

As a redshirt freshman in 2018, Bulovas assumed the kickoff duties and played 15 games as the placekicker. He made 14-of-18 field goal attempts with a long of 49 yards against Mississippi State. He also made 75 PATs. He produced a total of 117 points.

As a sophomore in 2019, Bulovas played in 11 games and started nine. He made 8-of-11 field goals with a long of 43 yards and also made 59 PATs, producing a total of 83 points. In their last game of the year against Auburn, Bulovas had an opportunity to tie the game with a 30-yard field goal attempt with 2:04 left on the clock. He hit it off of the upright and Alabama lost 48–45. As they entered the game ranked #5 in the country, the loss ended their playoff hopes. Bulovas apologized on Twitter after the game. "I just want to express my apologies to the Crimson Tide nation... that is a kick I should make in my sleep."

Bulovas did not see the field for Alabama for the following 13 games. Alabama won its 18th national championship against Ohio State by a score of 52–24. After the season, Bulovas placed his name into the transfer portal as a graduate transfer. In February 2021, he announced that he would be transferring to the Vanderbilt Commodores.

=== Vanderbilt ===
Bulovas appeared in all 12 games for the Commodores in 2021, making 14-of-19 field goals with a long of 53 yards. He was perfect in extra points making 15 out of 15. Bulovas appeared in all 12 games for the Commodores in 2022 and made seven-of-12 field goals. He was perfect on extra points making 35 out of 35.
