= Ed Tillison =

American football player (born 1969)

No. 34
- Position: Fullback

Personal information
- Born: February 12, 1969 (age 57); Pearl River, Louisiana, U. S.
- Listed height: 6 ft 0 in (1.83 m)
- Listed weight: 225 lb (102 kg)

Career information
- High school: Pearl River
- College: Northwest Missouri State (1987–1991)
- NFL draft: 1992: 11th round, 306th overall pick

Career history
- Detroit Lions (1992–1993); New Orleans Saints (1994)*
- * Offseason or practice squad member only

Awards and highlights
- 2× First-team All-MIAA (1989–1990); Second-team All-MIAA (1991)

Career NFL statistics
- Games played: 6
- Rushing yards: 22
- Return yards: 27
- Stats at Pro Football Reference

Edward L. Tillison (born February 12, 1969) is an American former professional football fullback who played in the National Football League (NFL) with the Detroit Lions. He played college football for the Northwest Missouri State Bearcats.

== Early life ==
Tillison was born on February 12, 1969, Pearl River, Louisiana and attended Pearl River High School.

== College career ==
Tillison played college football for the Northwest Missouri State Bearcats from 1987 to 1991. As a freshman, he had 630 rushing yards and five touchdowns. Tillison suffered a broken foot in practice before the 1988 season and redshirted. In 1989, he rushed for 1,219 yards and eight touchdowns, earning first-team All-Mid-America Intercollegiate Athletics Association honors.

The following season, Tillison was again named to the first-team All-MIAA team after he logged 913 rushing yards and six touchdowns. As a senior, Tillison rushed for 701 yards and scored five times. He was selected to the second-team All-MIAA team and left Northwest Missouri State as the career rushing yards leader. In 2002, he was inducted into the school's athletic hall of fame.

== Professional career ==
=== Detroit Lions ===
Tillison was selected in the 11th round, with the 306th overall selection, by the Detroit Lions in the 1992 NFL draft. On August 31, he was released and signed to the practice squad the following day. On September 9, Tillison was elevated to the active roster. He played in two games before he was placed on the injured reserve for a shoulder injury. On December 2, Tillison was activated off the injured reserve. In the last four games of the season, he rushed for 22 yards and returned kickoff for 27 yards. On August 23, 1993, Tillison was placed on the Reserve/PUP list. On February 17, 1994, he became a free agent.

=== New Orleans Saints ===
On April 28, 1994, Tillison was signed by the New Orleans Saints. On July 15, he was waived by the team.
