= Fontainebleau High School =

Location
- 100 Bulldog Drive; Suburban; Mandeville, Louisiana 70471; United States; 30.4072°N 90.0375°W

Information
- Type: Public
- Motto: Optimus Optimorum (The Best of the Best)
- Founded: 1994
- School district: St. Tammany Parish Public Schools
- Principal: Brian Hirstius
- Employees: 189
- Grades: 9–12
- Enrollment: 1,619 (2023–2024)
- Student to teacher ratio: 14.51
- Colors: Red and black
- Athletics: Baseball, Boys' Basketball, Boys' Soccer, Boys' Track, Cross Country, Football, Girls' Basketball, Girls' Soccer, Girls' Track, Golf, Power Lifting, Softball, Swimming, Tennis, Volleyball, Wrestling
- Mascot: Bulldog
- Nickname: Bulldogs
- Rival: Mandeville High School, Covington High School, Lakeshore High School, St. Paul's School
- Website: fontainebleauhigh.stpsb.org

Fontainebleau High School is a public high school located in unincorporated St. Tammany Parish, Louisiana, United States, north of Mandeville. The school is a part of the St. Tammany Parish Public Schools.

The school serves Abita Springs, Covington, and a small section of Mandeville. It previously served much of Lacombe.

== History ==
It was founded in August, 1994 with 775 ninth- and tenth-grade students. The school had an estimated enrollment of approximately 2,300 students during the 2008–2009 school year, but was downsized with the opening of the new Lakeshore High School, which was opened with the 2009–2010 school year. 2009 enrollment for Fontainebleau is estimated to be about 1,650.

Fontainebleau's mascot is Spike the Bulldog; the school's motto is Optimus Optimorum, a Latin saying meaning "The best of the best". Its school colors are red and black.

== Academics ==
Fontainebleau High School has been recognized as being among the top public high schools in the state and was listed in the 2009 "America's Best High Schools: Louisiana" article in an issue of Business Week. The school continually scores above local, state, and national averages on standardized tests. The school has continually received the Golden Achievement Award from LSU in recognition of the school's graduating seniors earning high amounts of college credit on LSU's credit/placement exams.

== PTA ==
In 2004 the school was certified as a National PTA Parent Involvement School of Excellence, and was re-certified in 2007.

== Athletics ==
- Fontainebleau, a member of District 6-5A as classified by the Louisiana High School Athletic Association (LHSAA).

=== Championships ===
- In 2011, the girls' volleyball team finished up the most successful season in Fontainebleau history (44–1) with a State Championship, defeating Mount Carmel in the finals.
- The school won the state title in girls' soccer in 2004, the first state championship the school has ever won, and was the state runner-up in 2009 and 2017. The team has also appeared frequently in the NSCAA winter soccer regional rankings and has appeared several times in the national rankings. In 2004, the championship winning year, the women's soccer team was ranked 7th in the nation.
- The FHS Bulldog Wrestling Team has finished in the top 10 in the state multiple times.

=== Alma Mater ===
O'Fontainebleau, O’Fontainebleau
Your constant beacon guides us.

You gave us love
We learned respect, honor and integrity.

As the years go by
We lean on thee to guide our steadfast course.

All hail to thee my Fontainebleau,
Forever in our hearts we will love thee.

=== Fight Song ===
Bulldogs – red and black – the crowd is fired up tonight!
Go F.H.S. let’s go! Oh, can’t you see the glow.
The great excitement makes you want to yell – GO BULLDOGS!
Go big red; we’re on attack; let’s shine; Show our Pride.
Stand up; yell Go, Fight, Win Again.
We’ll be the best until the end! Hey!

== Organizations ==
=== Band ===
The Fontainebleau Band program began with approximately 30 members when the school opened in 1994, it now boasts approximately 200 members.

In 2003, the marching band attended its first marching festival. During the 2005 season the Crimson Band was invited to the Louisiana Showcase of Marching Bands, the largest in the state despite missing a month of rehearsals due to Hurricane Katrina. In the Fall of 2006, the band placed 3rd overall at the Louisiana Showcase and 5th overall in the Fall of 2007. In 2008, the band was named the Reserve Grand Champion at the Louisiana Showcase of Marching Bands. In 2009, the band placed 3rd overall with their show, Carpe Noctum. In 2010, the band once again was named Reserve Grand Champion at Louisiana Showcase with the show City of Scandal: Love and the Mob. In 2011, October 29, the Fontainebleau Crimson Band once again won Reserve Grand Champion at the Louisiana Showcase of Marching Bands, falling short of Lafayette High School by only 2½ points. The band has also been named the Grand Champion of the Northshore Camellia Marching festival in 2007, 2008, and 2010.

The FHS Band program includes: the Marching band and Flag Team, Wind Symphony, Symphonic Band, Concert band, Indoor Percussion, Jazz Ensemble.

The FHS Band went to their first WGI regionals competition in early 2008. Color Guard took first place in the guard competition with their show "My Funny Valentine", and the percussion ensemble took second place in the percussion competition with their show "Circuitry".

=== Doghouse Design ===
Doghouse Design is a school-based enterprise (Work-based learning) branching off of Fontainebleau High School’s Graphic Arts Program. Following the rapid growth of the Graphic Arts Program, which offered its first course in 2016, Doghouse Design had its grand opening in January 2019. As a part of the Graphic Arts course curricula, Doghouse Design allows students to imagine, design, create, and market apparel for various teams, clubs, and organizations on campus. Students learn the technical skills required to operate commercial screen printing presses, embroidery machines, heat presses, and large format printers. Students are also offered the opportunity to become Adobe Certified Professionals through certification in Adobe Creative Suite titles, such as Photoshop and Illustrator.

=== JROTC ===
LA-944 is an Air Force Junior Reserve Officer Training Corps located at Fontainebleau High School, Mandeville, Louisiana. It was created in July 1994 with an agreement between Fontainebleau High School, the St. Tammany Parish School Board, and the United States Air Force. LA-944 is a cadet-run corps where the members of the Senior Staff make all of the major decisions with little help from the Instructors. LA-944 received the Distinguished Unit Award (DUA) during the 1999–2000 year and the DUA with Merit in the years 2007–2008 and 2010–2011.

=== SkillsUSA ===
The FHS chapter of SkillsUSA was founded in the Fall of 2018. That spring, three students attended the 2019 Louisiana State Leadership and Skills Conference, with two of them taking gold in their respective contests. Those two students went on to represent FHS and Louisiana at the 2019 National Leadership and Skills Conference (NLSC) in Louisville, Kentucky. FHS has maintained an active chapter ever since. In the summer of 2025, representing FHS and Louisiana at the NLSC in Atlanta, Georgia, recently graduated Leah Sanchez (2025) won national gold in Screen Printing Technology.

== Notable alumni ==
- April Nelson, actress and beauty pageant title-holder ("Miss Louisiana 2015")
- Andrew Tarbell, goalkeeper for Austin FC
