= Salmen High School =

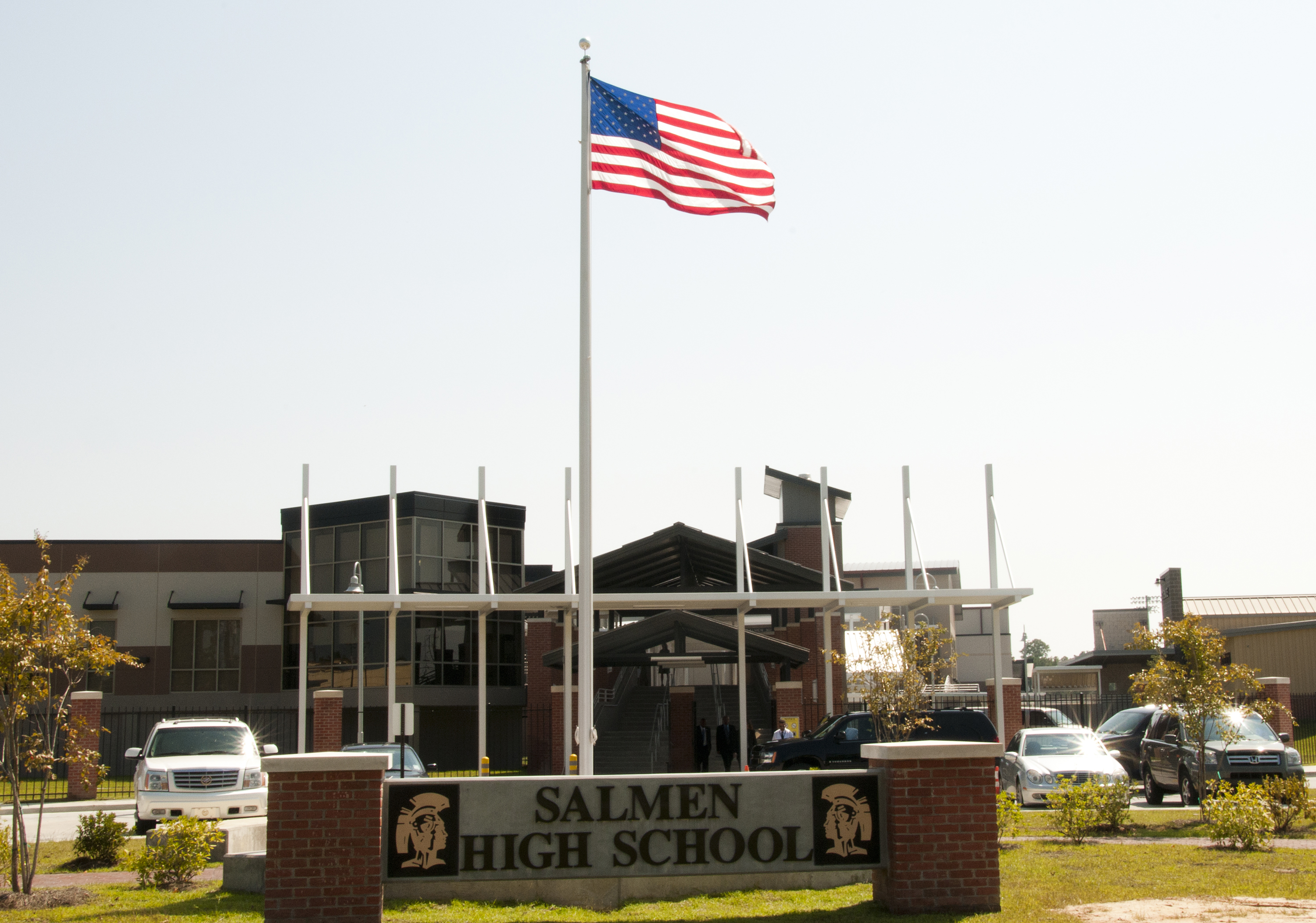

Location
- 300 Spartan Dr. Slidell, Louisiana 70458; United States; 30.24755°N 89.79038°W

Information
- Type: Public secondary
- Established: 1965
- School district: St. Tammany Parish Public Schools
- Principal: Liza Jacobs
- Teaching staff: 70.08 (FTE)
- Enrollment: 1,191 (2023–2024)
- Student to teacher ratio: 16.99
- Colors: Black and Gold
- Team name: Spartans
- Website: Salmen High School homepage

Salmen High School is a public high school in Slidell, Louisiana, United States, under the St. Tammany Parish School Board.

The school serves southern Slidell and Eden Isle.

== History ==
Hurricane Katrina destroyed Salmen, pushing a storm surge of over 8 feet through the area. All the buildings were destroyed, with the exception of the new science wing, which was part of the original building. After the storm, the school was closed for just over a month, but on October 3, 2005, Salmen started a platooning schedule at Northshore High School, which was mostly untouched by the storm. Northshore students attended from 6:55 a.m. to 12:35 p.m., and Salmen attended from 1:25 p.m. to 6:55 p.m. In mid January, the Federal Emergency Management Agency's assessment showed that more than 51% of the Salmen campus was damaged beyond repair, meaning that everything except the science building would have to be demolished and rebuilt. On January 17, 2006, Salmen moved into the rebuilt St. Tammany Jr. High School, and finished the year there. Before the storm, Salmen had just over 1,000 students. As of February 21, 2006, about 800 of them have returned. A temporary school was being built for the 2006–2007 and 2007–2008 school years. The new school was completed in the summer of 2010 and in August, the staff moved into the new building permanently. The new school that was finished in 2010 is elevated 15 ft to feature tuck-under parking.

== Athletics ==
Salmen High athletics competes in the LHSAA.

=== Championships ===
Football championships

- (3) State Championships: 1994, 1995, 2000

Football, girls' basketball and baseball teams won state championships in 1996, bringing a total of three state championships to Salmen High School for the 1995–96 academic year.

== Notable alumni ==
- Terreal Bierria – former Georgia and Seattle Seahawks strong safety
- Kalani Brown (born 1997) – Israeli Female Basketball Premier League center and former Baylor National Champion (2019 Women's Champion)
- Chris Duhon – Los Angeles Lakers point guard and Duke graduate
- Isame Faciane – former NFL player and indoor football player for the Tucson Sugar Skulls
- Mike Fontenot – former Baltimore Orioles top pick and Chicago Cubs second baseman
- Alan Risher – former LSU and USFL quarterback and NFL player
- Jamal Robinson – former NFL and CFL wide receiver
- Daniel Sams – former McNeese State starting quarterback
- Mike Sutton – former LSU defensive lineman and NFL player
- Corey Vinson – assistant coach for the Brooklyn Nets

== See also ==
- Northshore High School
- Fontainebleau High School
- List of high schools in Louisiana
