= Corey Vinson =

American basketball player and coach

Brooklyn Nets
- Title: Assistant coach
- League: NBA

Personal information
- Born: April 14, 1997 (age 29) Atlanta, Georgia, U.S.
- Listed height: 6 ft 1 in (1.85 m)
- Listed weight: 170 lb (77 kg)

Career information
- High school: Salmen (Slidell, Louisiana)
- College: New Orleans (2015–2016)
- Position: Point guard
- Coaching career: 2023–present

Career history

Coaching
- 2023–present: Brooklyn Nets (assistant)

Corey Michael Vinson (born April 14, 1997) is an American professional basketball coach and former player who is an assistant coach for the Brooklyn Nets of the National Basketball Association (NBA).

== High school career ==
Vinson attended Salmen High School in Slidell, Louisiana. He played basketball under head coach Jesse Carlin. Vinson helped the team to a 65–18 record while with the school, winning one District 7-4A and two District 8-4A championships. Vinson averaged 16.2 points, 7.1 rebounds, and 5.8 assists as a senior at Salmen High.

== College career ==
Vinson played college basketball for the New Orleans Privateers. Vinson only played two games in his collegiate career for New Orleans during the 2015–16 season. Vinson appeared in a loss against Bowling Green and a win against Blue Mountain College.

Vinson ended his college playing career and transferred to Louisiana State University to complete his bachelor's degree. With the LSU men's basketball team, Vinson was a student manager and graduate assistant for the team.

== Coaching career ==
Vinson began his coaching career in the National Basketball Association with the Phoenix Suns in 2020. He would work in several roles with the team including player development coach and head video coordinator. Vinson was on the team when the Suns made a trip to the 2021 NBA Finals, losing the championship to the Milwaukee Bucks in six games.

In 2023, Vinson was hired as an assistant coach for the Brooklyn Nets. Vinson joined the staff in 2023 under then head coach Jacque Vaughn.

== Personal life ==
Vinson was born in Atlanta, Georgia and grew up in his hometown of Slidell, Louisiana. Vinson is the son of former NBA player and current NBA assistant coach Fred Vinson.

Vinson has five brothers: Anderson, Niko, Chris, Noah, and Fred Jr. Vinson has other family members in professional sports, his cousin Manuel White played in the NFL for the Washington Redskins.
