= Lakeshore High School =

Location
- 1 Titan Trace; Mandeville, Louisiana 70448; United States; 30.40595°N 89.96573°W

Information
- Type: Public secondary
- Established: 2009
- School district: St. Tammany Parish Public Schools
- Principal: April Jarrell
- Staff: 66.24 (FTE)
- Grades: 9–12
- Enrollment: 835 (2024–2025)
- Student to teacher ratio: 12.61
- Campus: Suburban
- Colors: Black and silver
- Mascot: Titan
- Team name: Titans
- Rival: Fontainebleau High School Mandeville High School
- Website: lakeshorehigh.stpsb.org

Lakeshore High School is a public high school located in unincorporated St. Tammany Parish, Louisiana, United States, north of Mandeville. Lakeshore High School receives the students from Monteleone Junior High School. The school is operated by the St. Tammany Parish Public Schools district.

The school serves almost all of Lacombe and a small section of Mandeville. Lakeshore was founded in 2009 and its current enrollment is around 835 students, as of Spring 2025. The current mascot for Lakeshore High School is the Titans, and they are rivals of the Fontainebleau Bulldogs and the Mandeville Skippers.

== Academics ==
The school offers many AP courses including Calculus, English III, and Human Geography.

== Athletics ==
- Lakeshore High School is a member of District 8-4A in the Louisiana High School Athletic Association.

=== Championships ===
- Lakeshore High School boys Cross- Country team has won 5 District Championships in the following years; 2016, 2017, 2018, 2019, 2020
- Lakeshore High School football have been District Champions for the following years; 2017, 2018, 2019, 2020, 2022, 2025

The school football team made it to the LHSAA state championship in the 2017 season.

- Lakeshore High School girls soccer won the 2016 state championship. They came in second place for the 2019, and 2021 season.

Lakeshore High School boys & girls soccer made it to the state championship in the 2019 season.

- Lakeshore High School boys Swim team 4x state-runner up in the D-II LHSAA State; 2020, 2021, 2022, 2023.
- Lakeshore High School boys & girls track District Champs; 2017, 2018, 2019
- Lakeshore High School Baseball team D-II LHSAA State runner-up; 2023.

== Notable alumni ==
- Treston Decoud, NFL player, selected 169th in the 2017 draft by the Houston Texans
