= Treston Decoud =

American football player (born 1993)

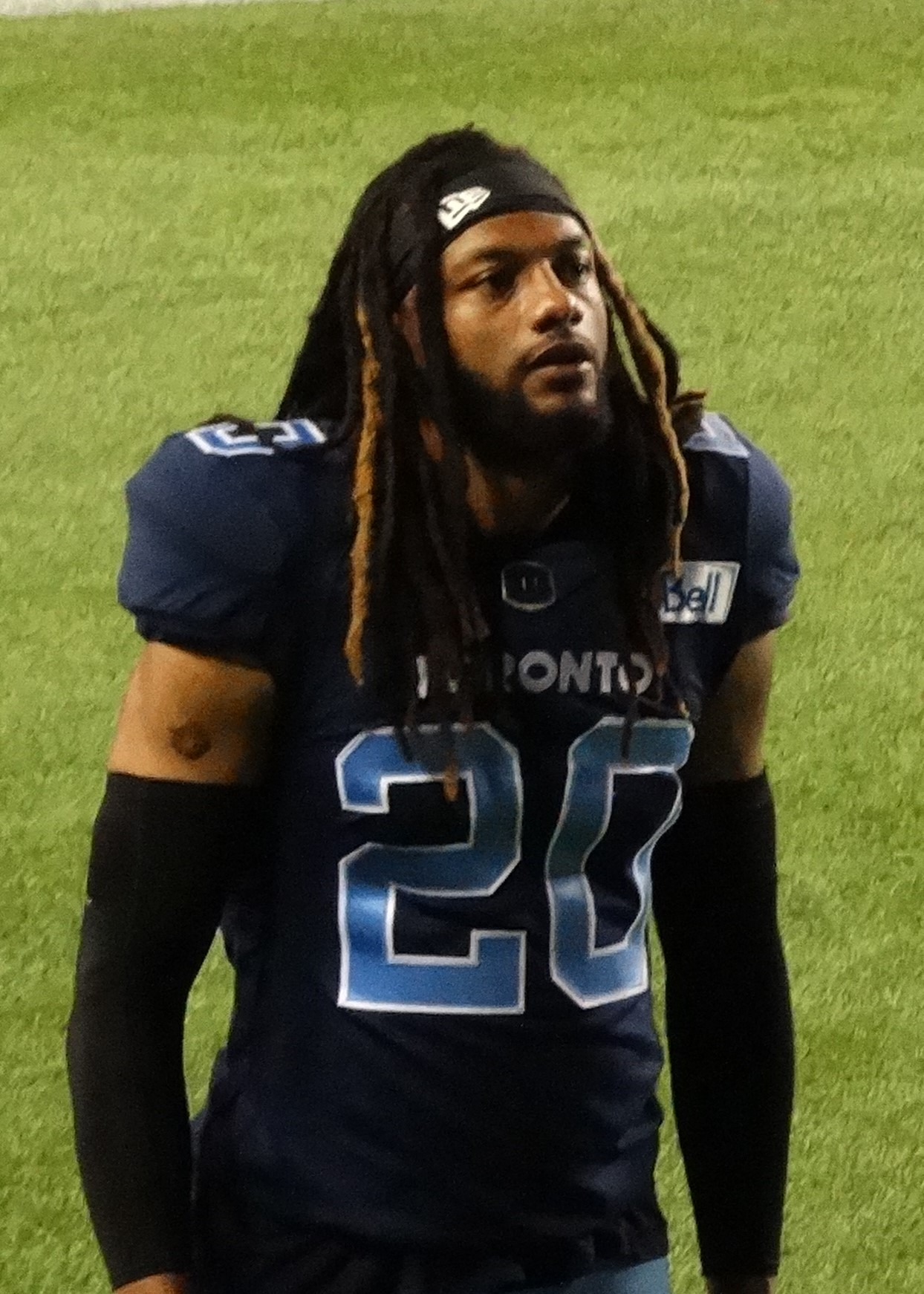
- Decoud with the Toronto Argonauts in 2021

Idaho Vandals football
- Title: Defensive backs coach

Personal information
- Born: August 1, 1993 (age 33); Covington, Louisiana, U.S.
- Listed height: 6 ft 2 in (1.88 m)
- Listed weight: 205 lb (93 kg)

Career information
- High school: Lakeshore (Mandeville, Louisiana)
- College: Oregon State
- NFL draft: 2017: 5th round, 169th overall pick

Career history

Playing
- Houston Texans (2017); Dallas Cowboys (2018); Dallas Renegades (2020); Toronto Argonauts (2021); Edmonton Elks (2022); New Jersey Generals (2023)

Coaching
- Oregon State (2024) (Graduate assistant); Idaho (2025-present) (Cornerbacks coach)

Career NFL statistics
- Total tackles: 7
- Pass deflections: 1
- Stats at Pro Football Reference

Career CFL statistics
- Total tackles: 68
- Sacks: 1
- Forced fumbles: 1

Treston Decoud (/ˈtrɛstən deɪˈkuː/ TRES-tən day-KOO; born August 1, 1993) is an American former professional football player who was a defensive back in the National Football League (NFL) and Canadian Football League (CFL). He played college football for the Oregon State Beavers. He was a member of the Houston Texans, Dallas Cowboys, Dallas Renegades, Toronto Argonauts, Edmonton Elks and New Jersey Generals.

== Early life ==
Decoud attended Lakeshore High School. As a senior, he registered 56 tackles, 3 interceptions, 23 receptions for 356 yards, 3 receiving touchdowns, 12 carries for 178 rushing yards and one rushing touchdown. He received All-district honors at 4 different positions during his prep career.

He qualified for the state track & field championships as a sprinter in his last 2 years.

== College career ==
Decoud accepted a football scholarship from Chadron State College. He was redshirted in 2012. As a freshman in 2013, he made 4 tackles and one pass defensed in 10 games as a backup.

He transferred to Northwest Mississippi Community College for his sophomore season in 2014. He posted 38 tackles, 6 interceptions (third in the nation), 7 passes defensed (led the team), one forced fumble and 2 blocked kicks. He received All-MACJC, All-NJCAA Region 23 and NJCAA All-American honors.

Decoud transferred to Oregon State University for his junior season in 2015. He was named the starter at left cornerback, appearing in 10 games with 9 starts. He missed 2 contests with an injury. He registered 50 tackles (fifth on the team), one sack, 3.5 tackles for loss, 5 passes defensed (led the team)

As a senior in 2016, he started all 12 games at left cornerback. He recorded 58 tackles (sixth on the team), 2 interceptions, 10 passes defensed (led the team). He returned an interception for a 75-yard touchdown against Idaho State University.

== Professional career ==
Pre-draft measurables
Height	Weight	Arm length	Hand span	Wingspan	40-yard dash	10-yard split	20-yard split	20-yard shuttle	Three-cone drill	Vertical jump	Broad jump	Bench press
6 ft 1 7/8 in (1.88 m)	206 lb (93 kg)	33 in (0.84 m)	9 1/4 in (0.23 m)	6 ft 5 1/4 in (1.96 m)	4.57 s	1.57 s	2.64 s	4.53 s	7.20 s	31.0 in (0.79 m)	9 ft 7 in (2.92 m)	11 reps
All values from NFL Combine/Pro Day

=== Houston Texans ===
Decoud was selected by the Houston Texans in the fifth round (169th overall) of the 2017 NFL draft. On May 12, the Texans signed Decoud to a four-year, $2.64 million contract that included a signing bonus of $249,339.

On September 1, 2018, Decoud was waived by the Texans.

=== Dallas Cowboys ===
On September 4, 2018, Decoud was signed to the practice squad of the Dallas Cowboys. He was promoted to the active roster on November 1, 2018. He was waived on November 9, 2018. He was re-signed to the practice squad on November 26, 2018. He signed a reserve/future contract with the Cowboys on January 15, 2019. He was released on August 31, 2019.

=== Dallas Renegades ===
Decoud joined the Dallas Renegades of the XFL after being selected in the 2020 XFL draft. In March, amid the COVID-19 pandemic, the league announced that it would be cancelling the rest of the season. Playing in all 5 games, he registered 13 tackles and no interceptions. He had his contract terminated when the league suspended operations on April 10, 2020.

=== Toronto Argonauts ===
On February 3, 2021, Decoud signed with the Toronto Argonauts of the Canadian Football League (CFL). He played in 13 regular season games in 2021 where he had 25 defensive tackles and one special teams tackle. He spent part of 2022 training camp with the team, but was released after the first pre-season game on May 29, 2022.

=== Edmonton Elks ===
After being cut by Toronto, Decoud joined the Edmonton Elks of CFL on June 7, 2022. He was released on December 1, 2022.

=== New Jersey Generals ===
On March 31, 2023, Decoud signed with the New Jersey Generals of the United States Football League (USFL). He was released on April 10. He re-signed with the team on April 20, and was subsequently transferred to their inactive list.

== Personal life ==
He is a cousin of former NFL player Thomas DeCoud.
