= North Shore High School =

North Shore High School can refer to:

- North Shore High School, school in Cleveland, Ohio Cuyahoga County, Ohio
- North Shore High School (Glen Head, New York)
- North Shore High School (North Dakota) in Makoti, North Dakota
- North Shore Senior High School (Texas) in Harris County, Texas, near Houston
- Northshore High School in Slidell, Louisiana
- North Shore High School, a fictitious high school, located in Evanston, Illinois, in the film Mean Girls
- North Shore High School, a former high school in West Palm Beach, Florida (Shut down in 1987)
