= Arch Manning =

American football player (born 2004)

- Manning with the Texas Longhorns in 2026

No. 16 – Texas Longhorns
- Position: Quarterback
- Class: Redshirt Junior

Personal information
- Born: April 27, 2004 (age 22); New Orleans, Louisiana, U.S.
- Listed height: 6 ft 4 in (1.93 m)
- Listed weight: 222 lb (101 kg)

Career information
- High school: Isidore Newman (New Orleans)
- College: Texas (2023–present)

Awards and highlights
- Citrus Bowl MVP (2025)
- Stats at ESPN

Archibald Charles Manning (born April 27, 2004) is an American college football quarterback for the Texas Longhorns. He is a member of the Manning family of football players.

== Early life ==
Archibald Charles Manning was born on April 27, 2004, in New Orleans, Louisiana. Arch is Cooper Manning and Ellen Heidingsfelder's oldest son, grandson to Archie Manning, and nephew of Peyton Manning and Eli Manning, all three former NFL quarterbacks. His younger brother, Heid, was the center for the football team and played lacrosse at Isidore Newman School.

== High school career ==
=== 2019 season ===
Manning played high school football at Isidore Newman School in New Orleans. In his freshman year, Manning was the varsity starter at quarterback, the first freshman quarterback to start Newman's season opener in at least 40 years. He shone in his debut, leading Newman to a 26-point victory. In the final game of the season against Dunham, Manning threw for only 71 yards on 20 attempts and 10 completions. They would lose, 22–20. Manning completed his freshman season with 2,509 yards and 34 touchdowns, earning MaxPreps National Freshman of the Year honors.

=== 2020 season ===
Manning opened his sophomore season by scoring six touchdowns against East Jefferson. On October 15, 2020, he made his national television debut in a game against Booker T. Washington, throwing for two touchdowns and rushing for two more. In a game where Newman beat Cohen, 76–0, Manning passed for 169 yards and five touchdowns in the first quarter of action before being pulled from the game. In the first round of the Division III playoffs, Newman received a bye and played Catholic – N.I. in the second round. Manning would throw for 127 yards and a touchdown in the 14–7 win. In the final game of the season in the semifinals, Manning completed less than 50 percent of his passes and threw an interception in a loss to Lafayette Christian Academy, 21–7.

=== 2021 season ===
Manning was again named the starting quarterback for Newman for his junior season in 2021. In Newman's first game against Vandebilt Catholic, Manning passed for 258 yards and accounted for all four touchdowns in the 28-point shutout victory. Weeks later, Manning went a perfect 11-of-11 for 179 yards and five total touchdowns in the first half of their 70–0 win over Fisher. Manning had another perfect night against Cohen, going 9-of-9 for 153 yards and five passing touchdowns in the 34-point shutout win. In the second round of the playoffs, Manning played Episcopal and threw for 164 yards and accounted for three touchdowns in the 37—6 win. The following week, Lafayette Christian would blow out Newman, 49–7. In 2021, Manning threw for 1,841 yards, 26 touchdowns, and four interceptions while having six rushing touchdowns.

=== 2022 season ===
Manning was the captain of the Newman football team for his senior season in 2022. In their matchup against Pearl River, Manning threw for 356 yards and seven touchdowns in a 59–7 victory, breaking his uncle Eli's Newman record of 7,268 career passing yards and his uncle Peyton's Newman record of 93 career touchdowns.

=== College recruiting ===
College recruiting
Name	Hometown	School	Height	Weight	Commit date
Arch Manning; QB	New Orleans	Isidore Newman	6 ft 3 in (1.91 m)	204 lb (93 kg)	Jun 23, 2022
Arch Manning; QB	Recruit ratings: Rivals: 247Sports: ESPN: (93)				

To avoid a media frenzy, Manning's family withheld him from media interviews and also declined premature college scholarship offers. He ran a private account on Instagram, allowing only friends and coaches to follow him, including Ole Miss head coach Lane Kiffin. "They've shut down everything," said one member of the local media, "but the attention is going to come." In his college search he visited SMU, Clemson, LSU, Alabama, Texas, Georgia, and Virginia, as well as Ole Miss, his grandfather's, father's, and uncle's former team. On December 21, 2022, Manning signed a letter of intent to play for the University of Texas and committed on June 23, 2022; only then did he make his account public.

=== High school statistics ===
Season	Games		Passing							Rushing		
Season	GP	Record	Cmp	Att	Pct	Yds	TD	Int	Rtg	Att	Yds	TD
2019	11	9–2	204	316	64.6	2,509	34	6	116.9	12	87	4
2020	10	9–1	149	220	67.7	1,919	21	7	113.4	29	224	8
2021	10	7–3	149	231	64.5	1,841	26	4	119.3	42	356	6
2022	11	8–3	140	229	61.1	2,270	34	2	130.3	15	81	1
Career	42	33–9	642	996	64.5	8,539	115	19	122.1	98	748	19

== College career ==
=== 2023 season ===
After playing in the spring game for Team Orange, Manning was named the team's third-string quarterback behind Quinn Ewers and Maalik Murphy. Manning made his collegiate debut on November 24, during the third quarter of a blowout win against Texas Tech, completing 2-of-5 passing attempts for 30 yards. After the season, Manning was redshirted.

=== 2024 season ===
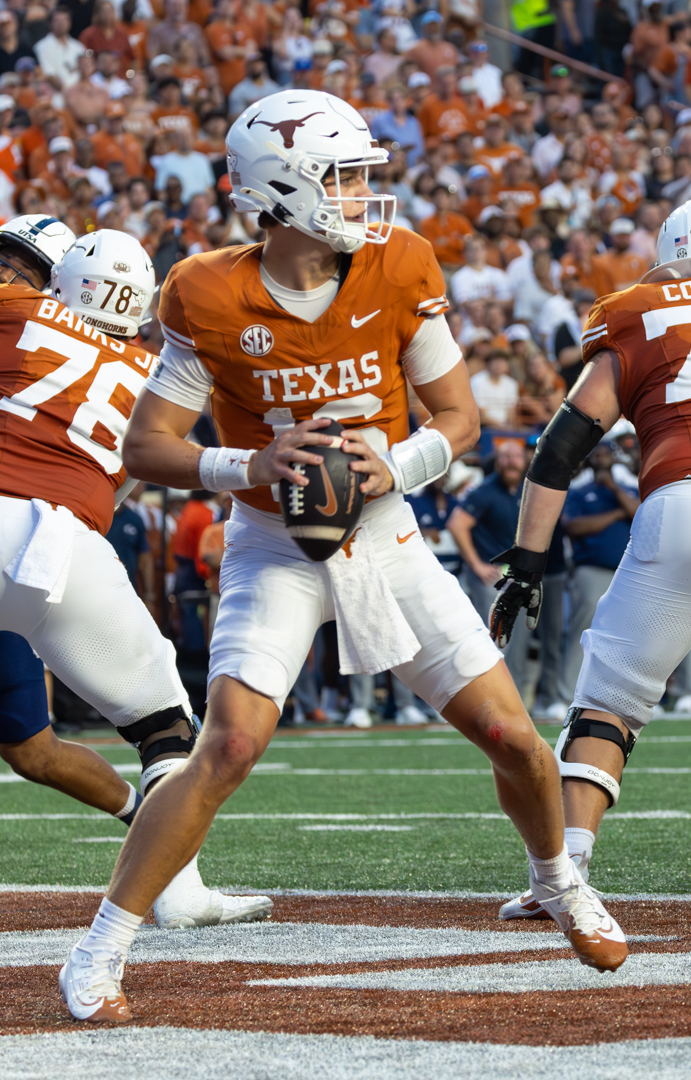
Manning with the Texas Longhorns in 2024.

Manning made his 2024 season debut against Colorado State when he entered the game in relief of Ewers during the third quarter while the Longhorns had a 38–0 lead. Manning finished with five completions for 95 yards and a touchdown. He also added a rushing touchdown. Against UTSA, Ewers left with an abdominal injury in the second quarter forcing Manning to come into the game with a 14–0 lead. On his first play of the game, Manning threw a 19-yard touchdown to DeAndre Moore. Two plays later, he rushed for a 67-yard touchdown to put the Longhorns ahead 28–7. After Manning threw a 75-yard strike to freshman wide receiver Ryan Wingo to go up 42–7, he added another passing touchdown in the fourth quarter to go up 49–7 before being relieved by freshman Trey Owens. Manning finished the game with 223 passing yards, 67 rushing yards, and five total touchdowns (four passing, one rushing) as Texas blew out UTSA, 56–7. On September 19, head coach Steve Sarkisian announced that Manning would be the starting quarterback the following week against Louisiana–Monroe. This announcement came after Manning shared the title of SEC Freshman of the Week with Texas A&M quarterback Marcel Reed for Week 3. He was also named Earl Campbell Tyler Rose Award National Player of the Week and was tabbed to the Davey O'Brien Award Great 8 list.

=== 2025 season ===
Manning was named the starting quarterback for the preseason #1 Texas Longhorns heading into the 2025 season. In the first game against the defending national champion #3 Ohio State Buckeyes, Manning struggled as he completed 17 of 30 passes for 170 yards, a touchdown, and an interception as the Longhorns lost 14–7 on the road. In the Week 4 win against Sam Houston, Manning completed 18 of 21 passes for 309 yards, three passing touchdowns, and two rushing touchdowns, becoming the fourth Texas quarterback with at least two rushing touchdowns and two passing touchdowns in a game. In Week 9 against Mississippi State, Manning completed 29 of 46 passes for 346 yards, three passing touchdowns, and one rushing touchdown. For his performance, he was named one of eight Manning Award "Stars of the Week". In Week 10 against Vanderbilt, Manning completed 25 of 33 passes for 328 yards and three passing touchdowns, earning him SEC Offensive Player of the Week, Manning Award "Stars of the Week", and Davey O'Brien Award's Great 8. On November 22 against the Arkansas Razorbacks, Manning became the first player in program history to record a passing, receiving, and rushing touchdown in the same game, scoring six total times and logging 389 passing yards.

=== 2026 season ===
Manning makes a play against Missouri.

Manning is currently the starting quarterback for the Texas Longhorns. In their second game of the season, Manning led the #4 ranked Longhorns to a win against the #1 ranked Ohio State Buckeyes, with a score of 24–23. In Week 6, Manning threw three touchdowns and two interceptions in the Red River Shootout against the unranked Oklahoma Sooners, losing 24–27. In Week 11, Manning threw 1 passing touchdown and three interceptions against #24 ranked Louisiana State Tigers with a winning score of 22-21.

=== College statistics ===
Season	Team	Games			Passing								Rushing				Receiving		
Season	Team	GP	GS	Record	Cmp	Att	Pct	Yds	Avg	TD	Int	Rtg	Att	Yds	Avg	TD	Rec	Yds	TD
2023	Texas	2	0	—	2	5	40.0	30	6.0	0	0	90.4	3	7	2.3	0	–	–	–
2024	Texas	10	2	2–0	61	90	67.8	939	10.4	9	2	184.0	25	108	4.3	4	–	–	–
2025	Texas	13	13	10–3	248	404	61.4	3,163	7.8	26	7	144.9	92	399	4.3	10	1	4	1
2026	Texas	11	11	9–2	208	314	66.2	2,485	7.9	21	10	148.2	93	170	1.8	4	-	-	-
Career		36	26	21–5	519	813	63.8	6,617	8.1	56	19	150.3	213	684	3.2	18	1	4	1

== Selected highlights and awards ==
=== College ===
- Citrus Bowl MVP (2025)

=== High school ===
Awards

- Bobby Dodd National Back of the Year (2022)
- MaxPreps Sophomore All-American Second Team (2020)
- MaxPreps Freshman All-American First Team (2019)
- 4× LFCA 2A All-State First Team (2019–2022)
- LCWA 2A All-State First Team (2022)

Records

- Isidore Newman career total yards: 9,754
- Isidore Newman career total touchdowns: 140
- Isidore Newman career passing yards: 8,539
- Isidore Newman career passing touchdowns: 115
- Isidore Newman single-game passing touchdowns: 7 (September 30, 2022, vs. Pearl River)
