= Lewisburg, Louisiana =

- Census-designated place
- Location within Louisiana Location within the United States
- Coordinates: 30°22′11″N 90°06′11″W
- Country: United States
- State: Louisiana
- Parish: St. Tammany

Area
  - Total: 1.15 sq mi (2.97 km^{2})
  - Land: 0.50 sq mi (1.30 km^{2})
  - Water: 0.64 sq mi (1.66 km^{2})
- Elevation: 7 ft (2.1 m)

Population (2020)
  - Total: 420
  - Density: 835.5/sq mi (322.59/km^{2})
- Time zone: UTC-6 (Central (CST))
  - Summer (DST): UTC-5 (CDT)
- ZIP code: 70448
- Area code: 985
- GNIS feature ID: 1627477
- FIPS code: 22-43640

Lewisburg is an unincorporated community and census-designated place in St. Tammany Parish, Louisiana, United States. The community is located 7 miles (11.27 kilometres) south of Covington, Louisiana. It was first listed as a CDP in the 2020 census with a population of 420.

== Demographics ==
Historical population
Census	Pop.	Note	%±
2020	420		—
U.S. Decennial Census; 2020

Lewisburg first appeared as a census designated place in the 2020 U.S. census.

Lewisburg CDP, Louisiana – Demographic Profile (NH = Non-Hispanic)
Race / Ethnicity	Pop 2020	% 2020
White alone (NH)	355	84.52%
Black or African American alone (NH)	5	1.19%
Native American or Alaska Native alone (NH)	0	0.00%
Asian alone (NH)	6	1.43%
Pacific Islander alone (NH)	1	0.24%
Some Other Race alone (NH)	3	0.71%
Mixed Race/Multi-Racial (NH)	18	4.29%
Hispanic or Latino (any race)	32	7.62%
Total	420	100.00%

Note: the US Census Bureau treats Hispanic/Latino as an ethnic category. This table excludes Latinos from the racial categories and assigns them to a separate category. Hispanics/Latinos can be of any race.

At the 2020 census, its population was 420, with a predominantly non-Hispanic white population.

== Education ==
Lewisburg is in the St. Tammany Parish Public Schools school district.

Schools which have Lewisburg in their attendance boundaries include: Mandeville Elementary School (grades Kindergarten-3), Tchefuncte Middle School (grades 5–6), Mandeville Junior High School (grades 7–8), and Mandeville High School (grades 9–12).

St. Tammany Parish is within the service areas of two community colleges: Northshore Technical Community College and Delgado Community College.
