= Harvey School (Mandeville) =

Harvey School was a college preparatory school in Mandeville, Louisiana in the late 19th century. Andrew Querbes, then of New Orleans and later the mayor of Shreveport, attended the school.
