= Andrew Querbes =

American banker and politician (1864–1939)

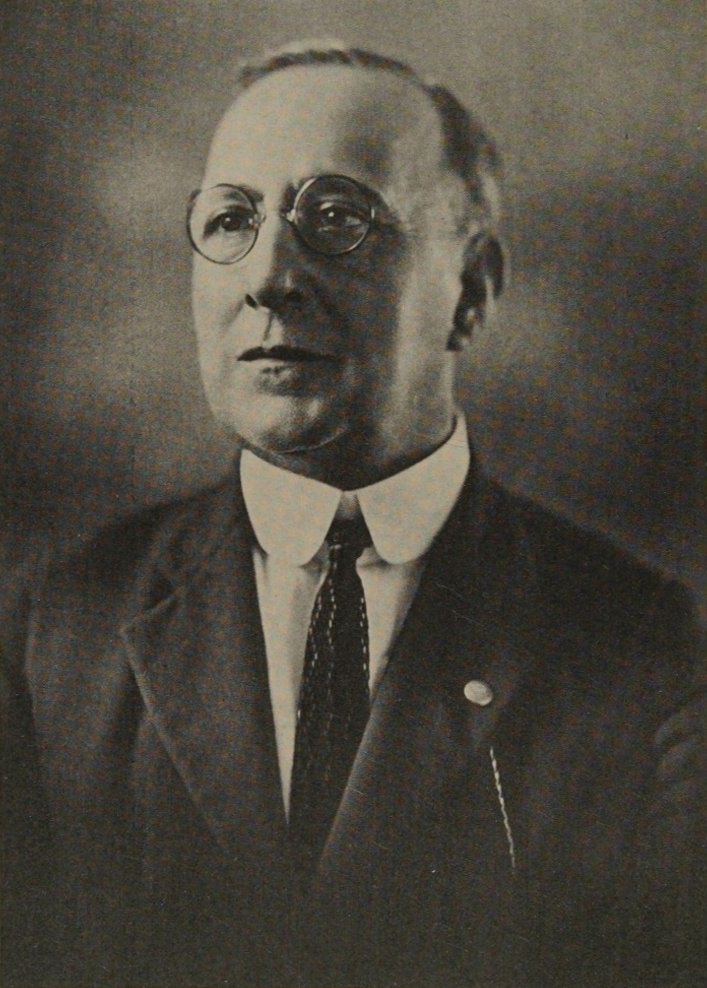
- Andrew Querbes some time before 1925

Mayor of Shreveport, Louisiana
- In office 1902–1906
- Preceded by: Benjamin Holzman
- Succeeded by: Ernest Ralph Berstein

Personal details
- Born: July 10, 1864 New Orleans
- Died: May 24, 1939 (aged 74)
- Spouse: Alexandrine Ricou (m. 1889)

Andrew Querbes (July 10, 1864 – May 24, 1939) was a businessman, banker, and politician who served as mayor of Shreveport, Louisiana from 1902 to 1906.

== Early life ==
Andrew Querbes, born Andre Querbes, was born on July 10, 1864 in New Orleans during the American Civil War. He was educated at the Harvey School and moved to Shreveport when he was 17, in 1881.

== Career ==
He worked as a grocer for a time but moved back to New Orleans, before again returned to Shreveport in 1886 with his widowed mother. He sold merchandise and was a grocer along the city's wharf, and became very successful in a few years. He expanded his business operations, eventually purchasing a cotton plantation a manufacturing outfit. From 1896 to 1900 he also served on the Caddo Parish Police Jury, which governed the parish.

Querbes was elected mayor for two terms, from 1902 to 1906. In his mayorship he cracked down on violators of the Sunday laws and gambling dens. He also rehabilitated the city's financial situation. In 1905, a Yellow fever scare caused 4,000 to flee from Shreveport. Querbes established a quarantine zone. Although panic was widespread only a few cases were reported. Under Querbes, Shreveport paved 34 streets and a new city hall was built.

After declining to run another term as mayor, he promoted the cause of paving roads and improving Caddo Parish's highway system. He also served for years, and had helped set up, the Shreveport Chamber of Commerce. He chaired a committee advocating in Washington, D.C. for the establishment of Barksdale Air Force Base in the Shreveport area. He was treasurer of the Louisiana State Fair for 30 years. Querbes began as vice president of First National Bank, before becoming president in 1909, retiring in January 1939.

== Personal life and legacy ==
Querbes married Alexandrine Ricou in 1889. He was survived by three sons. He was a Roman Catholic, a Rotarian and an Elk. He died on May 24, 1939. Named after him are Querbes Street, Querbes Park and Querbes Golf Course in Shreveport.
