= Xavier Paul =

American baseball player (born 1985)

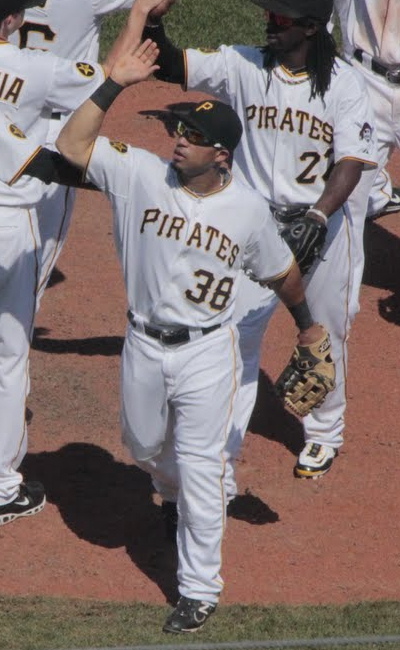
- Paul with the Pittsburgh Pirates in 2011

Xavier Gold Rush
- Outfielder / Coach
- Born: February 25, 1985 (age 41); Slidell, Louisiana, U.S.
- Batted: Left Threw: Right

MLB debut
- May 7, 2009, for the Los Angeles Dodgers

Last appearance
- August 29, 2014, for the Arizona Diamondbacks

MLB statistics
- Batting average: .250
- Home runs: 12
- Runs batted in: 71
- Stats at Baseball Reference

Teams
- Los Angeles Dodgers (2009–2011); Pittsburgh Pirates (2011); Cincinnati Reds (2012–2013); Arizona Diamondbacks (2014)

Xavier Brooks Paul Jr. (born February 25, 1985) is an American former professional baseball outfielder. He played in Major League Baseball (MLB) for the Los Angeles Dodgers, Pittsburgh Pirates, Cincinnati Reds, and Arizona Diamondbacks.

== Early life ==
While at Slidell High School in 2003 he was selected to Baseball America's second team High School All-American team after batting .391 with nine homers, 17 RBIs and 18 stolen bases. He then hit .444 for Team USA at the 2003 Pan American Games. He also played with the 2001 Junior National Team that won a gold medal at the World Championships. He was named the state of Louisiana 2003 Mr. Baseball.

== Playing career ==
=== Los Angeles Dodgers ===
Paul was drafted by the Los Angeles Dodgers in the fourth round, with the 121st overall selection, of the 2003 Major League Baseball draft. He made his professional debut with the rookie-level Ogden Raptors and was selected to the Rookie League All-Star team after hitting .307 in 69 appearances.

In 2004, Paul was tagged by Baseball America as having the best outfield arm in the Dodgers system and as the Dodgers seventh-best prospect. He hit .262 with nine home runs, 72 RBI, and 10 stolen bases for the Single-A Columbus Catfish that season.

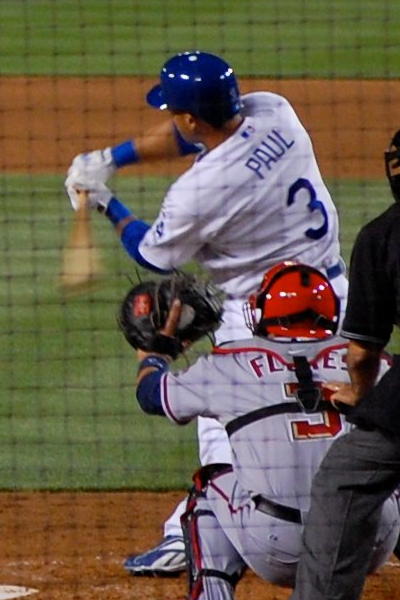
Paul batting for the Dodgers in 2009

Paul played for the High-A Vero Beach Dodgers in 2005 and 2006, and was ranked by Baseball America as the Best Defensive outfielder in the entire Single-A level.

In 2007, Paul played for the Double-A Jacksonville Suns, hitting .291 with 11 home runs and 17 stolen bases. Paul was selected to the Southern League Mid-season All-Star Team. He played in the Arizona Fall League after the season and was promoted to the Las Vegas 51s and placed on the Dodgers 40 man roster for the 2008 season. Paul hit .316 with nine home runs, 68 RBI, and 17 stolen bases for Las Vegas that season across 115 appearances.

Paul began the 2009 season with the Triple-A Albuquerque Isotopes, and on May 7, 2009, was called up by the Dodgers to replace Manny Ramirez, who was suspended for testing positive for performance-enhancing drugs. Paul made his Major League debut the same day, grounding into a double play in his one at bat as a pinch hitter against the Washington Nationals. His first major league hit was against the San Francisco Giants three days later, and he hit his first home run against the Florida Marlins on May 15.

Shortly afterwards Paul was sidelined by a staph infection and placed on the disabled list. While rehabbing at the Dodgers complex in Arizona, he then suffered an ankle injury and spent the rest of the year on the 60-day disabled list.

Paul appeared in 44 games with the Dodgers in 2010, thanks to a succession of injuries to Ramirez. He hit .231 over that period before he was returned to the minors. He appeared in 57 games with the Isotopes during the season, hitting .325 in 57 games but a late season injury made him unavailable for a September callup.

Paul began the season with the Dodgers in 2011 but after he appeared in seven games and had three hits in 11 at-bats, Paul was designated for assignment on April 18, 2011.

=== Pittsburgh Pirates ===
On April 26, 2011, Paul was claimed off waivers by the Pittsburgh Pirates. With the Pirates, he appeared in 121 games, hitting .254 with 16 stolen bases. Paul was designated for assignment on November 18, and released by the organization on November 28.

=== Washington Nationals ===
On December 20, 2011, Paul signed a minor league contract with the Washington Nationals that included an invitation to spring training. In 60 appearances for the Triple-A Syracuse Chiefs, he batted .315/.376/.512 with eight home runs, 44 RBI, and six stolen bases. Paul was released by the Nationals organization on July 3, 2012.

=== Cincinnati Reds ===
On July 7, 2012, Paul signed a minor league contract with the Cincinnati Reds and was assigned to the Triple-A Louisville Bats. On July 18, the Reds selected Paul's contract, adding him to their active roster. In 55 games for Cincinnati, he slashed .314/.379/.465 with two home runs, seven RBI, and four stolen bases.

Paul made 97 appearances for Cincinnati during the 2013 campaign, hitting .244/.339/.402 with seven home runs and 32 RBI. On December 2, 2013, the Reds non-tendered Paul, making him a free agent.

=== Baltimore Orioles ===
On December 19, 2013, Paul signed a minor league contract with the Baltimore Orioles. He made 81 appearances for the Triple-A Norfolk Tides, hitting .254/.316/.431 with 12 home runs and 56 RBI. Paul was released by the Orioles organization on August 3, 2014.

=== Arizona Diamondbacks ===
On August 7, 2014, Paul signed a minor league contract with the Arizona Diamondbacks. He played that day for the Triple-A Reno Aces, and was selected to Arizona's active roster the following day. In 14 games for the Diamondbacks, Paul went 2-for-20 (.100). Following Arizona's acquisition of Nolan Reimold on August 29, Paul was released.

=== Philadelphia Phillies ===
On November 13, 2014, Paul signed a minor league contract with the Philadelphia Phillies organization. He was released prior to the start of the season on March 16, 2015.

=== Delfines del Carmen ===
On May 6, 2016, Paul signed with the Delfines del Carmen of the Mexican League. In 25 games for Carmen, he batted .242/.289/.385 with three home runs and 12 RBI. Paul was released by the Delfines on June 8.

=== Texas Rangers ===
On July 2, 2017, Paul signed a minor league contract with the Texas Rangers. In 9 games split between the rookie-level Arizona League Rangers and Triple-A Round Rock Express, he went 1-for-5 (.200). Paul was released by the Rangers organization on February 5, 2018.

=== Southern Maryland Blue Crabs ===
On February 14, 2018, Paul signed with the Southern Maryland Blue Crabs of the Atlantic League of Professional Baseball. In 6 games for the Blue Crabs, he went 3-for-21 (.143) with 1 RBI and 4 walks. Paul was released by Southern Maryland on May 8.

== Coaching career ==
On November 20, 2024, the Xavier University of Louisiana hired Paul to serve as their head coach.
