= Daniel Sams (American football) =

American football player (born 1992)

Profile
- Position: Quarterback

Personal information
- Born: October 1, 1992 (age 34); Slidell, Louisiana, U.S.
- Listed height: 6 ft 2 in (1.88 m)
- Listed weight: 207 lb (94 kg)

Career information
- High school: Slidell (LA) Salmen
- College: Kansas State (2011–2013); McNeese State (2014–2015)
- NFL draft: 2016: undrafted

Daniel Sams (born October 1, 1992) is an American football quarterback. He last played for the McNeese State Cowboys.

== Early life ==
Sams attended Salmen High School in Slidell, Louisiana. As a senior, he threw for 577 yards and 7 touchdowns, and rushed for 579 yards and 9 touchdowns. As well as playing offense, Sams was also a major contributor on special teams, both as a punter and kick returner.

Sams received a 3 star rating by Rivals.com in the athlete category. He also made PrepStar magazine's All-Southeast Region team.

== College career ==
=== Kansas State ===
In 2011, his first year at Kansas State, Sams redshirted as a quarterback and did not see any playing time.

In 2012, Sams was the backup to Heisman candidate Collin Klein. He played in eight games, completing 6 of 8 passes for 55 yards and rushed 32 times for 252 yards and three touchdowns. Due to an injury to Klein, Sams saw significant playing time against Oklahoma State, completing 4 out of 5 passes for 45 yards. He currently holds the record for most rushing yardage by a freshman quarterback in school history.

In 2013, Sams competed for the starting job, but lost to JUCO transfer Jake Waters. He did, however, see limited playing time during the first few games of the year. This included extensive action against Oklahoma State, when he completed 15 out of 21 passes for 181 yards, and rushed 27 times for 118 yards.

=== McNeese State ===
On May 28, 2014, Sams announced that he would be transferring to McNeese State University.
