= Isame Faciane =

American gridiron football player (born 1991)

Profile
- Position: Guard

Personal information
- Born: May 11, 1991 (age 35); Slidell, Louisiana, U.S.
- Listed height: 6 ft 4 in (1.93 m)
- Listed weight: 302 lb (137 kg)

Career information
- High school: Slidell (LA) Salmen
- College: Florida International
- NFL draft: 2014: undrafted

Career history
- Minnesota Vikings (2014–2016)*; Buffalo Bills (2016)*; Miami Dolphins (2017)*; Iowa Barnstormers (2018); Toronto Argonauts (2018)*; Hamilton Tiger-Cats (2018); Houston Roughnecks (2020); Team 9 (2020)*; Houston Roughnecks (2020); Tucson Sugar Skulls (2021-2023)
- * Offseason or practice squad member only
- Stats at Pro Football Reference

Isame Faciane (born May 11, 1991) is an American football guard. He played college football as a defensive tackle at Florida International and was signed by the Minnesota Vikings as an undrafted free agent in 2014. He has also spent time with the Buffalo Bills, Miami Dolphins, Iowa Barnstormers, Toronto Argonauts, Hamilton Tiger-Cats, Houston Roughnecks, Team 9, and Tucson Sugar Skulls.

== Professional career ==
=== Minnesota Vikings ===
Faciane signed with the Minnesota Vikings as an undrafted free agent on May 10, 2014. Faciane chose the Vikings because the defensive line coach was Andre Patterson, his former assistant coach at Florida International. On August 30, 2014, he was waived by the Vikings and was signed to the practice squad the next day. He signed a reserve/future contract with the Vikings on December 30, 2014.

In 2015, Faciane made the transition from defensive tackle to offensive guard. On September 5, 2015, he was waived by the Vikings and signed to the practice squad the next day. He signed a reserve/future contract with the Vikings on January 11, 2016.

On September 3, 2016, Faciane was again released by the Vikings as part of final roster cuts and signed to the practice squad the next day. He was released on October 18, 2016, following a DWI arrest.

=== Buffalo Bills ===
On November 30, 2016, Faciane was signed to the Buffalo Bills' practice squad.

=== Miami Dolphins ===
On August 5, 2017, Faciane signed with the Miami Dolphins. He was waived on September 2, 2017, after making an attempt to transition to the guard position.

=== Iowa Barnstormers ===
On January 30, 2018, Faciane signed with the Iowa Barnstormers of the Indoor Football League.

=== Houston Roughnecks ===
In October 2019, Faciane was drafted by the XFL to play for the Houston Roughnecks. He was waived on February 19, 2020. He signed to the Team 9 practice squad, and then was re-signed by the Roughnecks on March 9, 2020. He had his contract terminated when the league suspended operations on April 10, 2020.
