= Chris Faulk =

American football player (born 1990)

Profile
- Position: Offensive tackle

Personal information
- Born: January 21, 1990 (age 36); Slidell, Louisiana, U.S.
- Listed height: 6 ft 6 in (1.98 m)
- Listed weight: 330 lb (150 kg)

Career information
- High school: Northshore (Slidell, Louisiana)
- College: LSU
- NFL draft: 2013: undrafted

Career history
- Cleveland Browns (2013)

Awards and highlights
- Second-team All-SEC (2011)
- Stats at Pro Football Reference

Christopher Brook Faulk (born January 21, 1990) is an American former football offensive tackle. He played high school football at Northshore High School in Slidell, Louisiana and college football at LSU. He played in the 2009 U.S. Army All-American Bowl.

== College career ==
Faulk started 16 of 26 games during his career. He missed all but one game of his junior season due to a knee injury.

Faulk entered the 2013 NFL draft after his junior season.

== Professional career ==
Pre-draft measurables
Height	Weight	Arm length	Hand span	Bench press
6 ft 5 1/2 in (1.97 m)	331 lb (150 kg)	34 1/4 in (0.87 m)	9 5/8 in (0.24 m)	25 reps
All values from NFL Combine

On July 28, 2014, the Browns waived Faulk after spending the 2013 NFL season on injury reserve after knee surgery
