= Covington High School (Covington, Louisiana) =

Covington High School (CHS)

Location
- 73030 Lion Drive; Covington, Louisiana 70433; United States; 30.493617°N 90.133412°W

Information
- Type: Public
- Established: 1913
- School district: St. Tammany Parish Public Schools
- Category: High School
- Principal: John Boudreaux
- Faculty: 107 (2022–23)
- Grades: 9–12
- Enrollment: 1,690 (2023–2024)
- Student to teacher ratio: 15.35 (2023–2024)
- Colors: Navy and Old gold
- Athletics: Yes
- Mascot: Lion
- Nickname: Lions
- Yearbook: Lions Lines
- Website: http://covingtonhigh.stpsb.org/

Covington High School is a public high school in Covington, Louisiana, United States. It is one of the Saint Tammany Parish Public Schools.

The school serves residents of Covington, Folsom, Sun, and some unincorporated areas in western St. Tammany Parish, including Bush and Lee Road.

== 2021 Social Media Incident ==
Covington High School received attention in 2021 after a student attacked a teacher unprovoked while a friend recorded the incident via cell phone video, allegedly as part of a TikTok challenge to slap a teacher. The teacher was 64 years old and disabled.

== Athletics ==
Covington High athletics competes in the LHSAA, and offers a variety of athletic opportunity for students.

=== Championships ===
Football championships

- (1) State Championship: 1976

=== Football ===
Coaches

- Joseph "Jack" Salter - LHSAA Hall of Fame head football coach, Jack Salter, was head coach at Covington High from 1963 to 1995. During his thirty-three seasons at the school, he compiled a 256–110–8 record and won fifteen district championships, won a state championship in 1976 along with state runners-up in 1975, 1981 and 1987. The Covington High football stadium is named after Salter.

=== Athletic Opportunity ===
As of the 2022-23 school year, Covington High School offered the following sports:

- Baseball
- Basketball (Male and female; Varsity and JV)
- Cheerleading
- Cross Country
- Football (Male; Varsity and JV)
- Golf
- Band
- Powerlifting
- Soccer (Male and female)
- Softball
- Swim
- Tennis
- Track
- Volleyball
- Wrestling

== Alma Mater ==
The Covington High School Alma Mater is always played by the CHS Marching Lions, usually being directed by a band director or a drum major.

"Close behind the stately poplars stands Covington High. Our hearts that fondly love thee as the years go by. Proud art thou of all thy beauty on thy noble way. May the watchwords Honor, Duty lead us on for aye."

== Notable alumni ==
- Vincent Alexander, former NFL player
- Curt Baham, former NFL player
- Edgerrin Cooper, NFL linebacker for the Green Bay Packers
- Jerry Davis, former NFL player
- Mason Estrada, baseball pitcher for the Los Angeles Dodgers organization
- Dave Fortman, music producer, guitarist for the band Ugly Kid Joe
- Clay Higgins, law enforcement officer, member of the United States House of Representatives for Louisiana's 3rd congressional district
- Tramain Jacobs, New York Giants NFL player
- Otha Peters, former NFL player
- Blake Stein, former MLB player (Oakland Athletics, Kansas City Royals)
- Gene Sykes, former NFL player
- Lauren Turner, singer/songwriter, American Idol season 10 contestant
- Mike Williams, former NFL player
- Theo Von, comedian
