= Slidell, Louisiana =

Slidell
- City
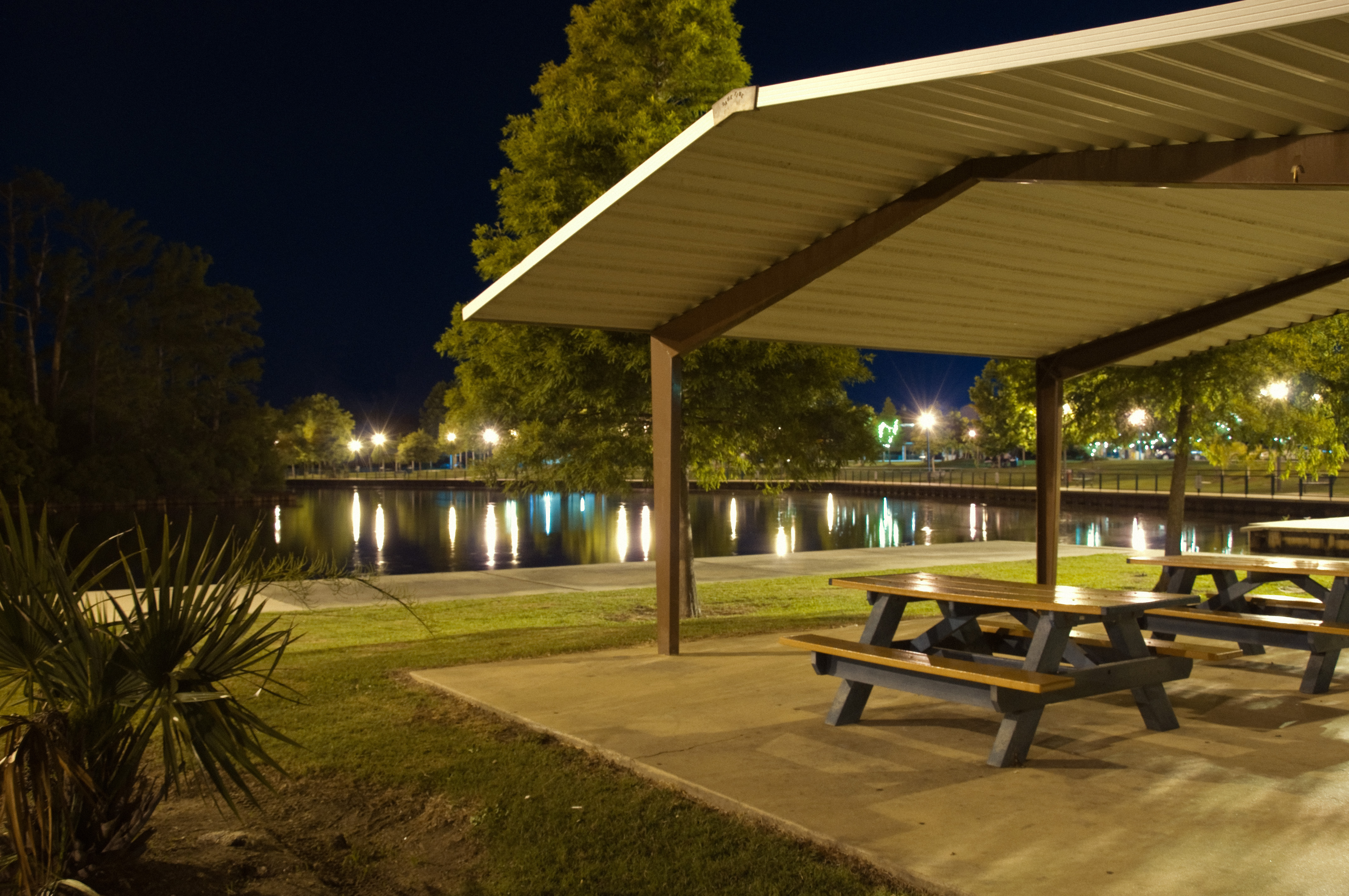
- Heritage Park
- Nicknames: The Camellia City (official), The Dell, The Dirty Dell (Owing to graffiti above I-12 East before the city limits)
- Location of Slidell in St. Tammany Parish, Louisiana

- Location of Slidell in Louisiana
- Coordinates: 30°16′45″N 89°46′40″W
- Country: United States
- State: Louisiana
- Parish: St. Tammany
- Named for: John Slidell

Government
  - Mayor: Randy Fandal (R)

Area
  - Total: 15.38 sq mi (39.83 km^{2})
  - Land: 15.04 sq mi (38.96 km^{2})
  - Water: 0.34 sq mi (0.87 km^{2})

Population (2020)
  - Total: 28,781
  - Density: 1,913.5/sq mi (738.82/km^{2})
- Time zone: UTC−6 (CST)
  - Summer (DST): UTC−5 (CDT)
- ZIP Codes: 70458–70461, 70469
- Area code(s): 985
- FIPS code: 22-70805
- Website: myslidell.com

Slidell /slaɪˈdɛl/ is a city on the northeast shore of Lake Pontchartrain in St. Tammany Parish, Louisiana, United States. Its population was 28,781 at the 2020 census, making it the 16th-most-populous city in Louisiana. It is part of the New Orleans−Metairie−Kenner metropolitan statistical area.

== History ==
=== Beginning ===
One of the earlier settlers to the area was Foster Willie. Along with a younger brother, Wesley Coke Asbury Gause, Judge Wingate, and several others, he left Shallotte, North Carolina, on February 18 and arrived at Pearlington, Mississippi, on April 14, 1836. Wesley and his family remained there, while John and family crossed the Pearl River and built a log cabin on the west bank, a little further south. He then began a lumber mill in the fledgling town later known as Slidell. His traveling back and forth from lumber yard to home created a road known today as Gause Boulevard, a major east–west street in the town. The lumber yard was where Gause Boulevard crosses the railroad track. The log cabin was built at the east end of the road, just a few yards from the river. The house stood until the late 1990s, and a small family burial plot still remains where John is buried between his two wives, Lydia Russ and Johanna Frederica VanHeemskerk.

Slidell was founded on the north shore of Lake Pontchartrain in 1882 and 1883 during construction of the New Orleans and Northeastern Railroad. The rail line connected New Orleans to Meridian, Mississippi. The town was named in honor of American politician and Confederate ambassador to France John Slidell, and it was officially chartered by the Louisiana State Legislature in 1888.

=== 20th century and beyond ===
Around 1910, Slidell began a period of economic and industrial growth. A large creosote plant was built, and Slidell became home to the Fritz Salmen Brickyard, a major producer of bricks later named St. Joe Brick. A lumber mill and shipyard were also built. Following the construction of Interstate 10, Interstate 59, and Interstate 12, Slidell became a major crossroads for those traversing the Gulf States.

In 1915, the creosote plant burned to the ground. The plant was rebuilt on Bayou Lane, closer to a water source and a fire station. Eventually, creosote polluted the bayou, a source of drinking water for many of Slidell's residents. The creosote plant was abandoned in 1986 and became an EPA Superfund site. The canal was dredged and waste incinerated until completion of the cleanup in the 1990s. At that time, a boat launch was built and Heritage Park was constructed on the former site.

With the advent of the U.S. space program in the 1960s, NASA opened the Michoud Assembly Facility in New Orleans, the John C. Stennis Space Center in nearby Hancock County, Mississippi, and a NASA computer center on Gause Boulevard. This nearly tripled Slidell's population over 10 years, and the city became a major suburb of New Orleans. The National Weather Service forecast office for the New Orleans and Baton Rouge area is also in Slidell. Slidell is the headquarters of Vesco Tennis Courts, a privately held firm specializing in construction of hard surfaces for outdoor sports facilities.

The city has hosted several parade krewes each Carnival season.

On August 29, 2005, Slidell suffered extensive damage from Hurricane Katrina, as the storm made final landfall on the morning of August 29, 2005. The municipal area is about 2 miles (3 km) inland, and parts of the city experienced a storm surge in excess of 10 feet (3.0 m). The unincorporated areas of St. Tammany Parish, to the south and east, often called Slidell, experienced a storm surge of 13 to 16 feet (4.0 to 4.9 m).

On April 20, 2011, an Amtrak train derailed in Slidell, which injured six people.

On April 10, 2024, the 2024 Slidell tornado struck through the southern portion of the city.

The city received 7 inches of snow during the January 20–22, 2025 Gulf Coast blizzard.

=== Slidell Museum ===
The Slidell Museum is a small museum that highlights the founding of the city as a railroad town. Located in Old Town Slidell on 1st Street, the museum is open Tuesday through Saturday. Admission is free to the public.

== Geography ==
Slidell is located at 30°16′45″N 89°46′40″W (30.279040, -89.777744), and has an elevation of 13 feet (4.0 m). It is in southeastern St. Tammany Parish, located about 3 miles (5 km) north of Lake Pontchartrain. The city forms part of the Greater New Orleans area. According to the United States Census Bureau, the city has a total area of 15.2 square miles (39.4 km^{2}), of which 0.35 sq mi (0.9 km^{2}), or 2.39%, is covered by water.

=== Climate ===
Slidell has a humid subtropical climate, with short, generally mild winters (slightly cooler than the southshore part of the New Orleans area) and hot, humid summers. Precipitation in winter usually accompanies the passage of a cold front. Hurricanes pose a threat to the area, and the city is vulnerable because of its low elevation.

Climate data for Slidell, Louisiana (1991–2020 normals, extremes 1956–present)
Month	Jan	Feb	Mar	Apr	May	Jun	Jul	Aug	Sep	Oct	Nov	Dec	Year
Record high °F (°C)	81 (27)	86 (30)	89 (32)	92 (33)	95 (35)	104 (40)	104 (40)	108 (42)	99 (37)	94 (34)	90 (32)	86 (30)	104 (40)
Mean maximum °F (°C)	75.1 (23.9)	77.1 (25.1)	81.5 (27.5)	84.4 (29.1)	90.1 (32.3)	93.5 (34.2)	95.2 (35.1)	95.0 (35.0)	93.0 (33.9)	88.6 (31.4)	81.7 (27.6)	77.1 (25.1)	96.2 (35.7)
Mean daily maximum °F (°C)	60.6 (15.9)	64.3 (17.9)	70.1 (21.2)	76.1 (24.5)	83.0 (28.3)	88.2 (31.2)	89.6 (32.0)	89.7 (32.1)	86.7 (30.4)	79.3 (26.3)	69.7 (20.9)	63.0 (17.2)	76.7 (24.8)
Daily mean °F (°C)	51.1 (10.6)	54.7 (12.6)	60.8 (16.0)	66.9 (19.4)	74.4 (23.6)	80.1 (26.7)	81.7 (27.6)	81.6 (27.6)	78.2 (25.7)	69.2 (20.7)	59.5 (15.3)	53.5 (11.9)	67.6 (19.8)
Mean daily minimum °F (°C)	41.6 (5.3)	45.0 (7.2)	51.6 (10.9)	57.7 (14.3)	65.7 (18.7)	72.1 (22.3)	73.8 (23.2)	73.5 (23.1)	69.7 (20.9)	59.2 (15.1)	49.2 (9.6)	44.1 (6.7)	58.6 (14.8)
Mean minimum °F (°C)	24.9 (−3.9)	29.3 (−1.5)	33.3 (0.7)	40.9 (4.9)	51.4 (10.8)	64.4 (18.0)	68.9 (20.5)	67.9 (19.9)	58.1 (14.5)	42.0 (5.6)	32.3 (0.2)	28.7 (−1.8)	23.6 (−4.7)
Record low °F (°C)	8 (−13)	15 (−9)	22 (−6)	32 (0)	41 (5)	50 (10)	57 (14)	58 (14)	42 (6)	31 (−1)	24 (−4)	9 (−13)	8 (−13)
Average precipitation inches (mm)	5.92 (150)	4.39 (112)	5.26 (134)	5.47 (139)	5.84 (148)	5.75 (146)	7.68 (195)	7.57 (192)	4.95 (126)	4.17 (106)	4.22 (107)	4.95 (126)	66.17 (1,681)
Average snowfall inches (cm)	0.0 (0.0)	0.0 (0.0)	0.1 (0.25)	0.0 (0.0)	0.0 (0.0)	0.0 (0.0)	0.0 (0.0)	0.0 (0.0)	0.0 (0.0)	0.0 (0.0)	0.0 (0.0)	0.0 (0.0)	0.1 (0.25)
Average precipitation days (≥ 0.01 in)	10.5	9.2	9.0	7.8	7.5	11.2	13.7	13.9	9.6	7.0	7.5	10.2	117.1
Average snowy days (≥ 0.1 in)	0.0	0.0	0.0	0.0	0.0	0.0	0.0	0.0	0.0	0.0	0.0	0.0	0.0
Source: NOAA

== Demographics ==
Historical population
Census	Pop.	Note	%±
1890	364		—
1900	1,129		210.2%
1910	2,188		93.8%
1920	2,958		35.2%
1930	2,807		−5.1%
1940	2,822		0.5%
1950	3,383		19.9%
1960	6,356		87.9%
1970	16,101		153.3%
1980	26,718		65.9%
1990	24,124		−9.7%
2000	25,695		6.5%
2010	27,068		5.3%
2020	28,781		6.3%
2025 (est.)	28,341	▼	−1.5%
U.S. Decennial Census

Slidell racial composition as of 2020
Race	Number	Percentage
White (non-Hispanic)	17,398	60.45%
Black or African American (non-Hispanic)	6,815	23.68%
Native American	135	0.47%
Asian	505	1.75%
Pacific Islander	14	0.05%
Other/multiracial	1,526	5.3%
Hispanic or Latino	2,388	8.3%

As of the 2020 United States census, 28,781 people, 9,818 households, and 6,430 families were residing in the city. At the 2010 United States census, 27,068 people, 10,050 households, and 7,145 families resided in Slidell. In 2000, the population was 25,695.

According to the 2019 American Community Survey, the U.S. Census Bureau estimated the racial and ethnic makeup of the city as 71.8% non-Hispanic White, 16.9% Black and African American, 0.5% American Indian and Alaska Native, 1.3% Asian, 0.1% some other race, 2.3% two or more races, and 7.1% Hispanic and Latin American of any race. In 2010, the racial makeup of the city was 76.0% White, 17.0% Black and African American, 0.5% Native American, 1.6% Asian, 0.0% Pacific Islander, 2.7% from other races, and 2.3% from two or more races. Hispanics and Latin Americans of any race were 6.3% of the population. At the 2000 U.S. census, the racial and ethnic makeup of the city was 83.13% White, 13.56% African American, 0.49% Native American, 0.72% Asian, 0.05% Pacific Islander, 0.62% from other races, and 1.43% from two or more races; Hispanics and Latin Americans of any race were 2.67% of the population.

Of the population in 2019, the median age was 36.7 and 73.2% of the population were 18 and older; an estimated 15.9% of the population were 65 and older. Residents of Slidell had a median household income of $54,906 and 15.1% of the population lived at or below the poverty line. Males had a median full-time annual income of $54,642 versus $37,183 for females. Of the 10,050 households in 2010, 31.6% had children under 18 living with them, 48.9% were married couples living together, 16.2% had a female householder with no husband present, and 28.9% were not families. About 23.4% of households were one person, and 9.4% were one person 65 or older. The average household size was 2.66, and the average family size was 3.13. In 2010, the age distribution was 28.0% under 19, 6% from 20 to 24, 26% from 25 to 44, 26.1% from 45 to 64, and 14% were 65 or older. The median age was 37.3 years. For every 100 females, there were 94.1 males.

== Economy ==
Slidell is the global headquarters for automotive manufacturer and military contractor Textron Marine & Land Systems off Gause Boulevard.

== Education ==
Slidell's public schools are operated by the St. Tammany Parish Public Schools, which covers all of the parish. There are three public high schools located in Slidell: Northshore High School; Salmen High School; and Slidell High School. Pearl River High School, located in nearby Pearl River, serves a small section of Slidell. There are two private high schools located in Slidell: Pope John Paul II High School and First Baptist Christian School.

The main campus of Northshore Technical Community College is located in Lacombe. This campus was established in January 2017. Also, Nunez Community College in Chalmette and the Sidney Collier Campus of Delgado Community College in New Orleans East are in close proximity to the city.

Previously, the Slidell Learning Center and later the Northshore-Slidell campus were in the city, and Covington had the Northshore-Covington Campus. The latter opened in summer 2002. The Slidell campus closed in 2016 due to financial issues.

== Transportation ==
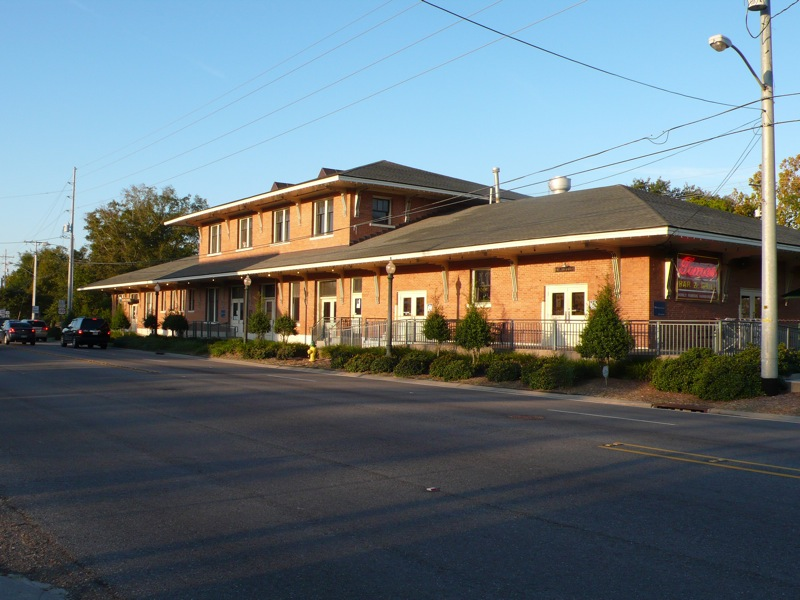
The train station on Front Street

Amtrak's Crescent serves Slidell station, and offers service to New York City, Washington, D.C., Atlanta, Birmingham, New Orleans, and intermediate points. The station is located on Front Street in Olde Towne Slidell.

Slidell is on the southwest corner of the intersection of Interstate 10, Interstate 12, Interstate 59, and U.S. Highway 11. The I-10 Twin Span Bridge runs from Slidell to New Orleans East across Lake Pontchartrain.

Slidell Airport (ICAO: KASD, FAA LID: ASD) is a city-owned, public-use airport about 4 nautical miles (7 km) northwest of Slidell's central business district. Although most U.S. airports use the same three-letter location identifier for the FAA and IATA, Slidell's is assigned ASD by the FAA but has no designation from the IATA (which assigned ASD to Andros Town Airport in the Bahamas).

== Notable people ==
- Brett Bech, former NFL wide receiver; played football at Slidell High School
- John Besh, chef and owner of Restaurant August and Luke; finalist on the Food Network show Iron Chef America
- Terreal Bierria, former NFL safety; played football at Salmen High School
- Clarence "Gatemouth" Brown, Grammy Award-winning instrumentalist
- Kalani Brown (born 1997), player in the WNBA
- P. J. Brown, NBA player
- Tony Canzoneri, world boxing champion
- Arthur Chevrolet, co-founder of the automobile company that bears his name and participant in the inaugural Indianapolis 500
- Rich Clementi, mixed martial arts fighter and UFC and Bellator MMA veteran who trains and resides in Slidell
- Chris Duhon, former Duke University and NBA point guard; played basketball at Salmen High School
- Isame Faciane, former NFL player and indoor football player for the Tucson Sugar Skulls; played football at Salmen High School
- Chris Faulk, former NFL offensive tackle; played football at Northshore High School
- Michael Federico, college baseball coach; played baseball at Pope John Paul II Catholic High School
- Mike Fontenot, MLB infielder; played at Salmen High School and LSU
- Matt Forte, NFL running back; played at Tulane University in New Orleans and at Slidell High School
- Will Harris, MLB pitcher, former LSU infielder, played baseball at Slidell High School.
- Rodney Holman, former tight end for Cincinnati Bengals and Detroit Lions
- Arthur Jones, inventor, TV producer, adventurer and animal trapper.
- Juvenile, Southern rapper
- Ronnie Kole, world-famous pianist
- LaRon Landry, strong safety for the Washington Commanders and LSU
- Paul Mauffray, conductor
- Logan Morrison, former outfielder for the Seattle Mariners, Miami Marlins, and Tampa Bay Rays, currently in the Philadelphia Phillies organization; played baseball at Northshore High School
- Xavier Paul, former outfielder for seven MLB teams, most recently with the Philadelphia Phillies
- John Perkins, member of the Crew-Cuts, a vocal pop group most famous for their songs "Earth Angel" and "Sh-Boom"
- Daniel Sams, former McNeese State starting quarterback; played football at Salmen High School
- Nan Zhang, actress
