= Pearl River High School (Louisiana) =

Location
- 39110 Rebel Lane; Pearl River, St. Tammany Parish, Louisiana 70452; United States; 30.37036°N 89.75663°W

Information
- Type: Public
- Established: August 1968
- School district: St. Tammany Parish Public Schools
- Principal: Trece Jordan-Larsen
- Teaching staff: 59.22 (FTE)
- Grades: 9–12
- Enrollment: 861 (2023–2024)
- Student to teacher ratio: 14.54
- Schedule: 7:30am - 2:46pm
- Campus: Rural
- Colors: Red, White
- Mascot: The Colonel (former), Rebel (current)
- Nickname: Rebels
- Website: pearlriverhigh.stpsb.org

Pearl River High School is a high school in Pearl River, Louisiana, United States, operated by the St. Tammany Parish School Board.

In addition to Pearl River it serves a small section of Slidell.

== History ==
=== Beginnings ===
Milton Craddock's first campaign for the St. Tammany Parish School Board, Ward 8, included his dream for a high school in this area. Students from as far away as Talisheek were dropping out of school because it was a hardship in time and resources to attend Slidell High. Craddock was elected, and within his first six-year term a one wing Pearl River High School was erected on Taylor Drive. The street was so named because in April 1966, Mr. Albert Taylor (1908 - 1982) and his wife, Mildred (1909 - 1989) sold 30.06 acres (121,600 m^{2}) of land to the School Board for $60,120.00 as a site for the new school. Craddock was helped by Sixth Ward Board Member "Siggy" Halverson, and in 1968 the school was completed. The school began with tenth grade, and added a grade each year until the first class graduated in 1971. There were about 42 graduates.

The high school begun the two-year renovation process in March 2016 by adding three new tennis courts. Renovation continued until December 2017. At completion, the school boasts a new mall-like hallway spanning the front of the school, renovations to the 1st and 2nd halls for the first time in nearly 30 years, as well as renovations to the gymnasium lobby and cafetorium. The school also added signage to the outside of the new building welcoming students. The school also went a renumbering of the halls.

=== Administration and Curriculum ===
From 1968 to 1981, Ewell L. Rowley was principal. A former agriculture teacher, he was charged with the difficult task of opening the school and guiding it during its formative years.

In summer 1981, Lawrence F. "Moose" Matulich, a former mathematics teacher and head football coach, was named the second principal. Mr. Matulich's daughter, Mary Lou Jordan, served as the Principal of Riverside Elementary School in Pearl River from 1992 to her retirement in June 2018.

Louis Austin was appointed the third principal in 1987 and, like Rowley, he was a former agriculture teacher.

Ronald "Ron" Styron became Pearl River's principal in 1992, having been assistant principal under Austin. He began a program incorporating principles of site-based management which included greater decision-making on the part of the faculty and staff.

Karen M. DeVillier was named Pearl River's first female principal and stayed from 1998 to 2003.

PRHS has been led by principal Michael E. Winkler since 2003. In 2010, he was given the 'Principal of the Year' award for St. Tammany Parish. He retired from the post of Principal on June 14, 2018. John Priola, former principal at Boyet Junior High in Slidell, Louisiana was the school's principal in May 2018 until June 2021, with Trece Jordan-Larsen becoming the current principal

Pearl River's strong elective program, including vocational courses, complemented a full range of traditional academic subjects. In 1985, the Board of Elementary and Secondary Education changed the diploma requirements, which triggered a curricular shift to one of a college preparatory nature.

Because of the increase in the number of credits needed for a diploma and the type of academic requirements, it became necessary in 1988 to move from a six-period to a seven-period day. This extra credit per school year afforded students a greater chance of graduating within the usual four year time frame. The school still runs of a seven-period day with two lunches due to construction during the 2016-2017 and 2017-2018 school years. It also stimulated curricular expansion which included classes such as speech, newspaper, yearbook, psychology, twentieth century American history, gifted and talented, AP Calculus and a multitude of dual-enrollment courses.

As the population of at-risk students increased parish-wide, so did the number of programs aimed at meeting their needs. Career Opportunity Preparation Education (COPE), Focus on Youth (FOCUS), and Technical Instruction of Mainstreamed Students (TIMS), are some of the major initiatives to address the special concerns of this new student population.

== Athletics ==
Pearl River High athletics competes in the LHSAA.
