= Mandeville, Louisiana =

City in the United States

- City
- City of Mandeville
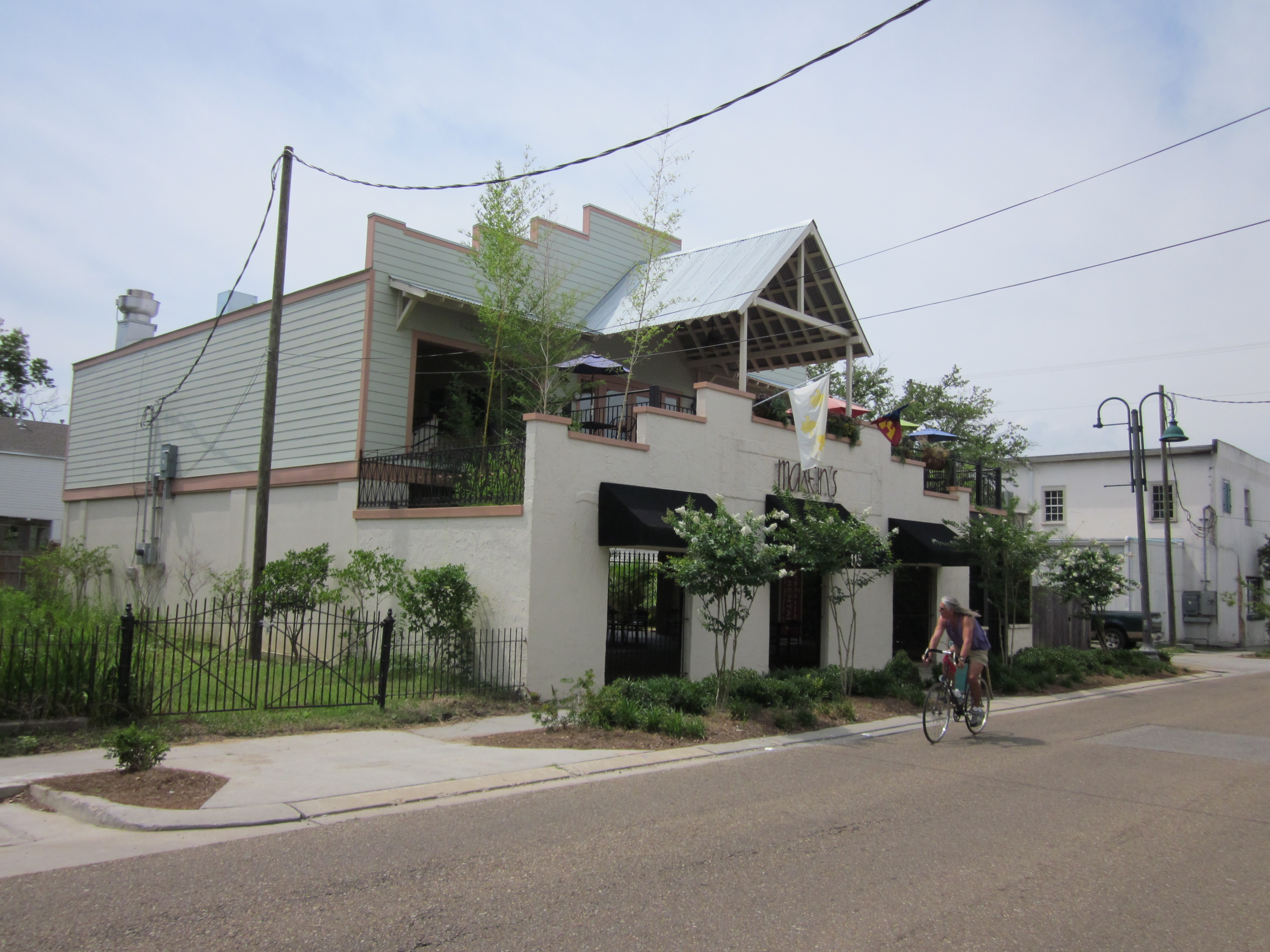

- Location of Mandeville in St. Tammany Parish, Louisiana

- Location of Louisiana in the contiguous United States
- Coordinates: 30°22′09″N 90°04′41″W
- Country: United States
- State: Louisiana
- Parish: St. Tammany
- Founded: 1834
- Incorporated: 1840
- Founder: Bernard de Marigny
- Named for: Jean-Bernard Xavier Philippe de Marigny de Mandeville

Government
  - Mayor: Harrison Bawsinger (R)

Area
  - Total: 7.29 sq mi (18.87 km^{2})
  - Land: 7.12 sq mi (18.44 km^{2})
  - Water: 0.16 sq mi (0.42 km^{2})
- Elevation: 7 ft (2.1 m)

Population (2020)
  - Total: 13,192
  - Density: 1,852.4/sq mi (715.21/km^{2})
- Time zone: UTC-6 (CST)
  - Summer (DST): UTC-5 (CDT)
- ZIP codes: 70448, 70471, 70433
- Area code: 985
- FIPS code: 22-48225
- Website: www.cityofmandeville.com

Mandeville is a city in St. Tammany Parish, Louisiana, United States. The city was founded in 1834 and incorporated in 1840. As of the 2020 United States census, its population was 13,192. Mandeville is located on the north shore of Lake Pontchartrain, south of Interstate 12. It is located directly across the lake from the city of New Orleans and its southshore suburbs. Mandeville is part of the New Orleans-Metairie metropolitan statistical area.

== History ==
In 1829, Bernard Xavier de Marigny de Mandeville (1785–1868), a New Orleans planter and legislator whose family was among the most prominent in Louisiana, purchased a large tract on the north shore east of Bayou Castine and established there a plantation he named Fontainebleau, on the site of the present Fontainebleau State Park. The tract had been granted to earlier settlers under British and Spanish rule, and Congress confirmed Marigny's title to it by a private act of March 15, 1832. In 1834, Marigny laid out a town on his lands west of the bayou and sold lots at auction in New Orleans, promoting it as a resort for city residents across the lake. Mandeville was incorporated as a town in 1840. It became a popular summer destination for well-to-do New Orleanians wishing to escape the city's heat.

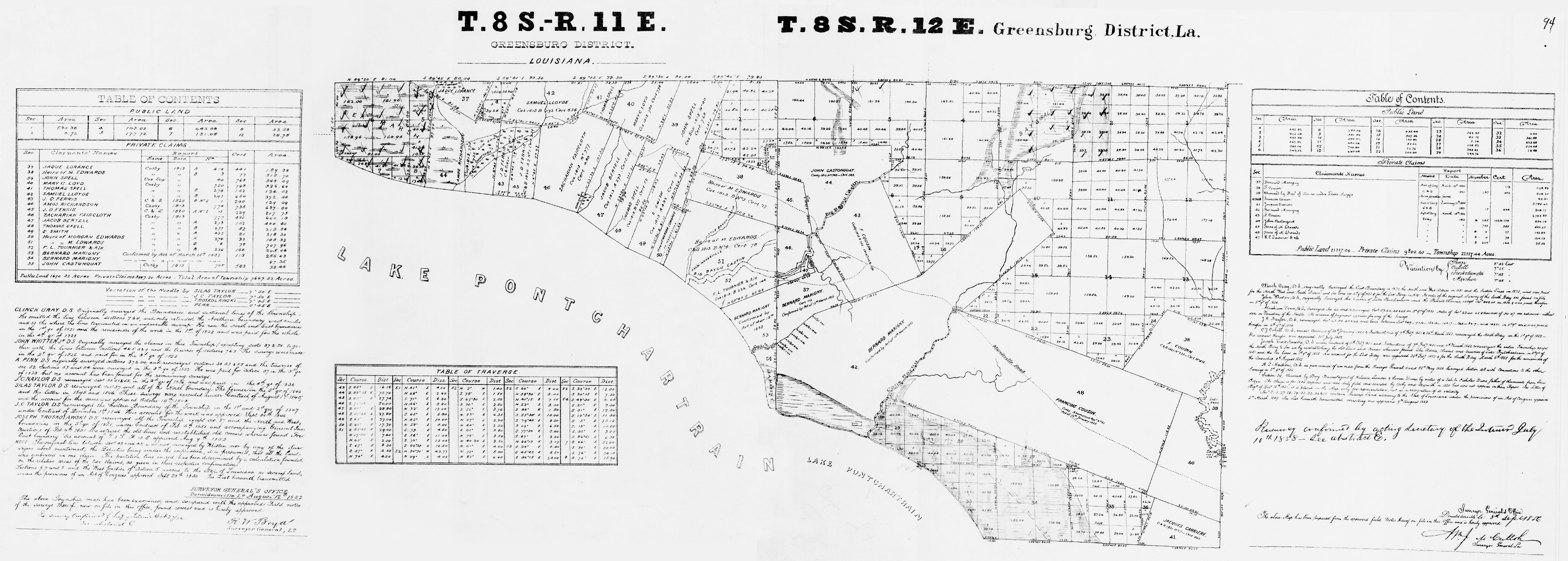
Composite of the 1852 and 1856 federal township plats covering Mandeville, showing the private land claims along Lake Pontchartrain, Bayou Castin, and the sections confirmed to Bernard Marigny in 1832.

In the mid-19th century, regular daily steamboat traffic between New Orleans and Mandeville began, and by the end of the Victorian era, it had become a popular weekend destination of the New Orleans middle class, as well. In the late 19th century, Mandeville was home of the Harvey School (Mandeville), a college preparatory institution.

From 1909 to 1918, the St. Tammany and New Orleans Railways and Ferry Company, an interurban railway known locally as the Motor Road, connected the Mandeville lakefront steamship pier with Abita Springs and Covington; its powerhouse also supplied the town's electric street lighting until the line was scrapped in 1918.

In 1956, the first span of the Lake Pontchartrain Causeway opened to automobile traffic. A second span was added in 1969. The new road spurred the growth of Mandeville and the surrounding area as an exurban community for people working in New Orleans. This trend increased in the 1980s and 1990s, further integrating Mandeville into the greater New Orleans metropolitan area.

Mandeville's low-lying lakefront is protected by a 5-foot (1.5 m) seawall, and the blocks nearest the lake have flooded repeatedly during storm surges. Hurricane Katrina in 2005 flooded hundreds of buildings; after further surges from Isaac in 2012 and Hurricane Ida in 2021, the city's building-elevation and floodplain regulations sharply reduced repeat losses.

== Geography ==
According to the United States Census Bureau, the city has a total area of 6.8 square miles (17.7 km^{2}), of which 0.12 square miles (0.3 km^{2}), or 1.55%, is covered by water.

The Tchefuncte River flows through Madisonville, and a manned swing bridge connects Mandeville to Madisonville.

Mandeville is located at 30°22′9″N 90°5′42″W. The city's ZIP codes include 70448 and 70471.

== Demographics ==
Historical population
Census	Pop.	Note	%±
1870	541		—
1880	753		39.2%
1890	1,012		34.4%
1900	1,029		1.7%
1910	1,166		13.3%
1920	1,130		−3.1%
1930	1,069		−5.4%
1940	1,326		24.0%
1950	1,368		3.2%
1960	1,740		27.2%
1970	2,571		47.8%
1980	6,076		136.3%
1990	7,083		16.6%
2000	10,489		48.1%
2010	11,560		10.2%
2020	13,192		14.1%
2025 (est.)	12,918	▼	−2.1%
U.S. Decennial Census

The 2020 census by the United States Census Bureau determined 13,192 people lived in Mandeville. The racial and ethnic makeup at the 2019 American Community Survey was 90.2% non-Hispanic white, 2.8% Black and African American, 2.8% Asian, 0.2% some other race, 0.4% two or more races, and 3.6% Hispanic and Latin American of any race.

At the 2000 United States census, 10,489 people, 4,204 households, and 2,724 families were residing in the city. The population density was 1,543.1 inhabitants per square mile (595.8/km^{2}). There were 4,669 housing units with an average density of 686.9/sq mi (265.1/km^{2}). The racial makeup of the city was 92.15% White, 4.79% Black and African American, 0.31% Native American, 1.16% Asian, 0.06% Pacific Islander, 0.59% from other races, and 0.93% from two or more races. Hispanic or Latin American people of any race were 2.43% of the population.

In 2000, of the 4,204 households, 30.6% had children under 18 living with them, 50.6% were married couples living together, 10.8% had a female householder with no husband present, and 35.2% were not families. About 29.8% of all households were made up of individuals, and 11.4% had someone living alone who was 65 years of age or older. The average household size was 2.46, and the average family size was 3.11. In the city, the population was spread out, with 27.3% under the age of 18, 7.3% from 18 to 24, 28.9% from 25 to 44, 24.5% from 45 to 64, and 11.9% who were 65 years of age or older. The median age was 38 years. For every 100 females, there were approximately 89.2 males. For every 100 females age 18 and over, there were about 84.7 males. At the 2019 American Community Survey, the median age was 43.7 and 77.0% of the population were aged 18 and older; 18.3% of the population were aged 65 and older.

In 2019, the median household income was $72,989 and males had a median income of $76,573 versus $50,707 for females. In 2000, median income for a household in the city was $52,500, and the median income for a family was $70,043. Males had a median income of $50,891 versus $30,554 for females. The per capita income for the city was $26,420. About 4.9% of families and 7.6% of the population were below the poverty line, including 7.1% of those under age 18 and 13.7% of those age 65 or over.

== Arts and culture ==
- The Seven Sisters Oak in Mandeville is the largest certified southern live oak tree.

=== Music ===
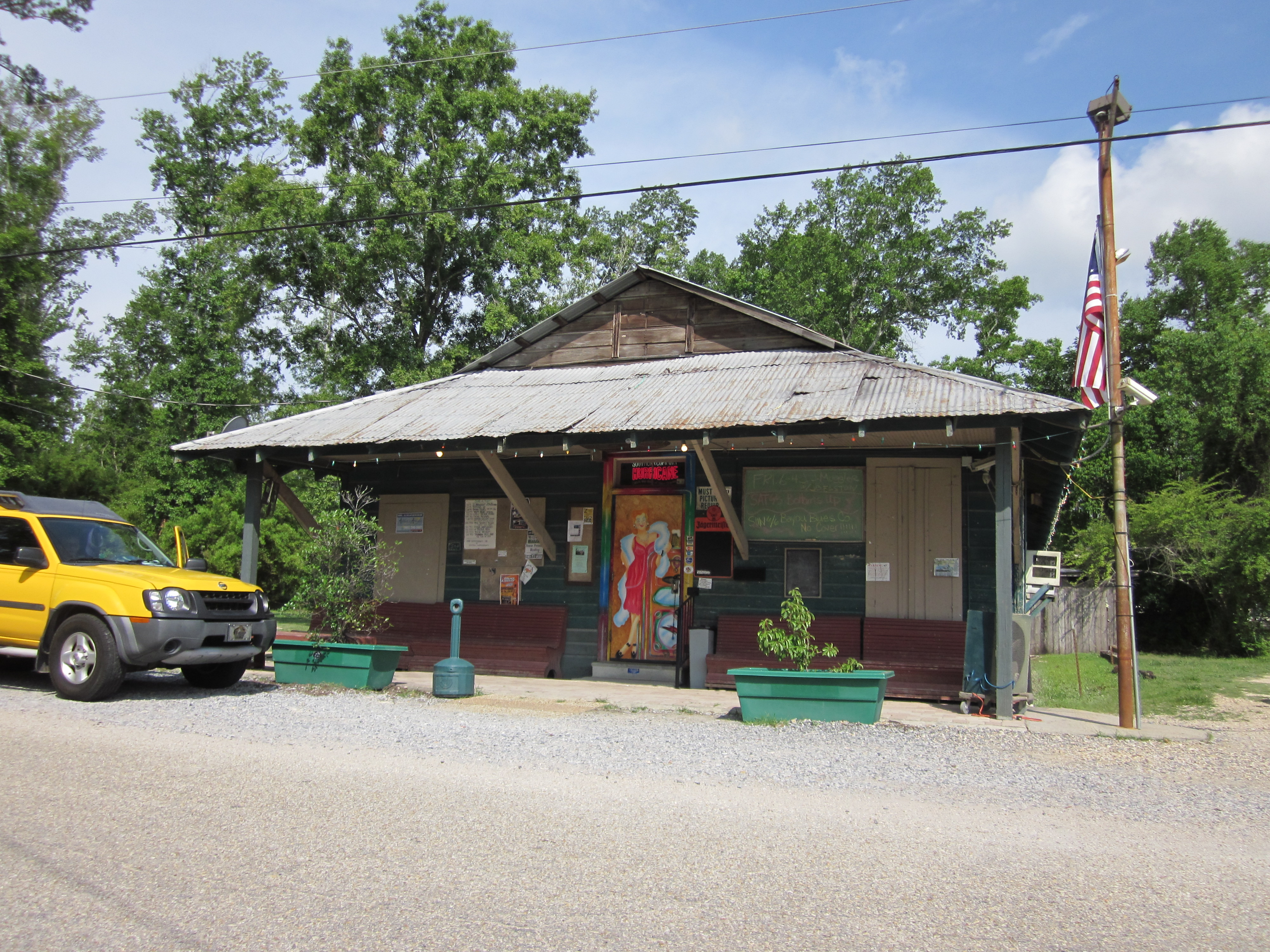
Ruby's Roadhouse

Bands played music on the steamboats crossing the lake and at pavilions and dance halls in Mandeville, and the town became one of the first places where the new "jazz" music was heard outside of New Orleans. Bunk Johnson, Buddy Petit, Papa Celestin, George Lewis, Kid Ory, Edmond Hall, Chester Zardis, and many other early jazz artists regularly played in Mandeville. Two buildings from early jazz history still stand in Mandeville. Ruby's Roadhouse has been in continuous operation since the 1920s (formerly Buck's Brown Derby and Ruby's Rendezvous) and is still a popular bar and live music venue today. The Dew Drop Social and Benevolent Hall, listed on the National Register of Historic Places, was built in 1895 by an African-American mutual aid society founded in Mandeville on May 5, 1885, and is one of four known surviving African-American benevolent association halls in south Louisiana outside New Orleans. It was the center of Black social life in the town, hosting dances at which Buddy Petit, Bunk Johnson and Kid Ory played, until its decline around 1940; the association disbanded in 1980, and the city bought the building in 2000 and reopened it as the Dew Drop Jazz and Social Hall.

== Parks and recreation ==
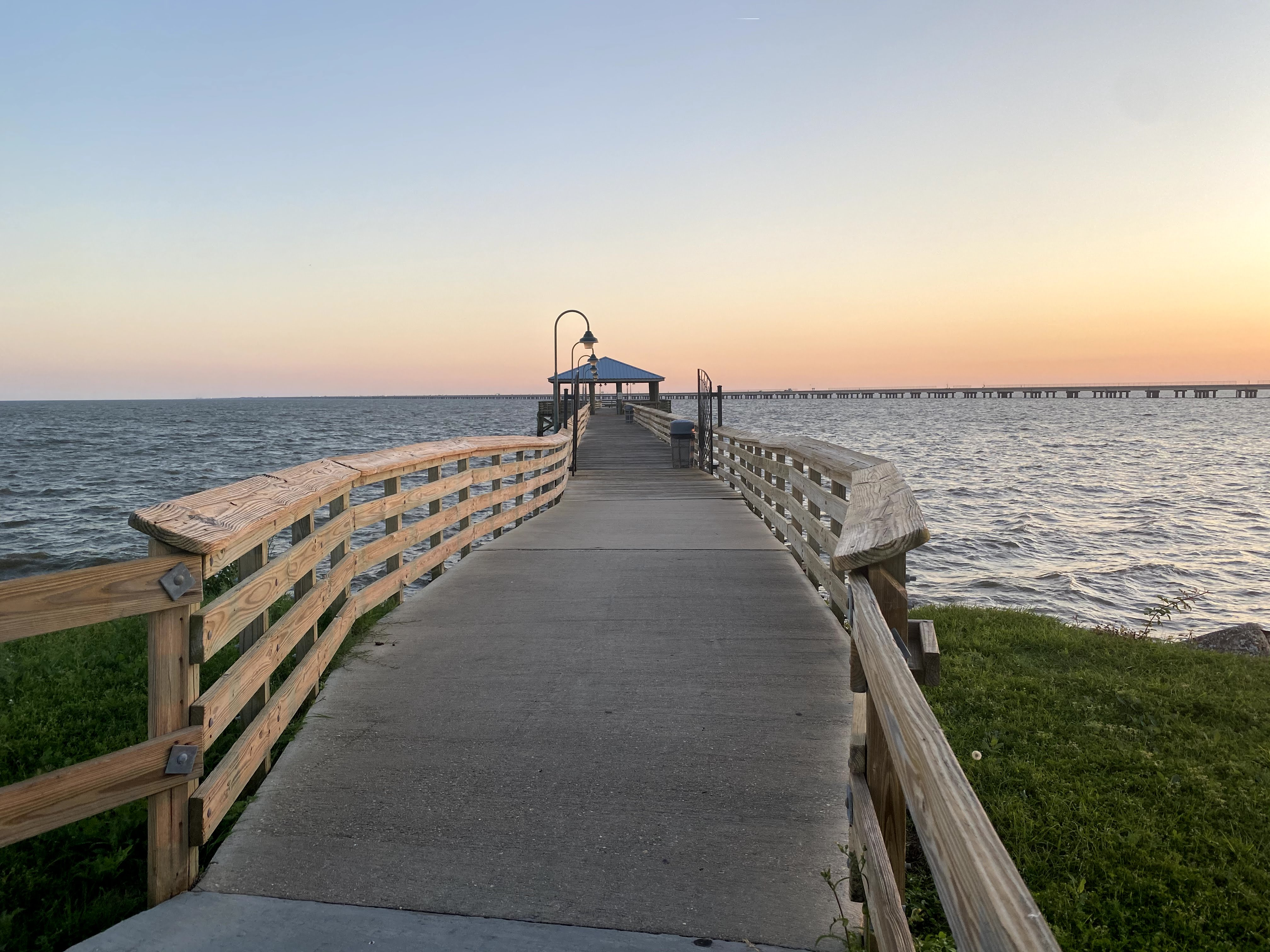
Sunset Point Fisher's Pier

The city of Mandeville has several parks: Fontainebleau State Park, Paul Cordez Park, Lakefront Gazebo, Sunset Point, and Tyler Thomas Park.

Sunset Point Fishing Pier and Park extends over 400 feet (120 m) onto Lake Pontchartrain.

== Education ==
=== Primary and secondary schools ===
==== Public schools ====
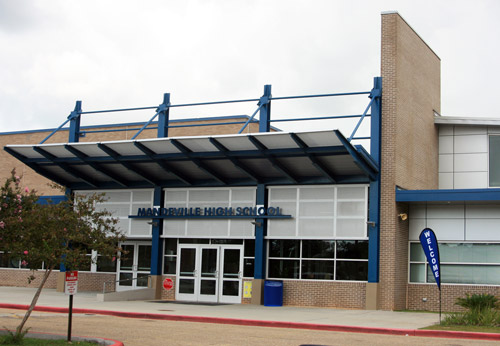
Mandeville High School

St. Tammany Parish Public Schools operates public schools serving the city.

Elementary schools with sections of Mandeville include:

- Mandeville Elementary School (grades Pre-Kindergarten–3, central Mandeville)
- Pontchartrain Elementary (grades Pre-Kindergarten–3, western Mandeville)
- Woodlake Elementary (grades Pre-Kindergarten–3, eastern Mandeville)
- Marigny Elementary (grades Pre-Kindergarten–1, a few blocks)
- Magnolia Trace Elementary (grades 2–3, a few blocks)

Middle schools (grades 4–6) with sections of Mandeville include Tchefuncte Middle School (most of Mandeville), Lake Harbor Middle School (parts of eastern and northern Mandeville), and Sloan Middle School (a few blocks of north and east Mandeville).

For junior high school (grades 7–8), most of Mandeville is zoned to Mandeville Junior High School. A few blocks in the north are zoned to Fontainebleau Junior High, and a few blocks in the east side are zoned to Monteleone Junior High School.

For high school (grades 9–12), most of Mandeville is zoned to Mandeville High School. A few blocks in the north are zoned to Fontainebleau High School, and a few blocks in the east are zoned to Lakeshore High School.

==== Private schools ====
The Roman Catholic Archdiocese of New Orleans operates Catholic parochial schools:

- Mary Queen of Peace School
- Our Lady of the Lake School

Non-Catholic private schools include:

- Cedarwood School - in the city limits
- Lake Castle Private School - northwest of Mandeville

== Public libraries ==
St. Tammany Parish Library operates the Mandeville Library.

=== Community colleges ===
St. Tammany Parish is within the service areas of two community colleges: Northshore Technical Community College and Delgado Community College.

== Notable people ==
Mandeville is the hometown of Cajun fiddler and bandleader Amanda Shaw, the rock group 12 Stones, YouTube personality TJ Kirk, the post-hardcore band As Cities Burn, Wilco bassist John Stirratt, and The Price Is Right model Rachel Reynolds. Actress Allison Scagliotti grew up in Mandeville, as did former US soccer national team player Jason Kreis before entering MLS. SiriusXM's The Mike Church Show is broadcast from a studio in Mandeville five days per week by Mike Church, who is a native of the city. Singer/songwriter Lucinda Williams spent time in Mandeville as a child and noted the town in her song "Crescent City", which has been covered by others including Emmylou Harris. Former WWE wrestler, Brodus Clay has lived in the city of Mandeville since 2010. Former New Orleans Saints offensive lineman Jim Dombrowski lives in Mandeville. Former Saints wide receiver Rich Mauti lives in Mandeville, and his son, Saints linebacker Michael Mauti, is from Mandeville.

Mandeville has an active political scene, with Eddie Price having been elected mayor for several terms commencing in 1996. He stepped down as mayor on October 9, 2009, and subsequently pleaded guilty to charges including tax evasion and depriving citizens of honest services through mail fraud. The city council then selected Edward "Bubby" Lyons as interim mayor. White nationalist and white supremacist David Duke has a residence in Mandeville, and is a perennial candidate. His most notable electoral outcomes are his almost-wins for Senate in 1990 and Governor of Louisiana in 1991 and his successful bid for the Louisiana House of Representatives from 1989 to 1992.

Author Margaux Fragoso spent the final years of her life in Mandeville with her second husband, Tom O'Connor, and her daughter, Alicia McGowan, from her first marriage.

== Sister cities ==
Mandeville has one sister city, as designated by Sister Cities International:

- Colón, Panama
