= St. Tammany Parish Public Schools =

School district in Louisiana, United States

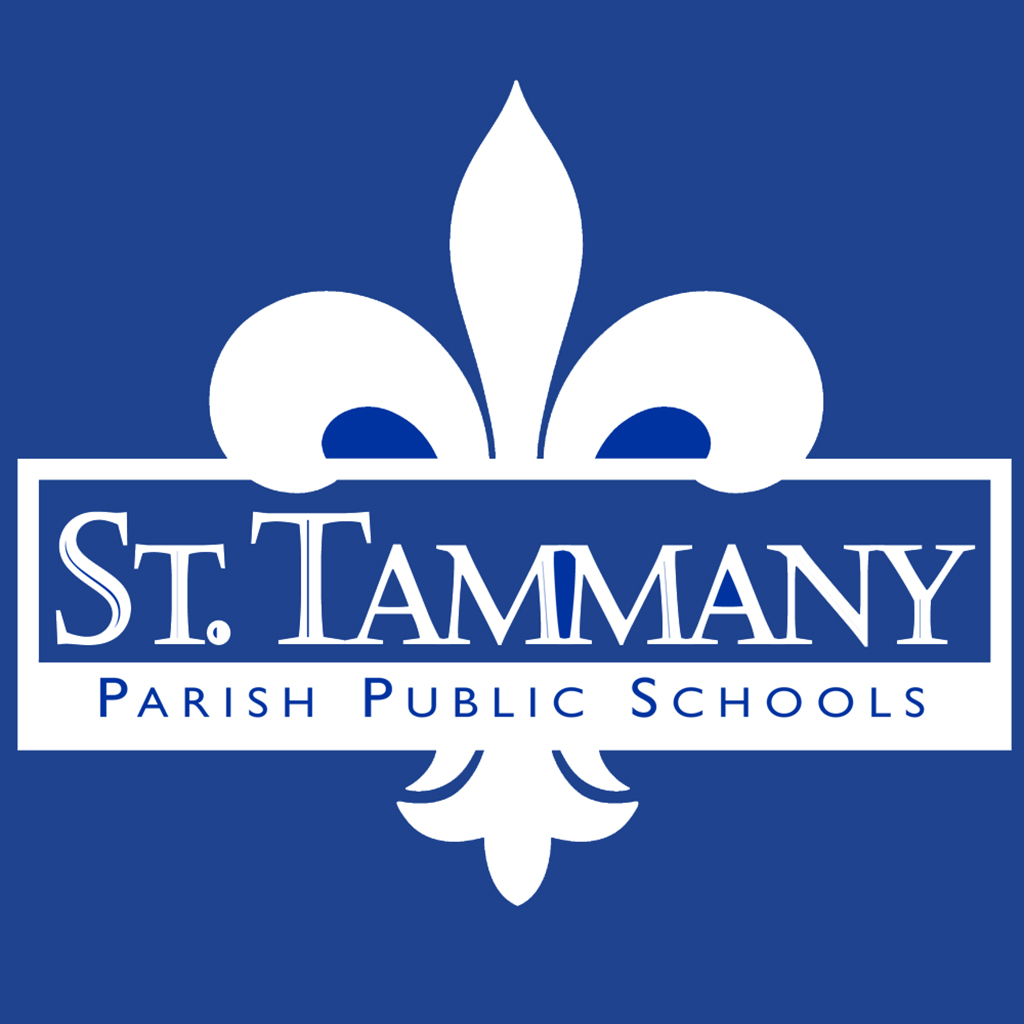

Address
- 321 N Theard Street Covington, Louisiana, 70433-2835; United States

District information
- Grades: PK-12
- Schools: 55
- Budget: $497,271,000 (2017–18)
- NCES District ID: 2201650

Students and staff
- Students: 38,041 (2018–19)
- Teachers: 2,049.91 (FTE)
- Student–teacher ratio: 18.56

Other information
- Website: www.stpsb.org

St. Tammany Parish Public Schools (STPPS) is a public school district serving the children of St. Tammany Parish, located along the Northshore banks of Lake Pontchartrain in southeast Louisiana, United States. The district's Central Office is located in downtown Covington, on the site of the original Covington High School and the former sites of the Covington Grammar School and C.J. Schoen Middle School. The district also has an annex location in Slidell, Louisiana, to serve the east side of St. Tammany Parish.

The district is entirely in, and includes all of, the parish.

STPPS was again rated as an "A" district by the Louisiana Department of Education in 2017. The fifth-largest school district in the state, St. Tammany Parish Public Schools serves nearly 39,000 students in 55 schools. It is the largest employer in St. Tammany Parish, employing more than 5,800 people. All STPPS teachers are certified with more than 50 percent of all teachers holding a master's degree or more. In 2018-2019, STPPS students posted an average composite score of 21.2 on the ACT, leading the state of Louisiana.

St. Tammany Parish Public School System programs, students, and employees are widely recognized throughout the nation. Students continue to score above national and state levels on standardized tests used to measure student achievement. A majority of graduates choose to further their education and are accepted at colleges and universities throughout the country.

St. Tammany Parish Public School System is a state financial leader, and has the highest bond rating of any public school board in Louisiana.

== Preparing Students for Success ==
In 2018–2019, more than 2,370 students graduated and they received a combined $100 million in scholarships and TOPS funding. During the same school year, STPPS students earned 15,519 dual enrollment credit hours and 5,261 industry-based certifications earned in career tech programs.

== Schools ==
STPPS is a public school system in the state of Louisiana with 55 schools serving St. Tammany Parish.

| School | Grades | Location | Mascot | Established |
|---|---|---|---|---|
| Abita Springs Elementary School | Pre K-3 | Abita Springs | Bees | 1978 |
| Abita Springs Middle School | 4-6 | Abita Springs | Warriors | 1923 |
| Abney Early Childhood Center | Pre K-K | Slidell | Spartan Sprouts | 2011 |
| Abney Elementary School | 1-5 | Slidell | Little Spartans | 1964 |
| Alton Elementary School | Pre K-5 | Slidell | Rams | 1957 |
| Bayou Lacombe Middle School | 4-6 | Lacombe | Cardinals | 1956 |
| Bayou Woods Elementary School | Pre K-3 | Slidell | Alligators | 1986 |
| Bonne Ecole Elementary School | Pre K-6 | Slidell | Superstars | 1975 |
| Boyet Junior High School | 7-8 | Slidell | Rebels | 1963 |
| Brock Elementary School | Pre K-5 | Slidell | Beavers | 1909 |
| Carolyn Park Middle School | 4-6 | Slidell | Eagles | 1966 |
| Chahta-Ima Elementary School | Pre K-3 | Lacombe | Choctaws | 1953 |
| Clearwood Junior High School | 4-8 | Slidell | Cougars | 1978 |
| Covington Elementary School | Pre K-3 | Covington | Little Lions | 1956 |
| Covington High School | 9-12 | Covington | Lions | 1913 |
| Creekside Junior High School | 6-8 | Pearl River | Gators | 2002 |
| Cypress Cove Elementary School | Pre K-1 | Slidell | Eagles | 1994 |
| Fifth Ward Junior High School | Pre K-8 | Bush | Falcons | 1949 |
| Florida Avenue Elementary School | Pre K-3 | Slidell | Tigers | 1956 |
| Folsom Elementary School | Pre K-5 | Folsom | Tigers | 1949 |
| Folsom Junior High School | 6-8 | Folsom | Hawks | 1970 |
| Fontainebleau High School | 9-12 | Mandeville | Bulldogs | 1994 |
| Fontainebleau Junior High School | 7-8 | Mandeville | Hurricanes | 1996 |
| Gayle Sloan Middle School | 4-6 | Mandeville | Seagulls | 1977 |
| Honey Island Elementary School | 2-3 | Slidell | Honey Bees | 1988 |
| Lake Harbor Middle School | 4-6 | Mandeville | Owls | 2001 |
| Lakeshore High School | 9-12 | Mandeville | Titans | 2009 |
| Lancaster Elementary School | 3-6 | Madisonville | Sea Turtles | 2011 |
| Lee Road Junior High School | Pre K-8 | Covington | Rebels | 1941 |
| Little Oak Middle School | 4-6 | Slidell | Oak Trees | 1981 |
| Little Pearl Elementary School | Pre K-K | Pearl River | Pearls | 2008 |
| Lyon Elementary School | Pre K-3 | Covington | Lil' Lions | 1964 |
| Madisonville Elementary School | Pre K-2 | Madisonville | Minnows | 1959 |
| Madisonville Junior High School | 7-8 | Madisonville | Eagles | 1956 |
| Magnolia Trace Elementary School | 2-3 | Mandeville | Catahoula Hounds | 1999 |
| Mandeville Elementary School | Pre K-3 | Mandeville | Whales | 1966 |
| Mandeville High School | 9-12 | Mandeville | Skippers | 1921 |
| Mandeville Junior High School | 7-8 | Mandeville | Patriots | 1979 |
| Marigny Elementary School | Pre K-1 | Mandeville | Starfish | 2009 |
| Mayfield Elementary School | Pre K-6 | Slidell | Black Bears | 2011 |
| Monteleone Junior High School | 7-8 | Mandeville | Marlins | 2005 |
| Northshore High School | 9-12 | Slidell | Panthers | 1982 |
| Pearl River High School | 9-12 | Pearl River | Rebels | 1968 |
| Pine View Middle School | 4-6 | Covington | Tigers | 1965 |
| Pitcher Junior High School | 7-8 | Covington | Panthers | 1978 |
| Pontchartrain Elementary School | Pre K-3 | Mandeville | Eagles | 1994 |
| Riverside Elementary School | 1-5 | Pearl River | Bears | 1987 |
| St. Tammany Junior High School | 6-8 | Slidell | Wildcats | 1921 |
| Salmen High School | 9-12 | Slidell | Spartans | 1965 |
| Sixth Ward Elementary School | Pre K-5 | Pearl River | Cardinals | 1904 |
| Slidell High School | 9-12 | Slidell | Tigers | 1908 |
| Slidell Junior High School | 7-8 | Slidell | Tigers | 1972 |
| Tchefuncte Middle School | 4-6 | Mandeville | Gators | 1994 |
| Whispering Forest Elementary School | Pre K-3 | Slidell | Critters of the Forest | 1989 |
| Woodlake Elementary School | Pre K-3 | Mandeville | Pelicans | 1987 |

== History ==
Fourteen superintendents have led the St. Tammany Parish Public School System since its inception in 1900. Five current STPPS schools are named after former superintendents - Lancaster Elementary, Lyon Elementary, Pitcher Junior High, Monteleone Junior High, and Sloan Middle School. The current superintendent, Frank Jabbia, took the position in October 2020.

- Joseph B. Lancaster (1900-1904)
- H.A. Verret (1904-1905)
- W.G. Evans (1905-1909)
- A.B. Peters (1909-1910)
- H.B. Messick (1910-1911)
- Elmer E. Lyon (1911-1937)
- William Pitcher (1937-1967)
- Cyprian J. "Cyp" Schoen (1967-1986)
- Richard Tanner (1986, Acting)
- Terry J. Bankston (1986-1995)
- Leonard P. Monteleone (1995-2003)
- Gayle Sloan (2003-2010)
- W.L. "Trey" Folse, III (2010-2019)
- Peter J. Jabbia, Interim (2020)
- Frank Jabbia (2020–2026)

== School Board members ==
- Matthew E. Greene, District 1
- Elizabeth B. Heintz, District 2
- Michael J. Dirmann, District 3
- Stephen J. "Jack" Loup III, District 4
- C. Brandon Harrell, District 5 (Vice President)
- Michael C. Nation, District 6 (President)
- Shelta J. Richardson, District 7
- Michael E. Winkler, District 8
- Sharon Lo Drucker, District 9
- Ronald "Ron" Bettencourtt, District 10
- Tammy Lamy, District 11
- Richard "Rickey" Hursey Jr., District 12
- James Braud, District 13
- Dennis S. Cousin, District 14
- Lisa M. Page, District 15
