= Mandeville High School =

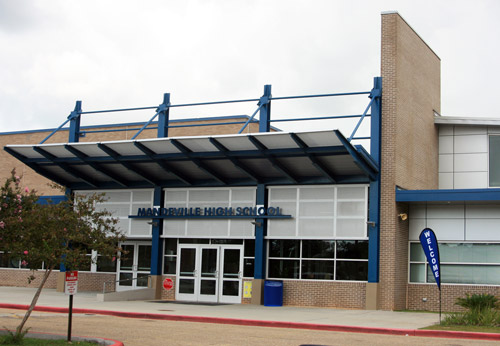

Location
- 1 Skipper Drive; Mandeville, LA 70471; United States; 30.3813°N 90.1015°W

Information
- Type: Public
- Motto: "Seas the day."
- Established: 1921
- School district: St. Tammany Parish Public Schools
- Principal: Christian Monson
- Teaching staff: 137,48 (on an FTE basis)
- Grades: 9–12
- Gender: Coed
- Enrollment: 2,006 (2025–26)
- Student to teacher ratio: 15.92
- Colors: Royal blue and white
- Athletics: football, men's basketball, women's basketball, baseball, softball, golf, men's volleyball, women's volleyball, marching band, color guard, dance, cheerleading
- Mascot: Skipper
- Nickname: Skippers
- Rival: St. Paul’s School
- Website: mandevillehigh.stpsb.org

Mandeville High School is a four-year public high school located in Mandeville, Louisiana, a northern suburban of New Orleans. It is part of the St. Tammany Parish Public Schools system. MHS was named a Blue Ribbon school in 2002. In addition to serving most of Mandeville, the school also serves the nearby towns of Madisonville and Lewisburg.

== History ==
The original Mandeville school was founded in 1918, with an enrollment of 138 students in grades 1-10. As the region's population increased through 1971, more students enrolled, and the school was split into an elementary, middle, and high school. In 1979, the current building for Mandeville High School was constructed, and the old Mandeville school building became the junior high school.

== Demographics ==
As of 2026, Mandeville High School has a student population of 2,006 that is 0.3% Native American, 1.7% Asian, 2.4% multiracial, 6.9% black, 8.3% Hispanic, and 80.2% white. Approximately 70% of its graduates continue their education: 68% are going to four-year colleges or universities, and 2% going to either two-year colleges or other post secondary institutions.

There are more than 120 members on the professional staff, 58 of whom have a master's degree or higher.

== Activities and programs ==
=== Clubs ===
Clubs offered at Mandeville High include National Junior Honor Society (NJHS), Key Club, Fellowship of Christian Athletes, Next Gen, Quiz Bowl, Mu Alpha Theta, Green Club, E-Sports, Jazz Band, Robotics, and Yoga Club.

=== Athletics ===
Mandeville High School sports teams compete in the Louisiana High School Athletic Association. Sports offered by the school include: football, men's basketball, women's basketball, baseball, softball, golf, men's volleyball, women's volleyball, marching band, color guard, dance, and cheerleading.

The school's football stadium is dedicated to the founding coach of Mandeville's football program, Sidney "Sid" Theriot. Coach Theriot played college football at Texas A&M University where he was one of the Junction Boys under coach Bear Bryant.

Mandeville won a state championship in Boy's Soccer in 1996.

== Notable alumni ==
- Joseph Bulovas, college football placekicker for the Vanderbilt Commodores
- Blake Butera, baseball manager
- Jack Cressend, former MLB player (Minnesota Twins, Cleveland Indians)
- Faith Hathaway, murder victim killed by Robert Lee Willie
- Stacy Hollowell, college basketball head coach for the New Orleans Privateers
- Jason Kreis, former MLS star and current coach of MLS New York City Football Club

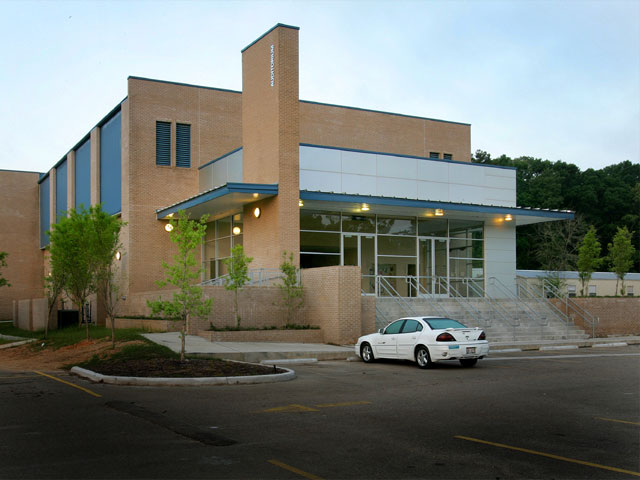
Auditorium at Mandeville High School

- Michael Mauti, former NFL player (New Orleans Saints)
- B. J. Sams, former NFL player (Baltimore Ravens, Kansas City Chiefs)
- Nate Sheppard, college football running back for the Duke Blue Devils
- Will Sheppard, NFL wide receiver for the Green Bay Packers
- Ian Somerhalder, actor, model, and director
- John Stirratt, bassist and multi instrumentalist for Uncle Tupelo, Wilco, and The Autumn Defense
- Josh Tickell, Sundance award-winning film director
- Theo Von, stand-up comedian, television personality, host, and actor
- Tina Watson, murder victim killed by her husband while scuba diving in Australia in 2003
