= Northshore High School =

Location
- 100 Panther Drive; Slidell, Louisiana 70461; United States; 30.382011°N 90.10128°W

Information
- Type: Public secondary school
- Motto: A Challenging and Caring Community Encouraging Lifelong Learning for All Students
- Established: 1982
- School district: St. Tammany Parish Public Schools
- Superintendent: Frank Jabbia
- Principal: Bill Gallagher
- Staff: 104.07 (on an FTE basis)
- Enrollment: 1,610 (2023–2024)
- Student to teacher ratio: 15.47
- Colors: Navy, Columbia blue and silver
- Mascot: Panther
- Nickname: Panthers
- Website: northshorehigh.stpsb.org

Northshore High School is a public high school in Slidell, Louisiana, United States. It serves students in grades nine through 12 and is part of St. Tammany Parish Public Schools. The school is located at 100 Panther Drive.

Northshore serves small portions of northern and eastern Slidell. The students of Northshore High School are residents of a suburban community east of New Orleans and across Lake Pontchartrain from the city. The school opened in 1982 as the fourth high school serving the Slidell area. It began with about 800 students and later grew to more than 1,600 students.

The school year follows the St. Tammany Parish Public Schools calendar and provides 178 instructional days for ninth through 12th grades.

== Academics ==
Northshore High School is approved by the Louisiana Department of Education and accredited by the Southern Association of Colleges and Schools.

The Louisiana Department of Education's 2019–2020 school report card for Northshore High School did not include new performance scores because statewide testing was waived during the COVID-19 pandemic. The report card instead listed the school's 2018–2019 performance score as 96.1, equivalent to an A rating.

== Athletics ==
Northshore High School athletics competes in the Louisiana High School Athletic Association.

The baseball team won a state title in 2009. Pitcher Ryan Eades, later a Major League Baseball player, was a two-time all-state selection at Northshore and was part of the championship team as a junior.

== Construction and expansions ==
Construction of Northshore High School was completed in 1982. Facilities have changed since the school's initial construction, and additional wings have been added to the main building as enrollment increased.

In 2022, the school building was modified to add classrooms. The project also included a bus canopy and covered walkway connecting the main building with the additions.

== Notable alumni ==
- Ryan Eades, baseball player
- Chris Faulk, professional football player
- Logan Morrison, baseball player
