= National Register of Historic Places listings in St. Tammany Parish, Louisiana =

Location of St. Tammany Parish in Louisiana

This is a list of the National Register of Historic Places listings in St. Tammany Parish, Louisiana.

This is intended to be a complete list of the properties and districts on the National Register of Historic Places in St. Tammany Parish, Louisiana, United States. The locations of National Register properties and districts for which the latitude and longitude coordinates are included below, may be seen in a map.

There are 44 properties and districts listed on the National Register in the parish. Another property was once listed, but has since been removed.

This National Park Service list is complete through NPS recent listings posted August 28, 2026.

== Current listings ==
	Name on the Register	Image	Date listed	Location	City or town	Description
1	Abita Springs Historic District	Abita Springs Historic District	March 12, 1982 (#82004622)	Louisiana Highways 36, 59, and 435; 30°28′35″N 90°02′13″W	Abita Springs	
2	Abita Springs Pavilion	Abita Springs Pavilion	August 19, 1975 (#75002062)	Northwestern end of Main St. 30°28′48″N 90°02′25″W	Abita Springs	Originally built for 1884 World's Fair in New Orleans before being moved to Abita Springs
3	Arcade Theater	Arcade Theater	August 29, 1997 (#97000966)	2247-2251 Carey St. 30°16′23″N 89°47′02″W	Slidell	
4	Bertus-Ducatel House	Bertus-Ducatel House	March 5, 1998 (#98000182)	1721 Lakeshore Dr. 30°21′03″N 90°03′52″W	Mandeville	
5	Bogue Falaya Park	Bogue Falaya Park	August 17, 2017 (#100001483)	213 Park Dr. 30°28′15″N 90°05′40″W	Covington	
6	Camp Salmen House	Camp Salmen House	April 24, 2006 (#06000323)	35122 Camp Salmen Rd. 30°17′26″N 89°49′30″W	Slidell vicinity	
7	Christ Episcopal Church	Christ Episcopal Church	April 17, 1980 (#80004253)	120 N. New Hampshire St. 30°28′20″N 90°05′06″W	Covington	
8	Claiborne Cottage Hotel	Claiborne Cottage Hotel	July 8, 2019 (#100004152)	19130 Rogers Ln. 30°28′24″N 90°05′17″W	Covington vicinity	Resort hotel opened in 1880 in former St. Tammany Parish Courthouse built 1819.
9	Francois Cousin House	Francois Cousin House	September 16, 2002 (#02000982)	28061 Main St. 30°18′38″N 89°56′06″W	Lacombe	
10	Dendinger House	Dendinger House	September 22, 1992 (#92001252)	206 Covington St. 30°24′36″N 90°09′38″W	Madisonville	
11	Dew Drop Social and Benevolent Hall	Dew Drop Social and Benevolent Hall	September 22, 2000 (#00001145)	400 block of Lamarque St. 30°21′20″N 90°03′44″W	Mandeville	
12	Division of St. John Historic District	Division of St. John Historic District	December 6, 1982 (#82000461)	19 full and 11 partial blks. roughly centered on US 190 Bus\LA 21; 30°28′33″N 90°05′38″W	Covington	Boundary decrease approved March 23, 2023. Includes the Southern Hotel
13	Flagstaff	Flagstaff	September 15, 1983 (#83000543)	1815 Lakeshore Dr. 30°21′06″N 90°03′55″W	Mandeville	
14	Folsom Branch Library		September 29, 2022 (#100008263)	13260 Broadway St. 30°37′45″N 90°11′13″W	Folsom	
15	Fontainebleau State Park	Fontainebleau State Park	August 10, 1999 (#99000256)	67825 U.S. Route 190; 30°20′11″N 90°01′53″W	Mandeville vicinity	
16	Frederick House	Frederick House	August 11, 1982 (#82004624)	238 Vermont St. 30°28′14″N 90°05′48″W	Covington	
17	Griffin's Bakery	Griffin's Bakery	December 1, 1997 (#97001423)	301 Lafitte St. 30°21′21″N 90°04′03″W	Mandeville	
18	Haaswood Store	Haaswood Store	July 15, 2009 (#09000518)	62011 Louisiana Highway 1091; 30°20′06″N 89°44′52″W	Haswood	
19	Jay House	Jay House	May 29, 1998 (#98000593)	Facing the Tchefuncte River, within Fairview-Riverside State Park; 30°24′28″N 90°08′34″W	Madisonville vicinity	Also known as the "Otis House."
20	Johnson House	Johnson House	December 27, 2002 (#02001602)	402 Lafitte St. 30°21′28″N 90°04′03″W	Mandeville	also known as "Moore House", "Maison Lafitte". Mansion, later an event venue.
21	Lacombe School		November 8, 1990 (#90001742)	Junction of St. Mary and 14th Sts. 30°18′56″N 89°56′37″W	Lacombe	
22	Longbranch Annex		July 21, 1983 (#83000544)	Louisiana Highway 36 and Gordon St. 30°28′54″N 90°02′32″W	Abita Springs	
23	Madisonville Bank	Madisonville Bank	December 28, 1983 (#83003636)	400 Cedar St. 30°24′27″N 90°09′33″W	Madisonville	
24	Madisonville Boarding House	Madisonville Boarding House	August 16, 1996 (#96000898)	703 Main St. 30°24′16″N 90°09′25″W	Madisonville	
25	Madisonville Town Hall	Madisonville Town Hall	November 8, 1990 (#90001741)	203 Cedar; 30°24′34″N 90°09′32″W	Madisonville	
26	McCaleb House	McCaleb House	June 7, 1990 (#90000874)	906 Main St. 30°24′10″N 90°09′25″W	Madisonville	
27	Moore House	Moore House	April 20, 1983 (#83000545)	1717 Lakeshore Dr. 30°21′03″N 90°03′52″W	Mandeville	
28	Morel-Nott House		June 6, 1980 (#80004254)	Lakefront Dr. 30°21′31″N 90°04′46″W	Mandeville	Creole-style raised cottage
29	New Orleans and Northeastern Railroad-New Orleans and Great Northern Railroad Depot	New Orleans and Northeastern Railroad-New Orleans and Great Northern Railroad Depot	October 24, 1996 (#96001188)	1809 Front St. 30°16′42″N 89°46′57″W	Slidell	Train station built in 1913 and renovated in 1990s; continues in daily use for Amtrak's Crescent route.
30	Pottery Hill		October 13, 2011 (#11000736)	Address Restricted	Mandeville	
31	Rankin House		March 19, 1991 (#91000253)	61467 Jacques Lemieux Boulevard; 30°20′05″N 90°00′13″W	Mandeville vicinity	
32	Saint Joseph Abbey Church	Saint Joseph Abbey Church	March 21, 2007 (#07000165)	75376 River Rd. 30°31′35″N 90°06′41″W	Saint Benedict	
33	Saint Joseph Abbey Refectory		March 21, 2007 (#07000166)	75376 River Rd. 30°31′39″N 90°06′47″W	Saint Benedict	
34	St. Scholastica Priory and Cemetery		January 31, 2019 (#100003378)	20264 Terra Mariae Blvd. 30°31′44″N 90°04′01″W	Covington vicinity	
35	Salmen House	Salmen House	October 10, 1996 (#96001082)	2854 Front St. 30°16′01″N 89°47′18″W	Slidell	
36	Albert Salmen House	Albert Salmen House	January 21, 1993 (#92001822)	213 Cleveland Ave. 30°16′08″N 89°47′09″W	Slidell	
37	Fritz Salmen House	Fritz Salmen House	November 21, 1991 (#91001722)	127 Cleveland Ave. 30°16′10″N 89°47′12″W	Slidell	
38	Sardy House	Sardy House	December 8, 1997 (#97001517)	810 Main St. 30°24′12″N 90°09′25″W	Madisonville	House has been raised on piers.
39	Sunnybrook		August 29, 1979 (#79003123)	North of Covington on Louisiana Highway 21; 30°31′05″N 90°02′51″W	Covington vicinity	
40	Tammany House		January 23, 2026 (#100012605)	27221 Tammany House Road; 30°31′55″N 89°56′56″W	Abita Springs	
41	Tchefuncte River Range Rear Light	Tchefuncte River Range Rear Light	July 14, 1986 (#86001684)	Northern side of Lake Pontchartrain; 30°22′44″N 90°10′11″W	Madisonville	1868-vintage lighthouse, accessible only via water. Marked the entrance to the river from the Lake, replacing an 1838 light.
42	Tchefuncte Site		June 22, 2000 (#00000717)	Address Restricted	Mandeville	Archaeological site, excavated several times in the 20th century. The Tchefuncte culture ended about 200 CE.
43	Teddy Avenue Residential Historic District		July 6, 2021 (#100006725)	169, 190-604 Teddy Ave., 1737, 1742 4th St. 30°16′43″N 89°46′46″W	Slidell	
44	Williams Cemetery		October 17, 2018 (#100003028)	28183 Main St. 30°18′34″N 89°55′58″W	Lacombe	

== Former listings ==
	Name on the Register	Image	Date listed	Date removed	Location	City or town	Description
1	Longbranch Hotel Complex		June 24, 1982 (#82004623)	May 3, 2016	Rangeline Rd. 30°29′06″N 90°02′28″W	Abita Springs	

== See also ==
- List of National Historic Landmarks in Louisiana
- National Register of Historic Places listings in Louisiana
