= Frederick House =

Frederick House or Fredericks House may refer to:

== United States ==
(by state)

- Fredericks House (Prescott, Arizona)
- Frederick House (Covington, Louisiana), listed on the National Register of Historic Places in St. Tammany Parish, Louisiana
- Fredericks House (Fayson Lakes, New Jersey), listed on the National Register of Historic Places in Morris County, New Jersey

== Canada ==
- Frederick House River, a lake and trading post

== People with the surname ==
- Fred House (born 1978), American basketball player
