= Madisonville Town Hall =

- U.S. National Register of Historic Places
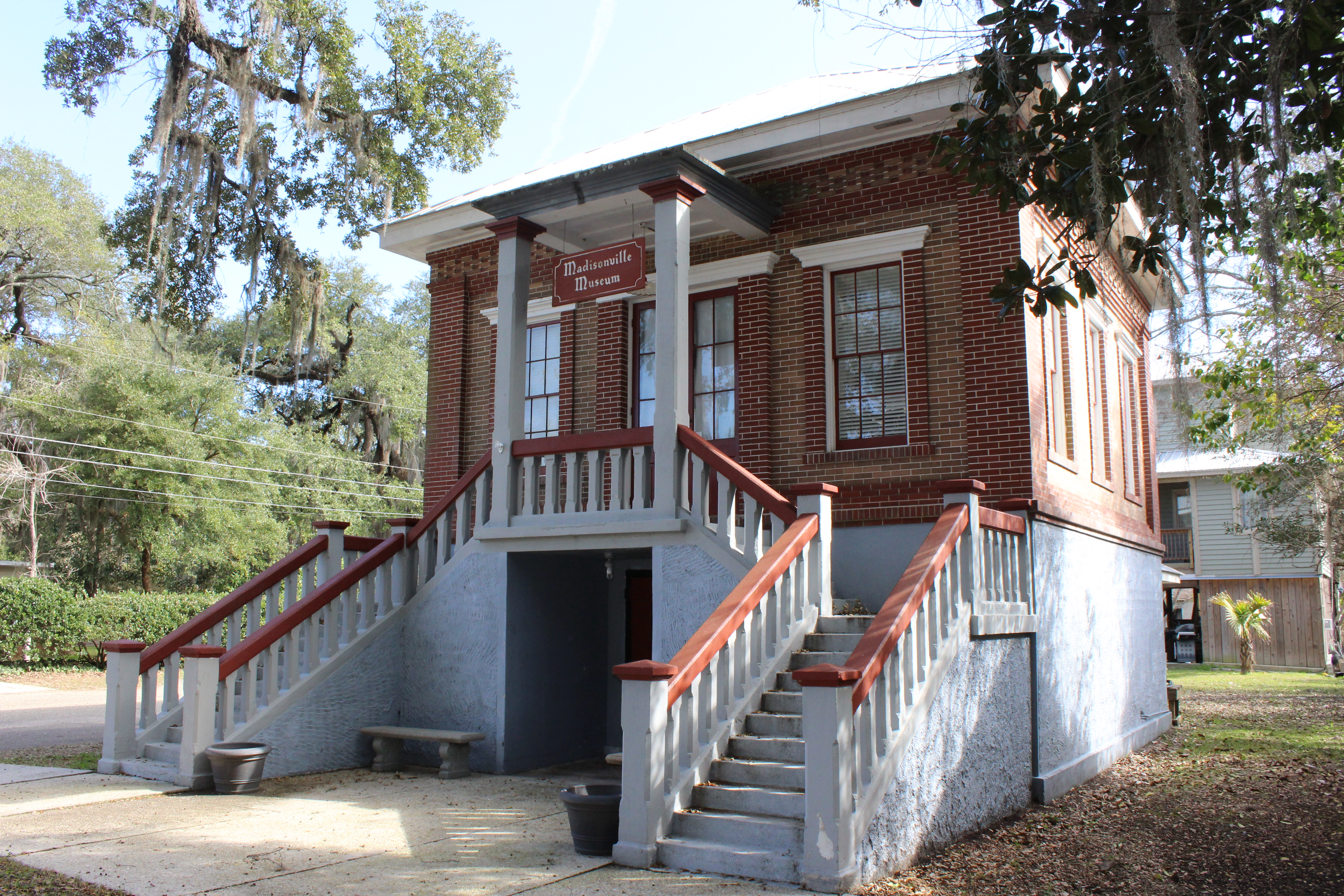

- Location within Louisiana
- Location: 203 Cedar St., Madisonville, Louisiana
- Coordinates: 30°24′34″N 90°09′32″W
- Area: less than one acre
- NRHP reference No.: 90001741
- Added to NRHP: November 8, 1990

The Madisonville Town Hall, at 203 Cedar in Madisonville, Louisiana, was built in 1911. It was listed on the National Register of Historic Places in 1990.

It is a vernacular (no style) two-story brick and stone building. Its concrete first floor has jail cells. The main (second) floor is reached by an exterior double stairway which is the main architectural feature of the building. It served as the town hall until 1976. In 1990 it was serving as the town's police station.

In 2021 it is a museum, the Madisonville Historic Museum, displaying "local Native American history, Civil War history, and history of the families that founded Madisonville."

== See also ==
- Madisonville Bank, at 400 Cedar, also National Register-listed
