= Ducatel =

Ducatel can refer to:

- Bertus-Ducatel House, historic house which was added to the National Register of Historic Places in 1998
- Guillaume Ducatel (born 1979), French footballer
- Julius Timoleon Ducatel (1796–1849), American chemist
- Louis Ducatel (1902–1999), French politician and businessman
