= Christ Episcopal Church (Covington, Louisiana) =

Historic church in Louisiana, United States

- U.S. National Register of Historic Places
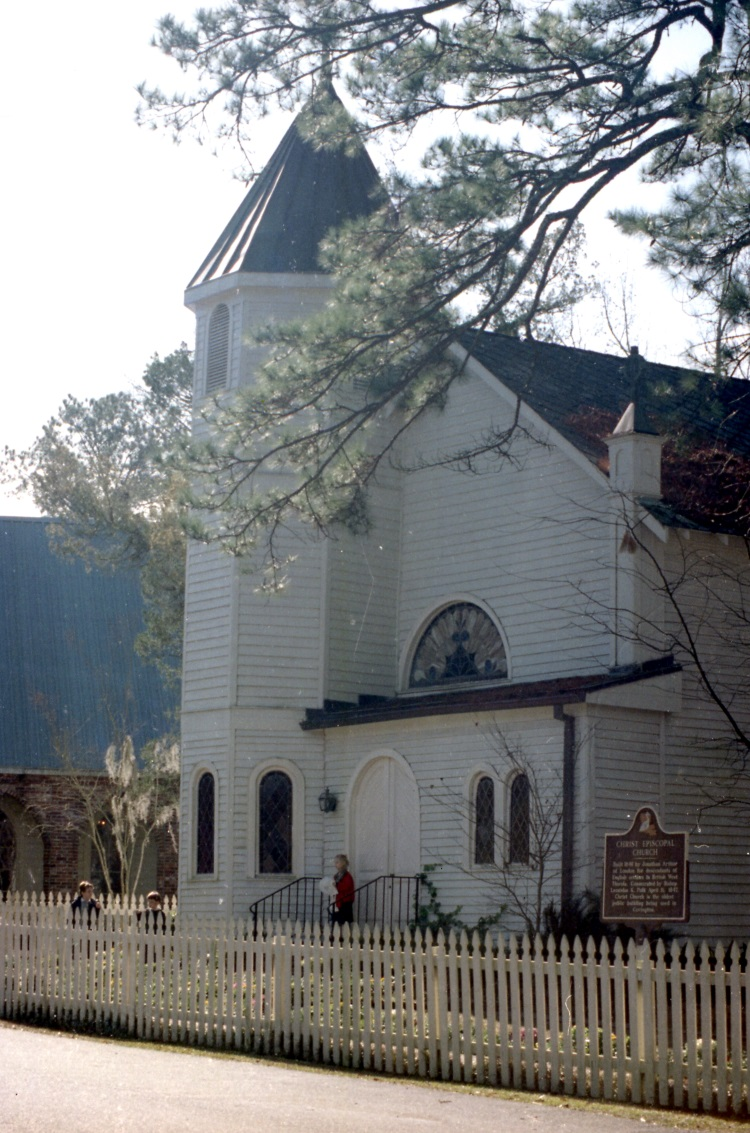

- Location within Louisiana Location within the United States
- Location: 120 S. New Hampshire St, Covington, Louisiana
- Coordinates: 30°28′2″N 90°5′43″W
- Built: 1847
- Architect: Jonathan Arthur
- Architectural style: Greek Revival, Queen Anne Revival
- NRHP reference No.: 80004253
- Added to NRHP: April 17, 1980

Christ Episcopal Church is a historic Episcopal church at 120 N. New Hampshire Street in Covington, Louisiana. The cathedral reported 986 members in 2015 and 1,213 members in 2023; no membership statistics were reported in 2024 parochial reports. Plate and pledge income reported for the congregation in 2024 was $1,107,839. Average Sunday attendance (ASA) in 2024 was 260 persons.

The church was built in 1846 by Jonathan Arthur of London for descendants of English settlers in British West Florida (1763–1783). It was consecrated by Bishop Leonidas Polk on April 11, 1847, Christ Church is the oldest public building being used in Covington.

== See also ==
- National Register of Historic Places listings in St. Tammany Parish, Louisiana
