= Johnson House (Mandeville, Louisiana) =

- U.S. National Register of Historic Places
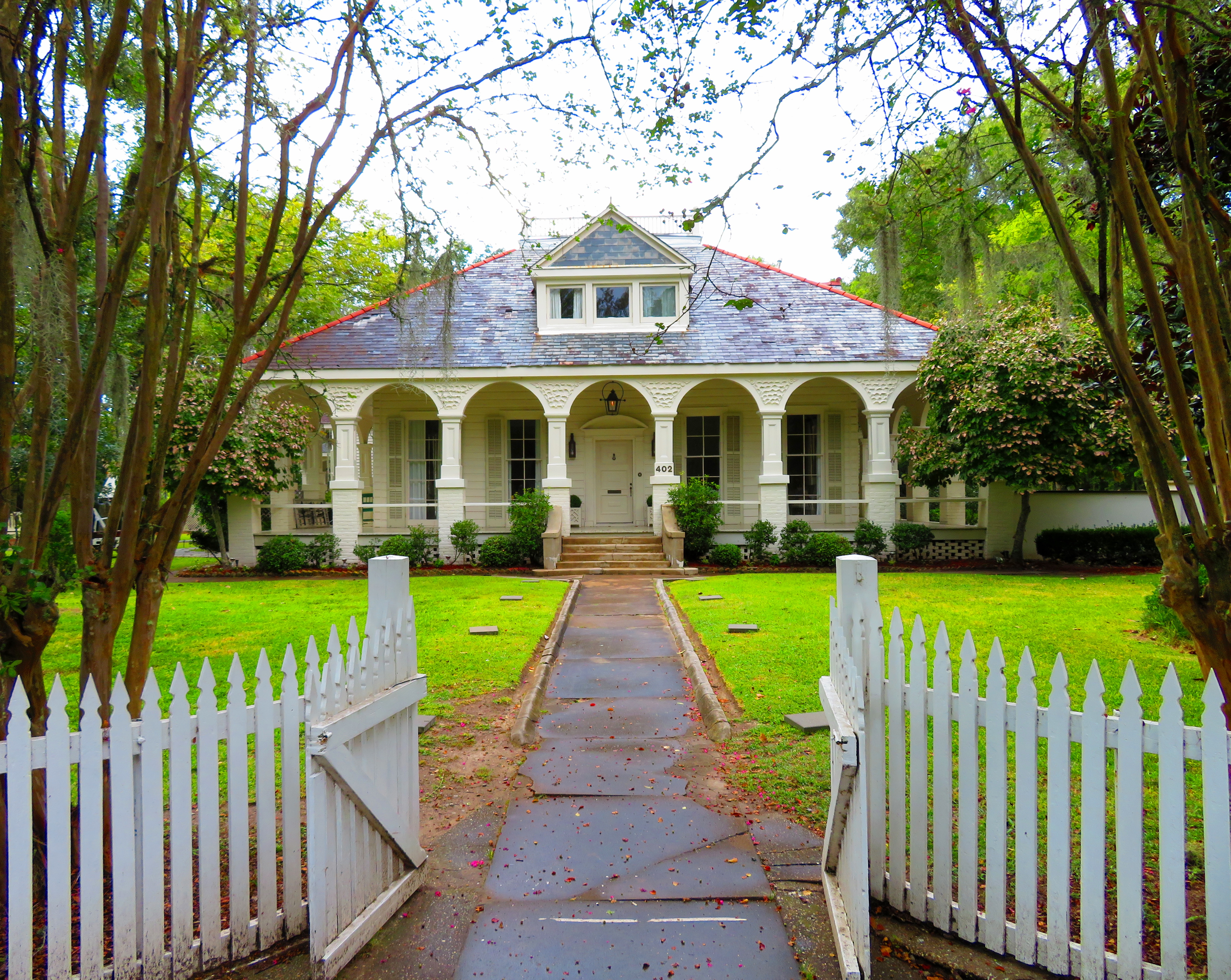

- Location within Louisiana
- Location: 402 Lafitte St., Mandeville, Louisiana
- Coordinates: 30.357778°N 90.0675°W
- Area: 1.3 acres (0.53 ha)
- Built: c.1915
- Architectural style: Mediterranean Revival; Craftsman
- NRHP reference No.: 02001602
- Added to NRHP: December 27, 2002

The Johnson House, in Mandeville in St. Tammany Parish, Louisiana, was substantially built c.1915, redeveloping from a c.1890 predecessor. It is located three blocks from Lake Pontchartrain. It has been marketed as an event venue, Maison Lafitte, with phrase "circa 1880".

It is a "mansion" on a "lush" 1.3 acres (0.53 ha) property.

It was purchased in about 1915 by Thomas Johnson and his wife Mary Celeste, who maintained homes in New Orleans and Mandeville, and who developed it in Mediterranean Revival and/or Craftsman style. It was home to Johnson descendants until 2001.

It was listed on the National Register of Historic Places in 2002.

Photos from 2017
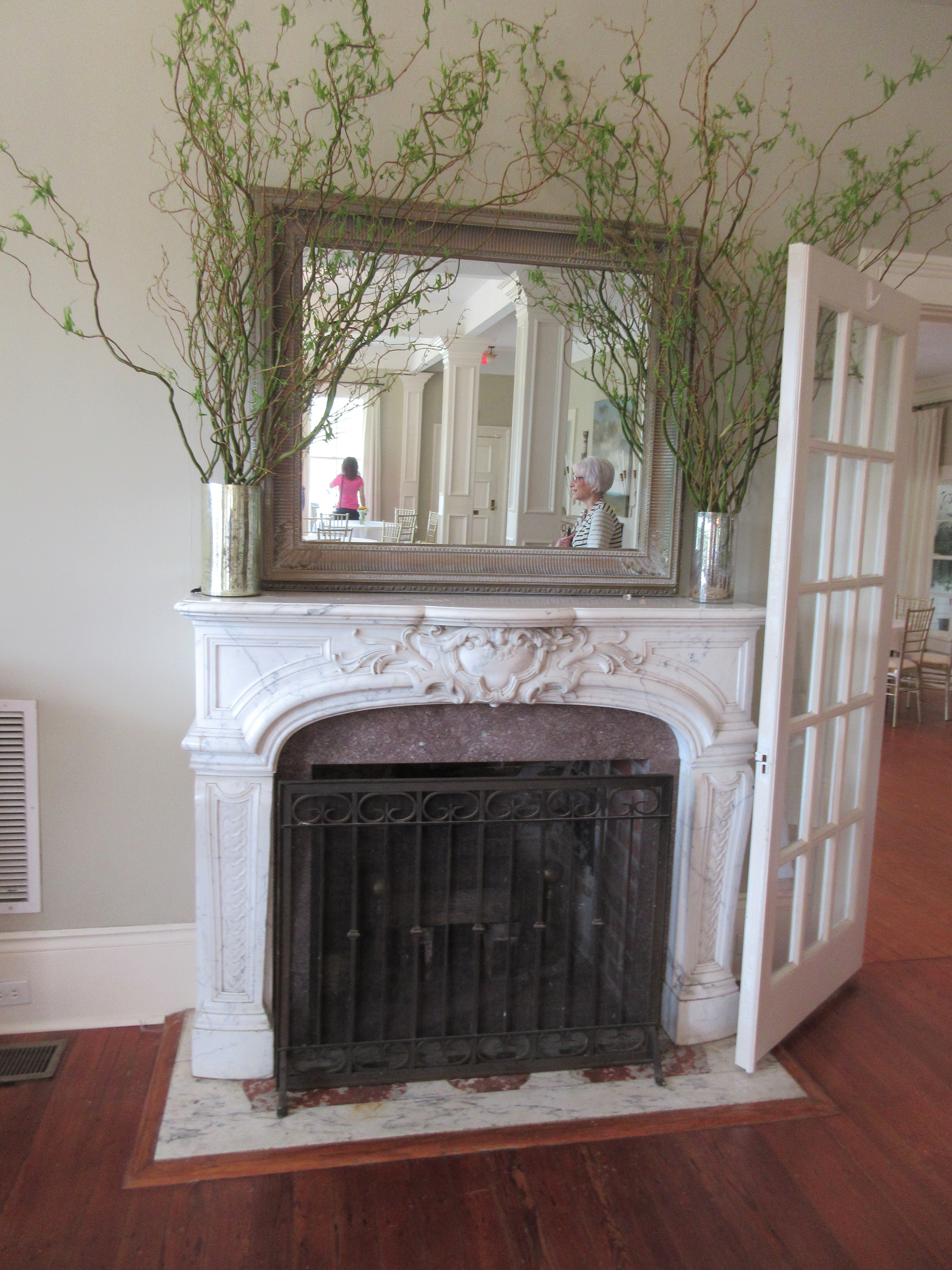
Mantle from 1915 renovation

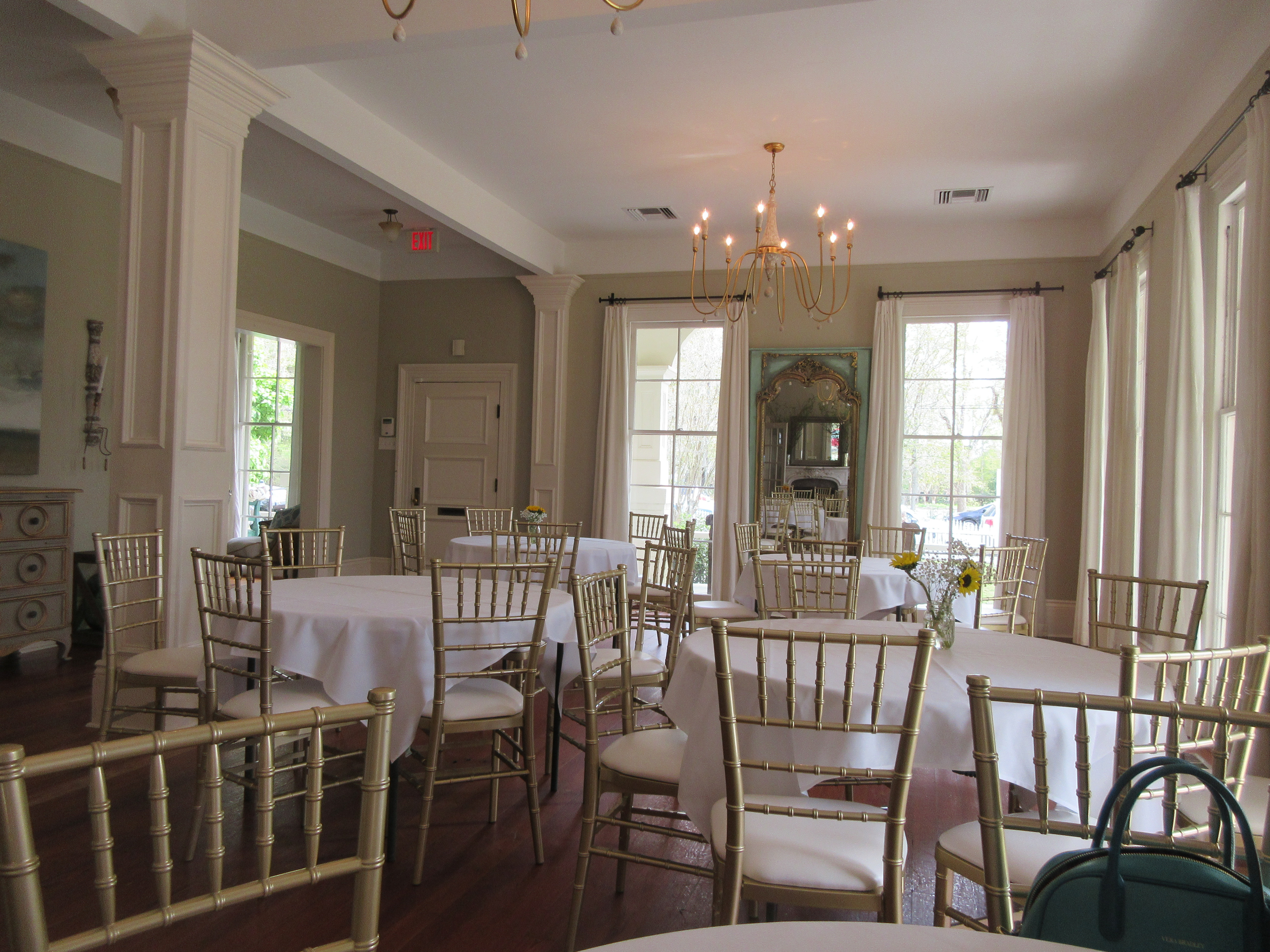
Interior, as an event venue

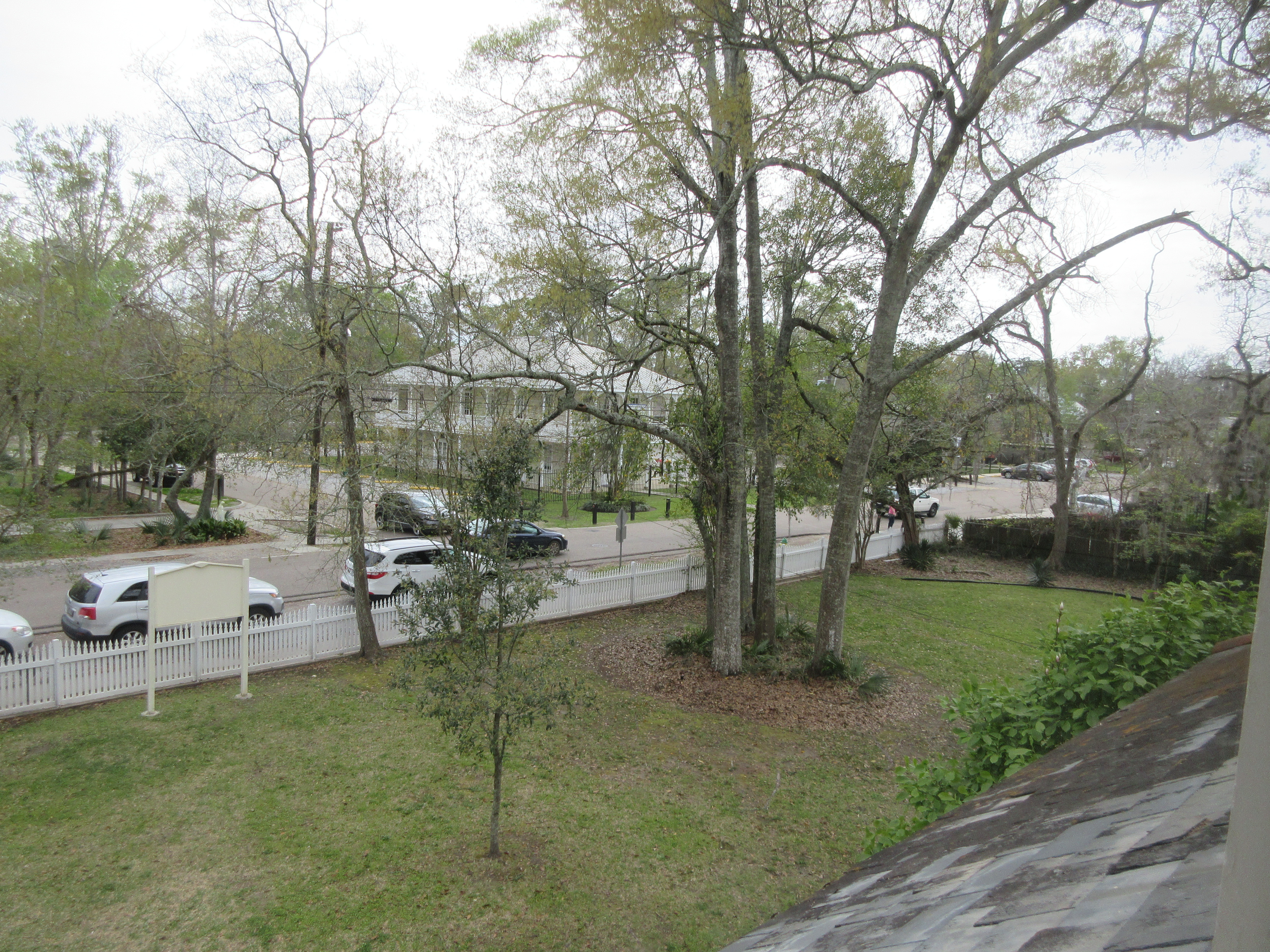
View from its second floor dormer

== See also ==
- Griffin's Bakery, at 301 Lafitte St., also NRHP-listed
