= Camp Salmen House =

Historic house in Louisiana, United States

- U.S. National Register of Historic Places
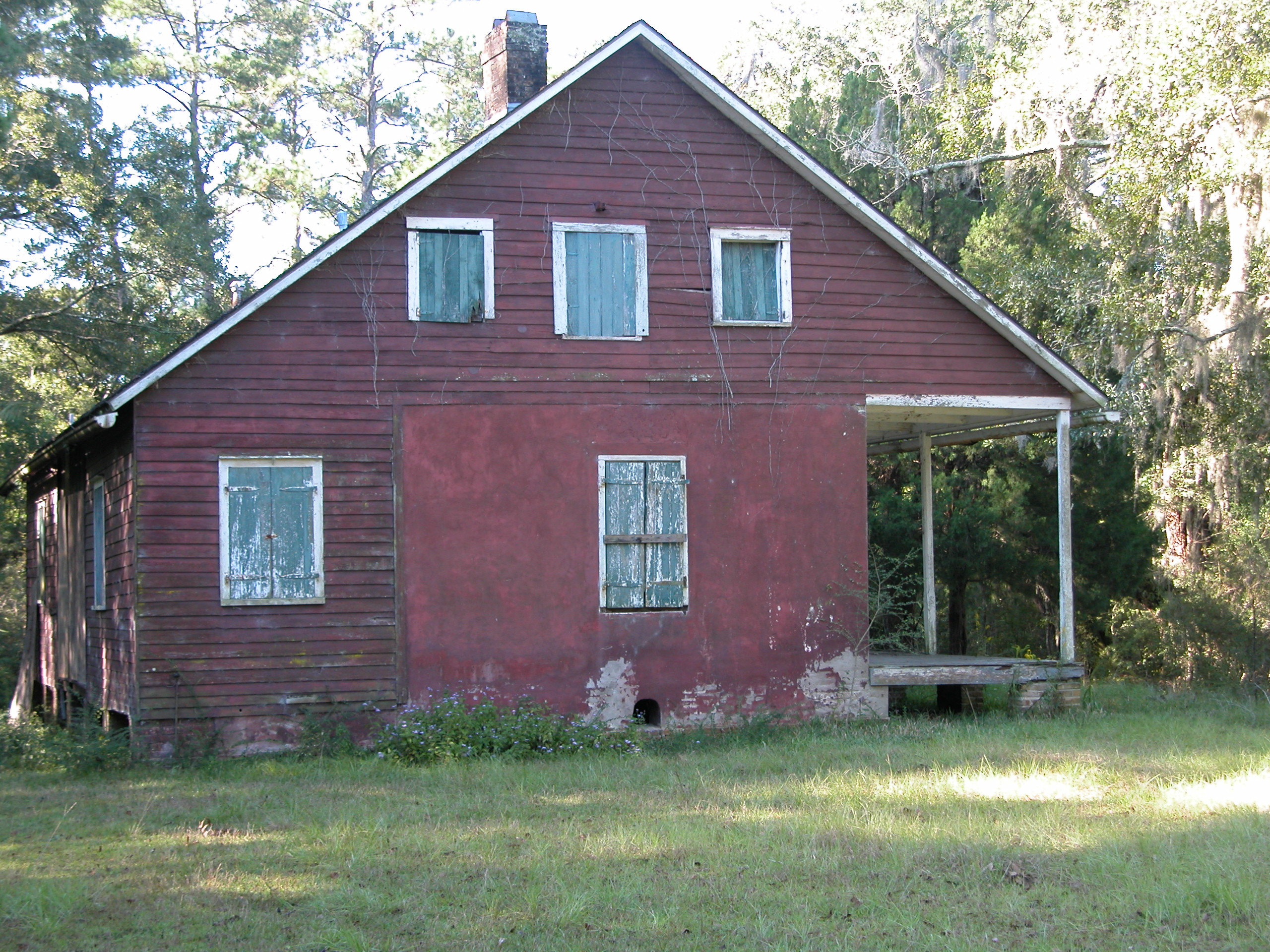
- The photo illustrates the block core and wood post construction of the Camp Salmen House. Note that the rear cabinet/loggia has been enclosed with plywood.

- Location within Louisiana Location within the United States
- Location: 35122 Camp Salmen Rd., Slidell, Louisiana
- Coordinates: 30.29067°N 89.82456°W
- Area: less than one acre
- Built: 1830
- Architectural style: French Creole
- Website: http://www.campsalmennaturepark.org/
- MPS: Louisiana's French Creole Architecture MPS
- NRHP reference No.: 06000323
- Added to NRHP: April 24, 2006

The Camp Salmen House is located on the shores of Bayou Liberty in St. Tammany Parish, west of Slidell, Louisiana, USA. It is a French Creole cottage, circa 1830. The house was built with a brick core, wood frame post rooms, a cabinet/loggia, and front gallery. The entire structure, including the front gallery, is approximately 1,692 square feet. The house was placed on the National Register of Historic Places on April 24, 2006. It is one of only fourteen examples of the period French Creole architecture in the parish. The National Register of Historic Places listings in St. Tammany Parish, Louisiana lists 38 historic places in St. Tammany Parish.

== History ==
The exact year of the house's construction is under research, with 1750 being the earliest given date and 1830 the latest. Data shows that the Francois Cousin House, located across Bayou Liberty in the area of the Salmen House, was built between 1787 and 1790 indicating settlement in the area at that time. While the style of house construction favors that of a family home, many believe that the building served as a trading post.

From 1924 to 1983, the New Orleans Area Council of the Boy Scouts of America ran Camp Salmen on the adjacent property and used the house as the main lodge. In 2010, the former camp became the Camp Salmen Nature Park.

== Photographs ==
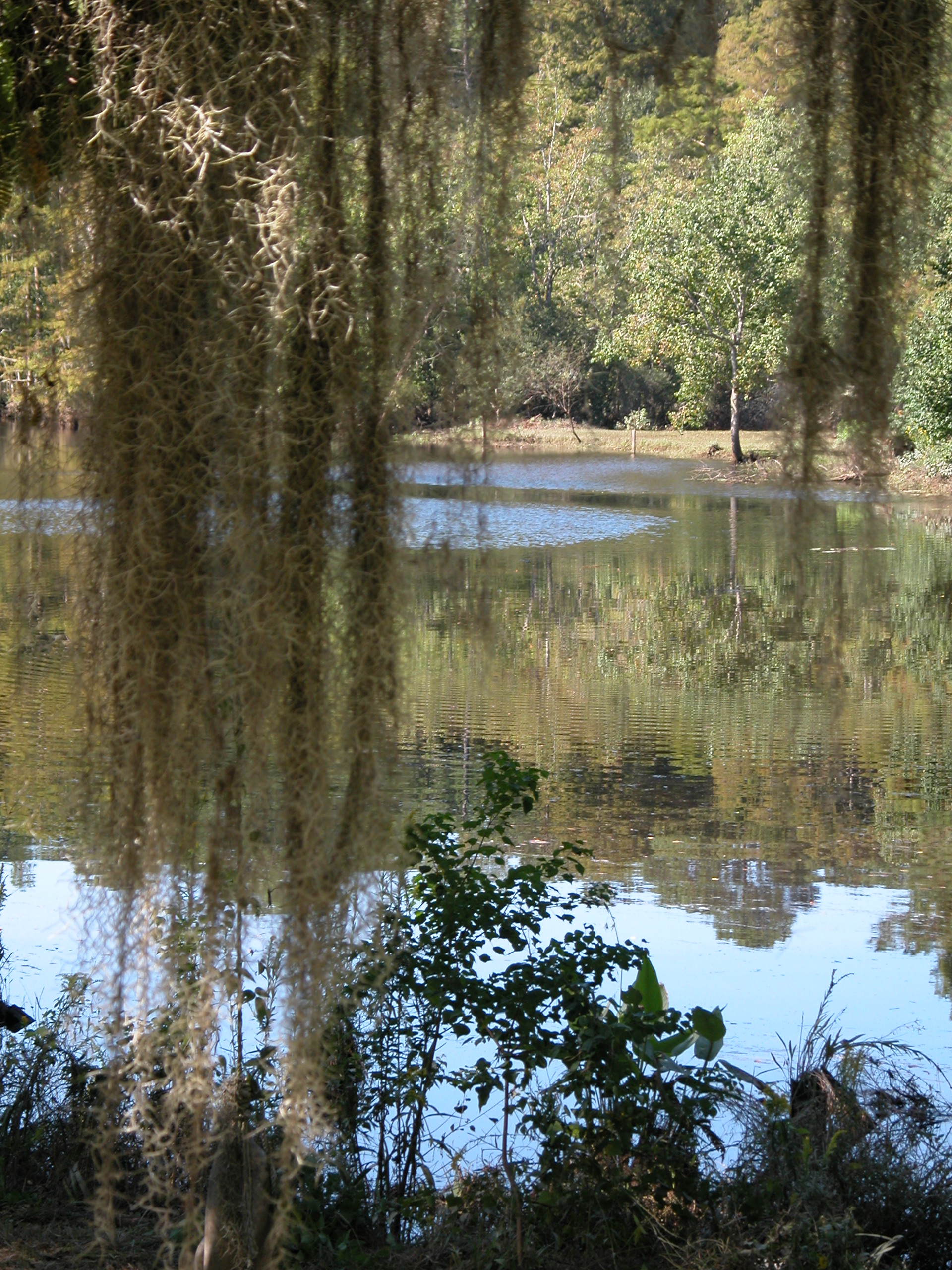
The Camp Salmen Nature Park Property, on which the Camp Salmen House is located, has almost one-half mile of frontage along Bayou Liberty.

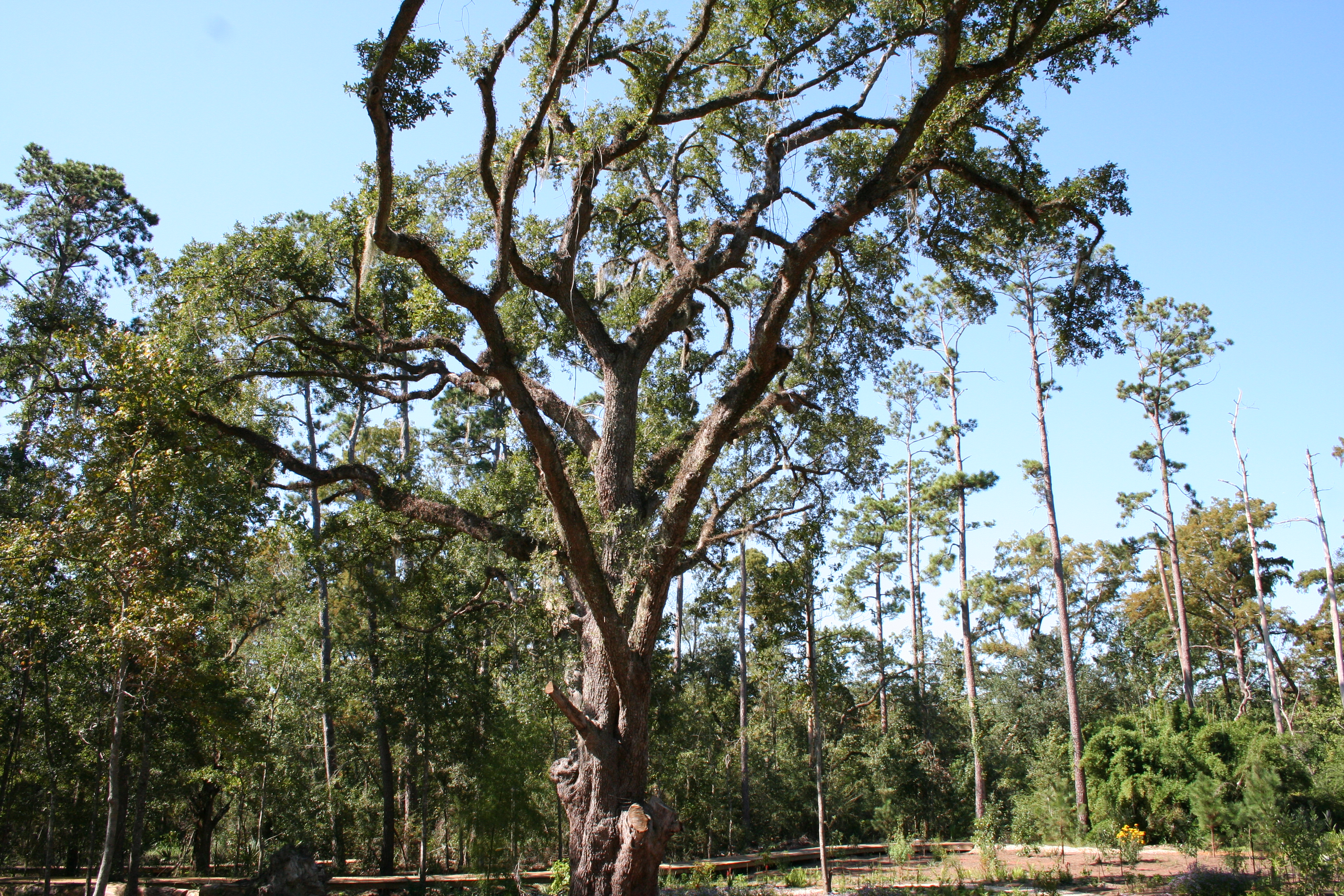
The Camp Salmen Live Oak is 22.00 feet in girth and registered with the Live Oak Society.

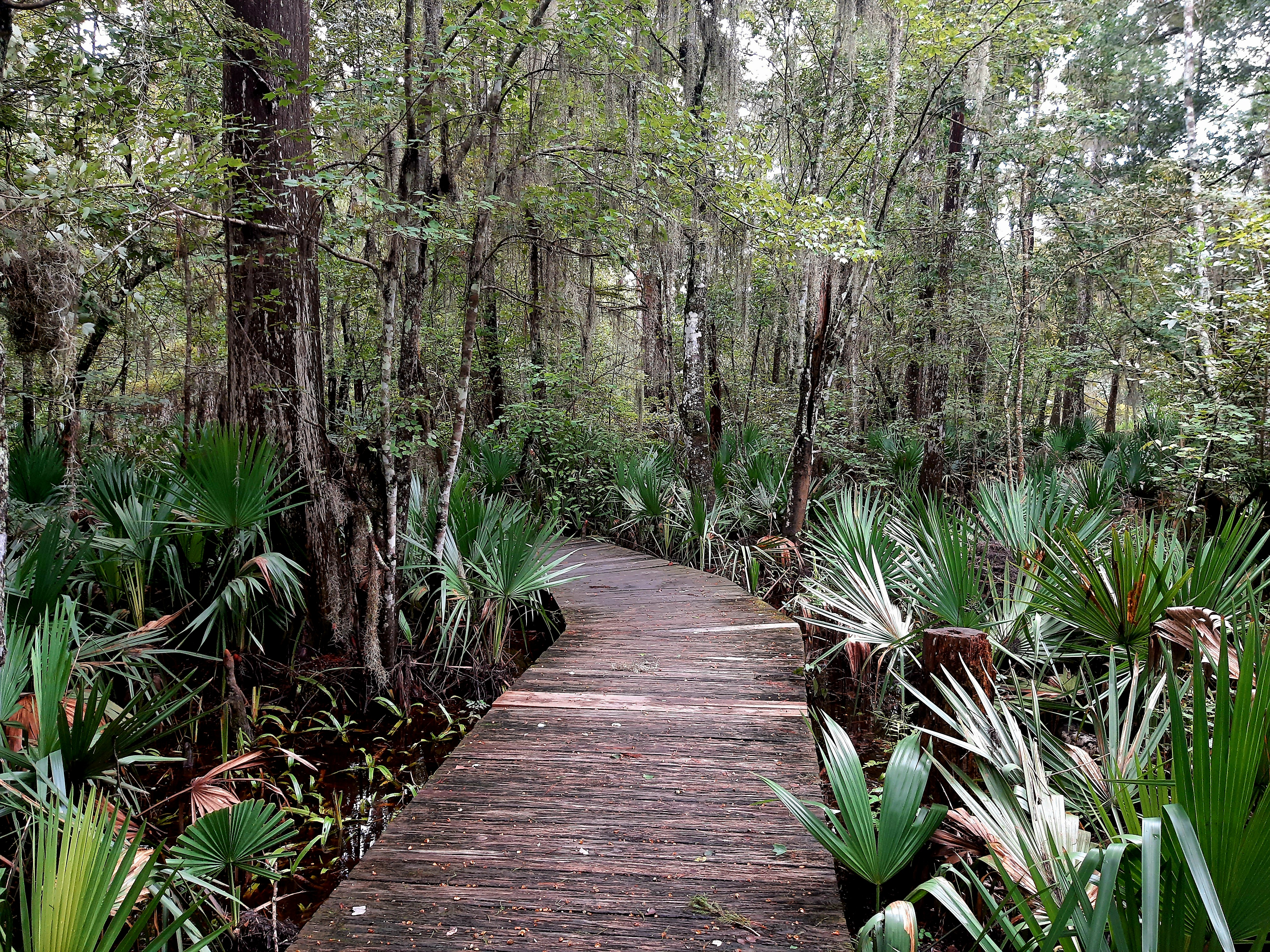
Wooden boardwalk trail at Camp Salmen Nature Park
