= Dendinger House =

Historic house in Louisiana, United States

- U.S. National Register of Historic Places
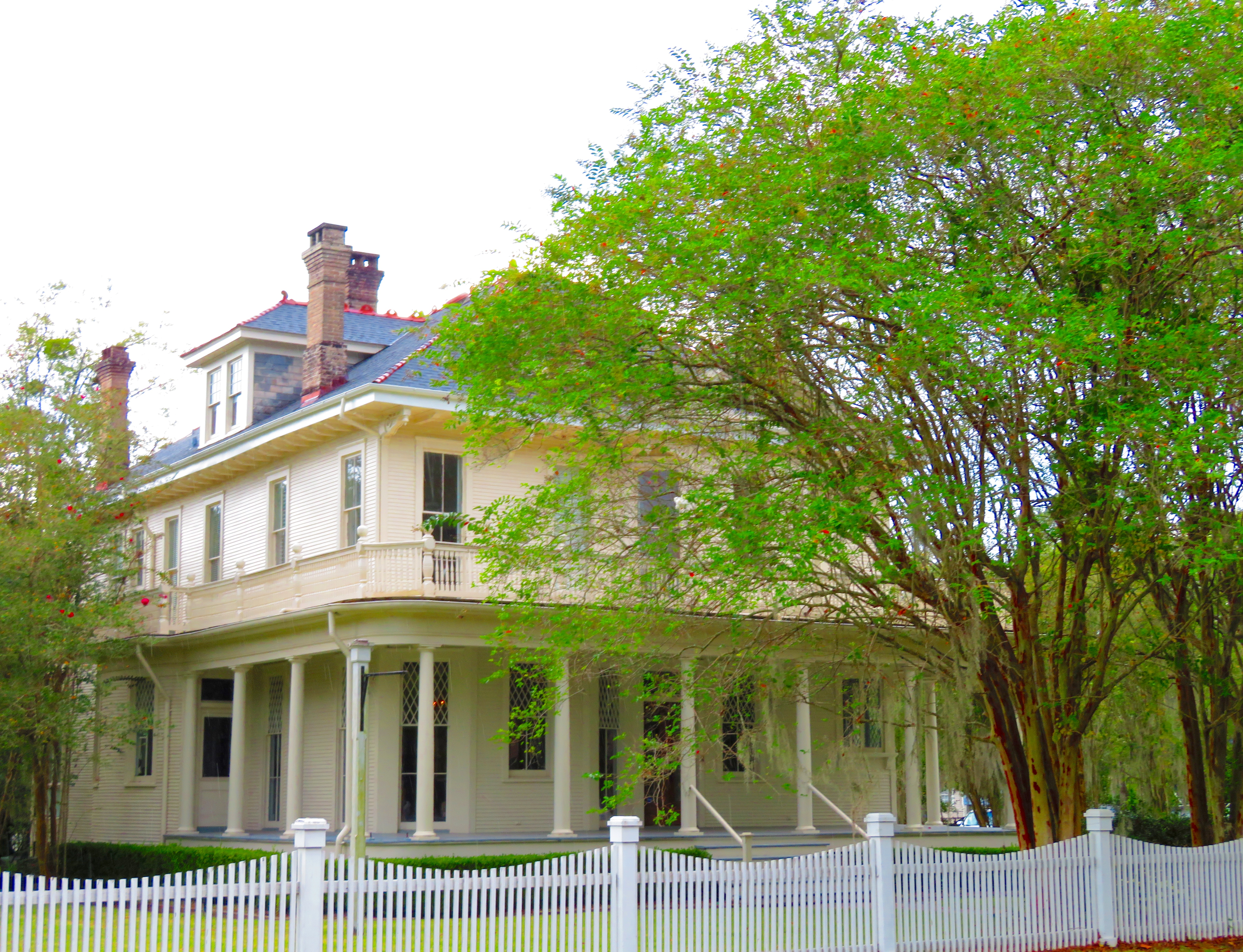

- Location within Louisiana Location within the United States
- Location: 206 Covington St., Madisonville, Louisiana
- Coordinates: 30°24′36″N 90°9′38″W
- Area: 1.5 acres (0.61 ha)
- Built: 1911
- Built by: Jenkins Bros.
- Architectural style: Colonial Revival, Queen Anne
- NRHP reference No.: 92001252
- Added to NRHP: September 22, 1992

Dendinger House, in Madisonville, Louisiana, is a historic house built in 1911. It has also been known as Regent Square. It was listed on the National Register of Historic Places in 1992. It is significant as one of only two landmark buildings in Madisonville from the 1890–1920 era.

It is a central hall plan house which shows influence of both Colonial Revival and Queen Anne styles. Queen Anne elements include its two hexagonal bays, fishscale shingles in the front gable, and a wraparound gallery. Colonial Revival elements include two elliptical bays and the Tuscan columns of the gallery.

A second contributing building in the listing is an outbuilding that served as a laundry, garage, and servants' quarters, which was built at the same time as the house.

The house was built for Theodore Dendinger, Sr., a businessman whose New Orleans–based businesses operated boats and schooners between New Orleans and Madisonville and included the Madison Lumber Company. In 1992 the house served as headquarters of an interior design company but was still in Dendinger family ownership.
