= Moore House (Mandeville, Louisiana) =

Historic home in Louisiana

- U.S. National Register of Historic Places
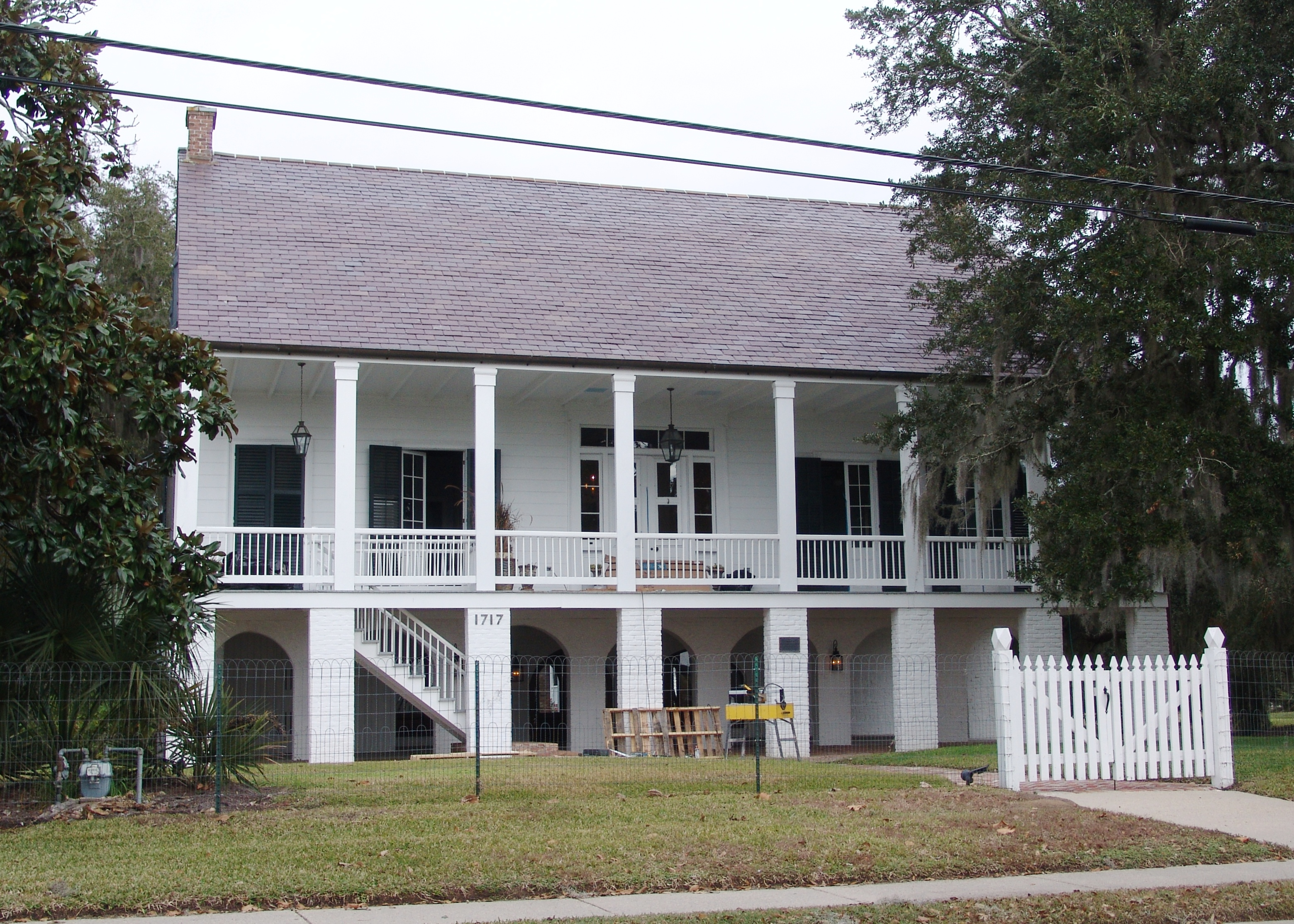

- Location within Louisiana
- Location: 1717 Lakeshore Dr., Mandeville, Louisiana
- Coordinates: 30°21′03″N 90°03′52″W
- Area: less than one acre
- Built: 1849
- NRHP reference No.: 83000545
- Added to NRHP: April 20, 1983

The Moore House, in Mandeville in St. Tammany Parish, Louisiana, was built around 1849. At 1717 Lakeshore Drive, it overlooks Lake Pontchartrain. It was listed on the National Register of Historic Places in 1983. It is at 1717 Lakeshore Drive. It became known as High Tide. Built by William Nott, it was completed in 1849.

The property was sold with riparian rights. Nott lost the property in a tax sale after the Civil War in 1867 and was unable to regain the property in a lawsuit in 1869.

Nott's brother George Washington Nott owned Fontainebleau Plantation where, until the 1930s, a small town that appeared as Nott on maps included a railroad stop, post office.

== Architecture ==
Described as the "finest of a small group of the oldest surviving structures in the town of Mandeville" among "quarters type" structures or "overseers houses", it "would stand as a full fledged plantation house."

== See also ==
- National Register of Historic Places listings in St. Tammany Parish, Louisiana
