= Fredericks House (Prescott, Arizona) =

Historic house in Arizona, United States

- U.S. National Register of Historic Places
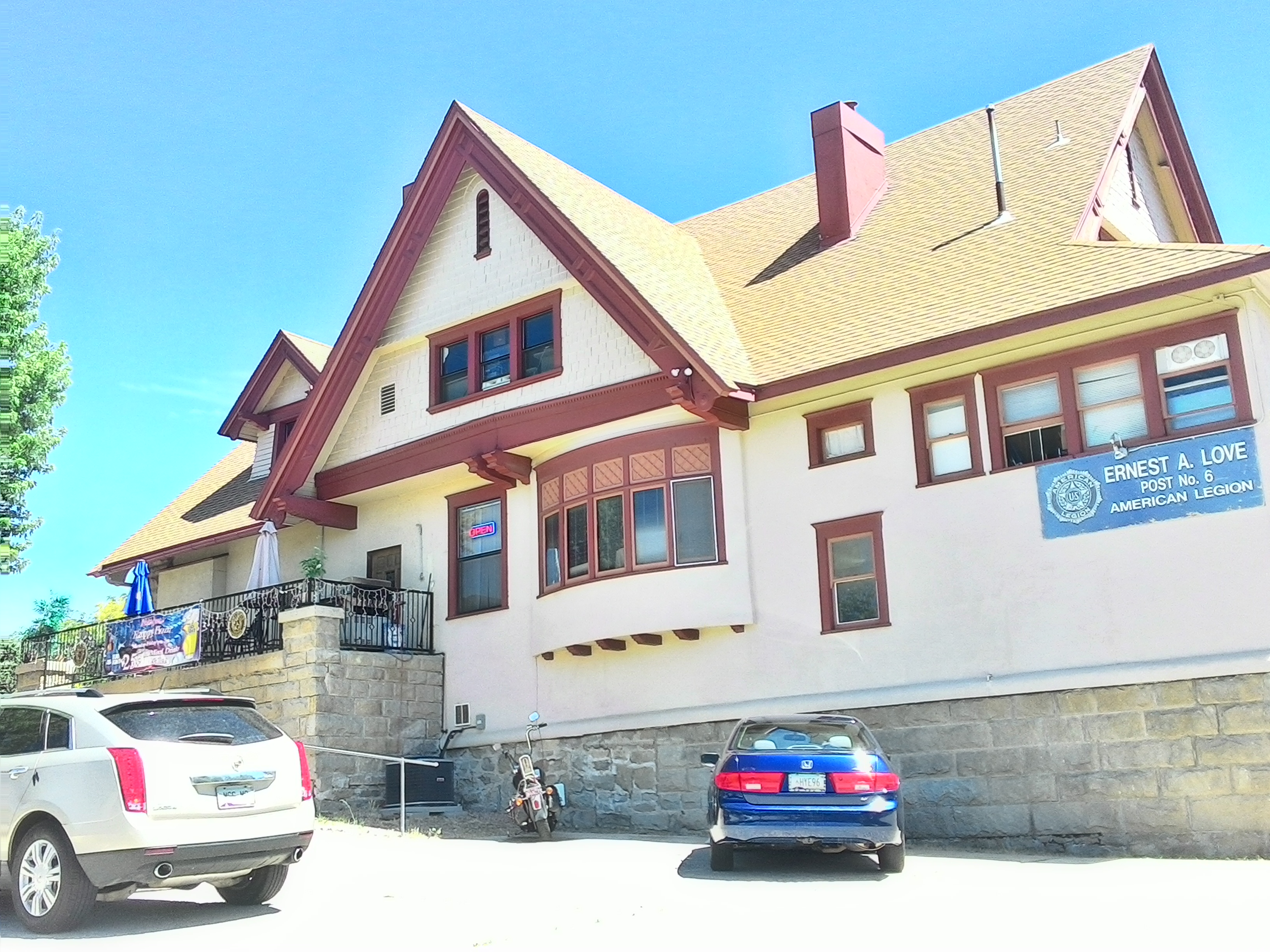
- Fredericks House North Side (Goodwin Street)

- Location within Arizona Location within the United States
- Location: 202 S. Pleasant, Prescott, Arizona
- Coordinates: 34.53963°N 112.46496°W
- Built: 1902-03
- MPS: Prescott Territorial Buildings MRA
- NRHP reference No.: 78003229
- Added to NRHP: December 14, 1978

The Fredericks House in Prescott, Arizona was built during 1902–03. It was listed on the National Register of Historic Places in 1978.

It is a "stylistically ambiguous" one-and-a-half-story house built for banker and capitalist R.N. Fredericks. He served as president of the Prescott National Bank and had extensive personal investments. As of 2020, the home serves as the home of the Earnest A. Love American Legion Post No. 6.

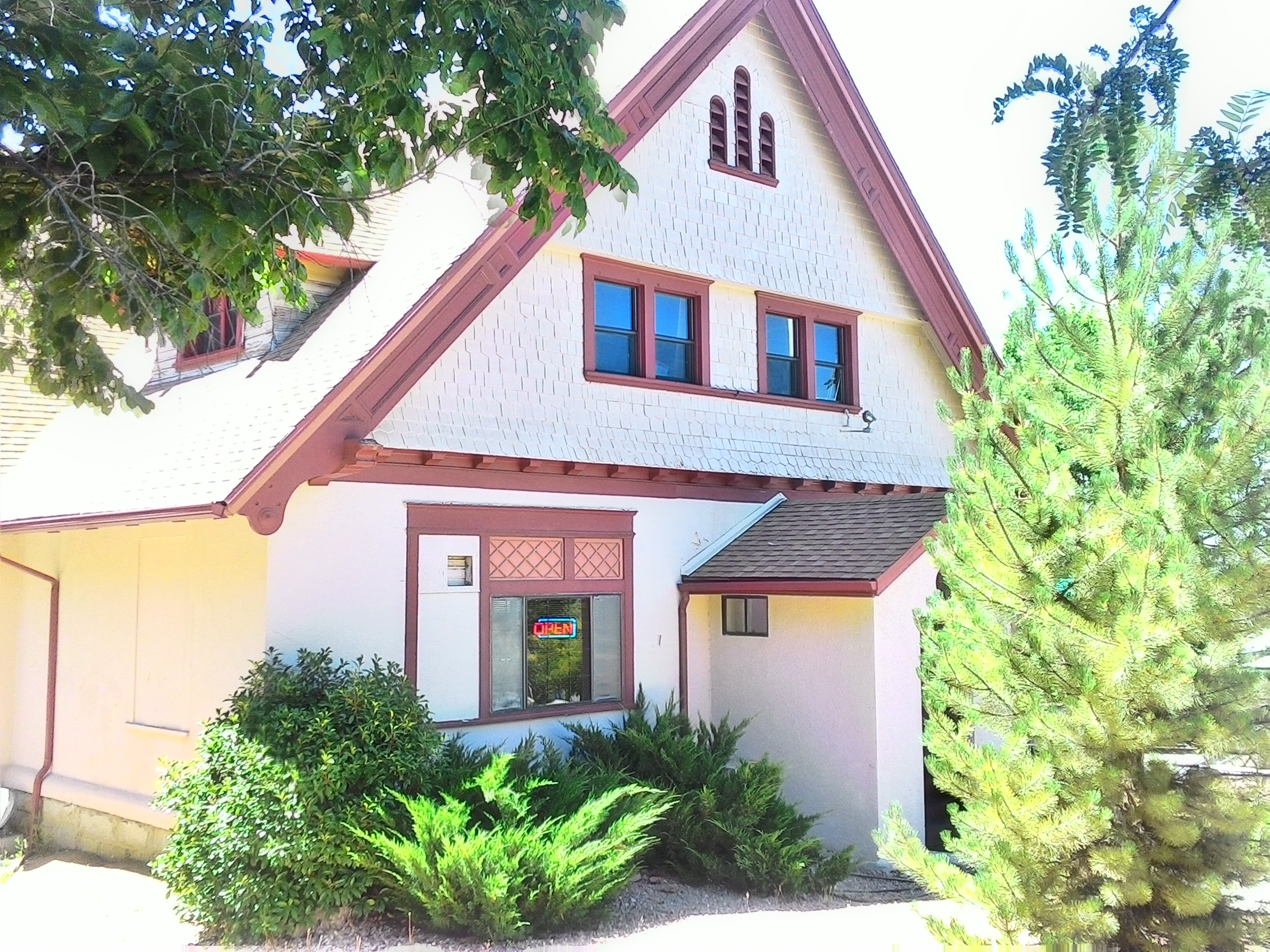
East Side (Pleasant Street)
