= Morel-Nott House =

- U.S. National Register of Historic Places
- Location within Louisiana
- Location: Lakefront Dr., Mandeville, Louisiana
- Coordinates: 30.35851°N 90.07936°W
- Built: c.1830
- Architectural style: French Creole architecture, Creole cottage
- NRHP reference No.: 80004254
- Added to NRHP: June 6, 1980

The Morel-Nott House, on Lake Pontchartrain in Mandeville in St. Tammany Parish, Louisiana, was listed on the National Register of Historic Places in 2019.

It is a French Creole raised cottage which was built in the 1830s or 1840s. It was moved to its present location on the edge of Mandeville in 1965 in order to preserve it. It is an example of Creole architecture in the United States.
