= Dew Drop Social and Benevolent Hall =

- U.S. National Register of Historic Places
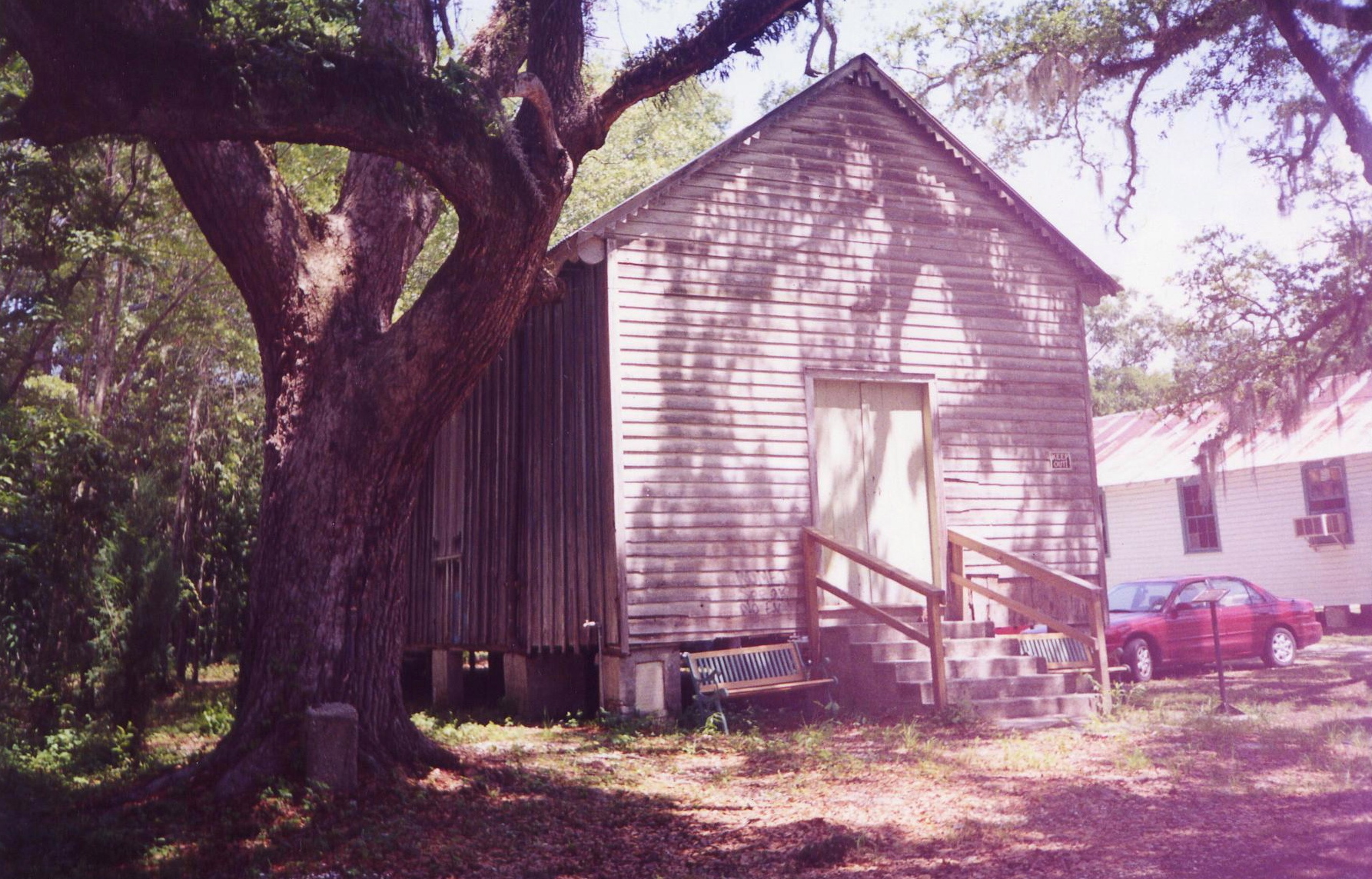

- Location within Louisiana
- Location: 430 Lamarque St., Mandeville, Louisiana
- Coordinates: 30°21′20″N 90°03′44″W
- Area: less than one acre
- Built: 1895
- NRHP reference No.: 00001145
- Added to NRHP: September 22, 2000

The Dew Drop Social and Benevolent Hall, in Mandeville, Louisiana, was built in 1895. It was home of the 1885-founded mutual assistance/social organization, the "Dew Drop Social and Benevolent No. 2 of Mandeville". it served as a meeting hall and as the venue for dances.

It was listed on the National Register of Historic Places in 2000.

It is located on the 400 block of Lamarque St. in Mandeville.

It was deemed significant "as a major center of social life for African-Americans in the Mandeville area. It is also of significance within southern Louisiana as a rare surviving African-American benevolent association hall. Because all available evidence indicates that the building's heyday as a social center and benevolent association hall ended c.1940, that date is being used to end the period of significance."
