= Haaswood, Louisiana =

- Unincorporated community
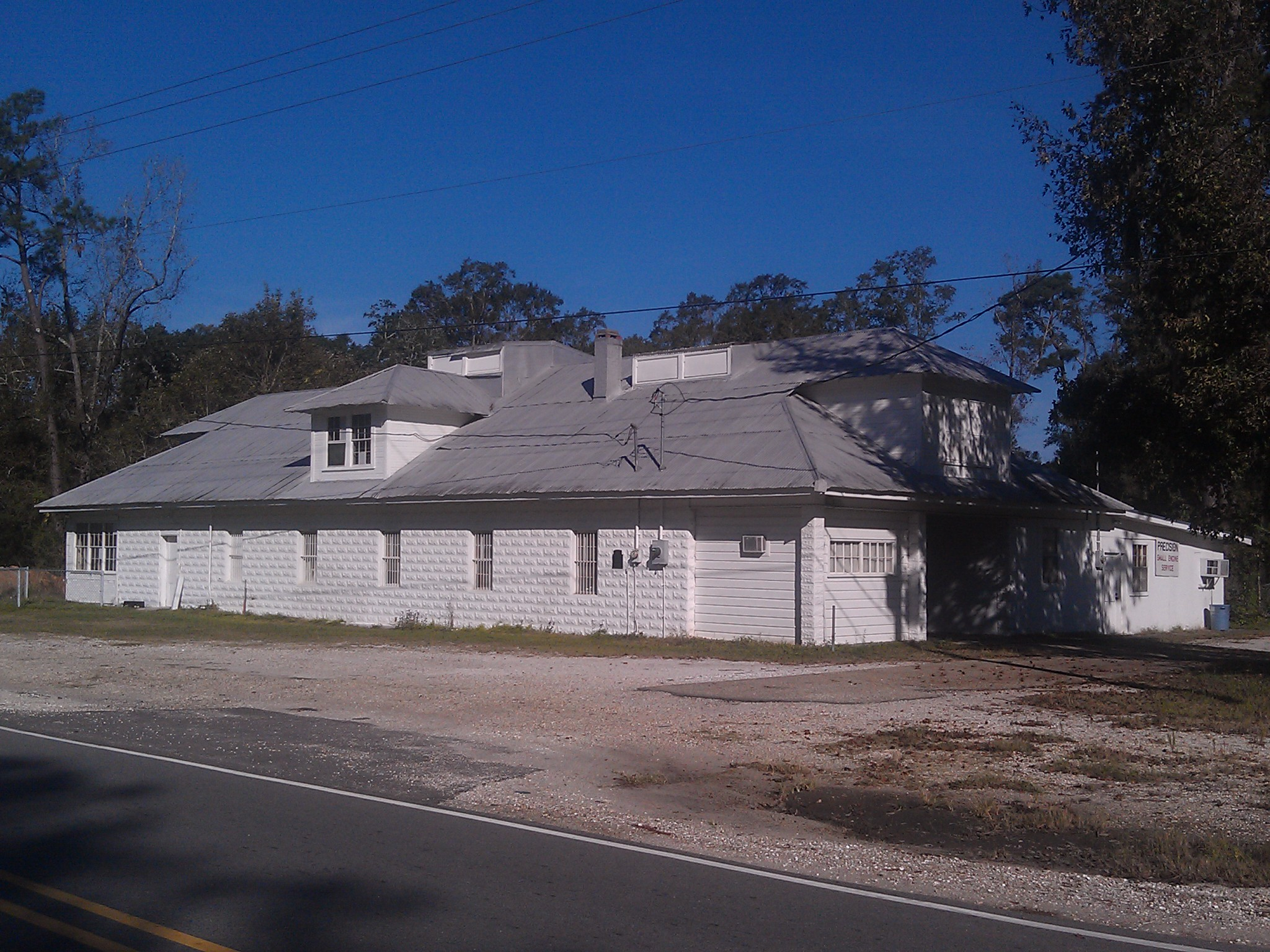
- The historic Haaswood Store

- Location within Louisiana Location within the United States
- Coordinates: 30°25′00″N 89°49′54″W
- Country: United States
- State: Louisiana
- Parish: St. Tammany
- Elevation: 23 ft (7.0 m)
- Time zone: UTC-6 (Central (CST))
  - Summer (DST): UTC-5 (CDT)
- ZIP code: 70452
- Area code: 985
- GNIS feature ID: 560924
- FIPS code: 22-32370

Haaswood is an unincorporated community in St. Tammany Parish, Louisiana, United States. The community is located 3 mi (4.8 km) north-northeast of Slidell on Louisiana Highway 1091 and 1 mi (1.6 km) miles east of Alton. The Haaswood Store, a 1930 historic retail building, is on the National Register of Historic Places.
