= Haaswood Store =

- U.S. National Register of Historic Places
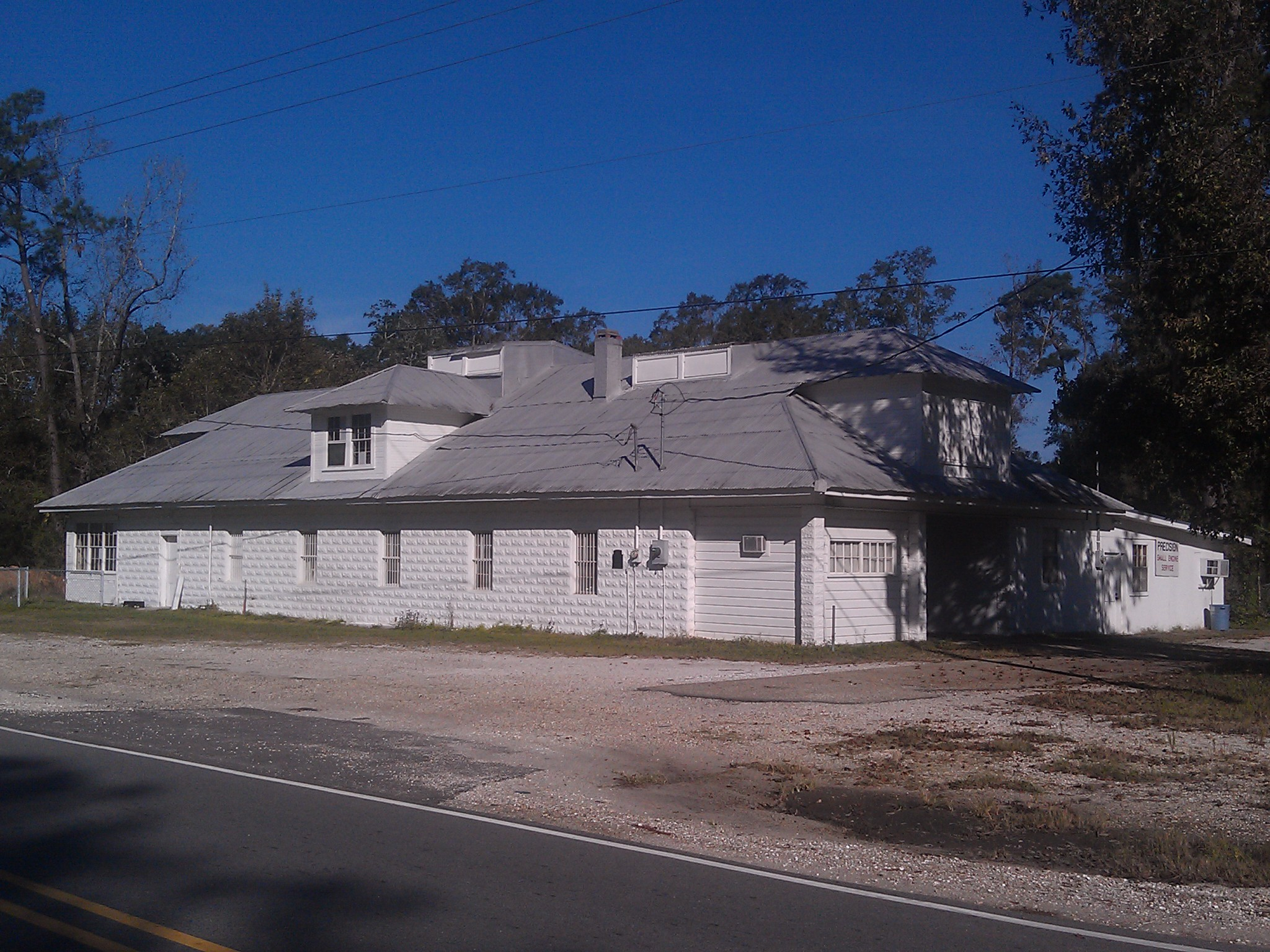

- Location within Louisiana
- Nearest city: Pearl River, Louisiana
- Coordinates: 30°20′06″N 89°44′52″W
- Area: 1.1 acres (0.45 ha)
- Built: 1930
- NRHP reference No.: 09000518
- Added to NRHP: July 15, 2009

The Haaswood Store, at 62011 Louisiana Highway 1091 in St. Tammany Parish, Louisiana, near Pearl River, Louisiana, was built in 1930. It was listed on the National Register of Historic Places in 2009.

The store was in operation into the 1960s. The building is a one-and-one-half-story store at an intersection in the unincorporated community of Haaswood, Louisiana. It is built with wood frame and cast concrete blocks.
