= Madisonville Bank =

- U.S. National Register of Historic Places
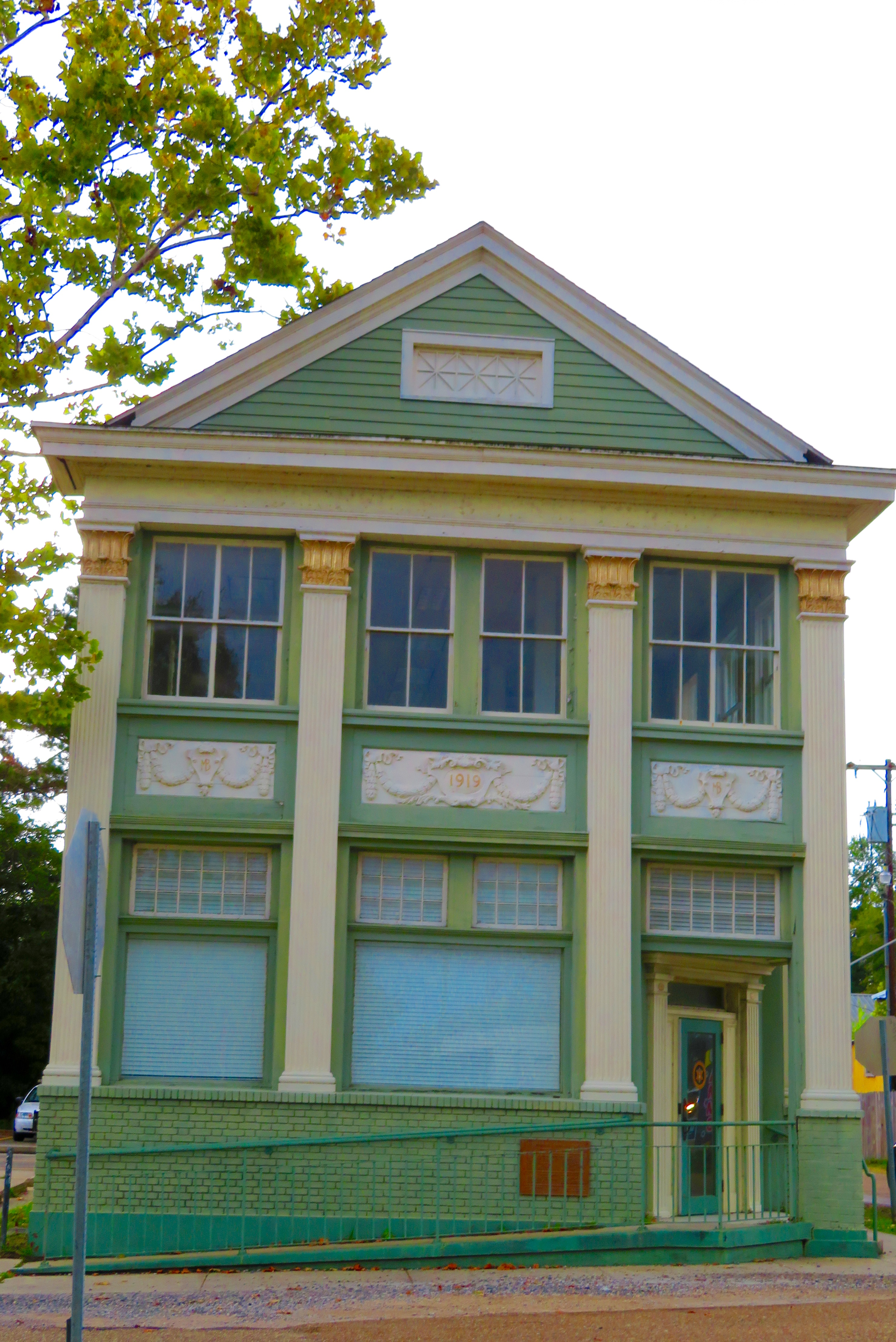

- Location within Louisiana
- Location: 400 Cedar St., Madisonville, Louisiana
- Coordinates: 30.40784°N 90.15920°W
- Area: less than one acre
- Built: c.1900,1919
- NRHP reference No.: 00001145
- Added to NRHP: December 28, 1983

The Madisonville Bank, in Madisonville, Louisiana, was built around 1900 and renovated extensively in 1919.

It is located on the corner of Cedar Street and E. St. John Street, a corner also swept by Covington/Louisiana Highway 21/Louisiana Highway 1077. It was built as a two-story gable-front building with simple storefront and a corner entrance. It gained a detailed classical wraparound storefront on two sides in 1919. This includes square pilasters with Corinthian capitals defining three bays on the front and three on the side.

It is questionable whether a brick dado (lower wall) on its front dates from the 1919 renovation; it seems incompatible.

Its interior includes its original pressed tin ceiling and original bank vault.

It is one of two architecturally significant buildings from the 1890-1920 era surviving in Madisonville; the other is a large Queen Anne house. It was listed on the National Register of Historic Places in 1983.

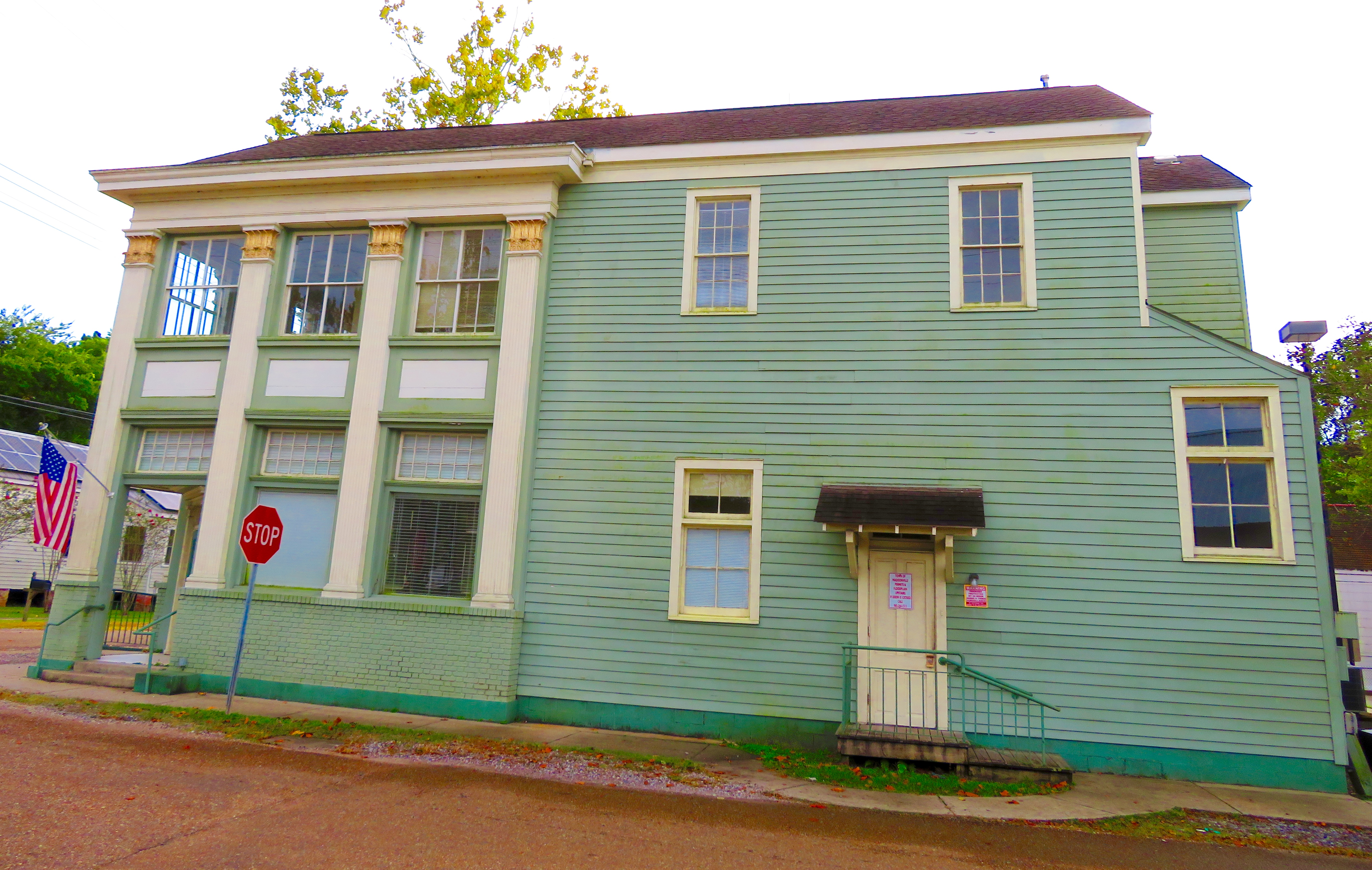
Side view

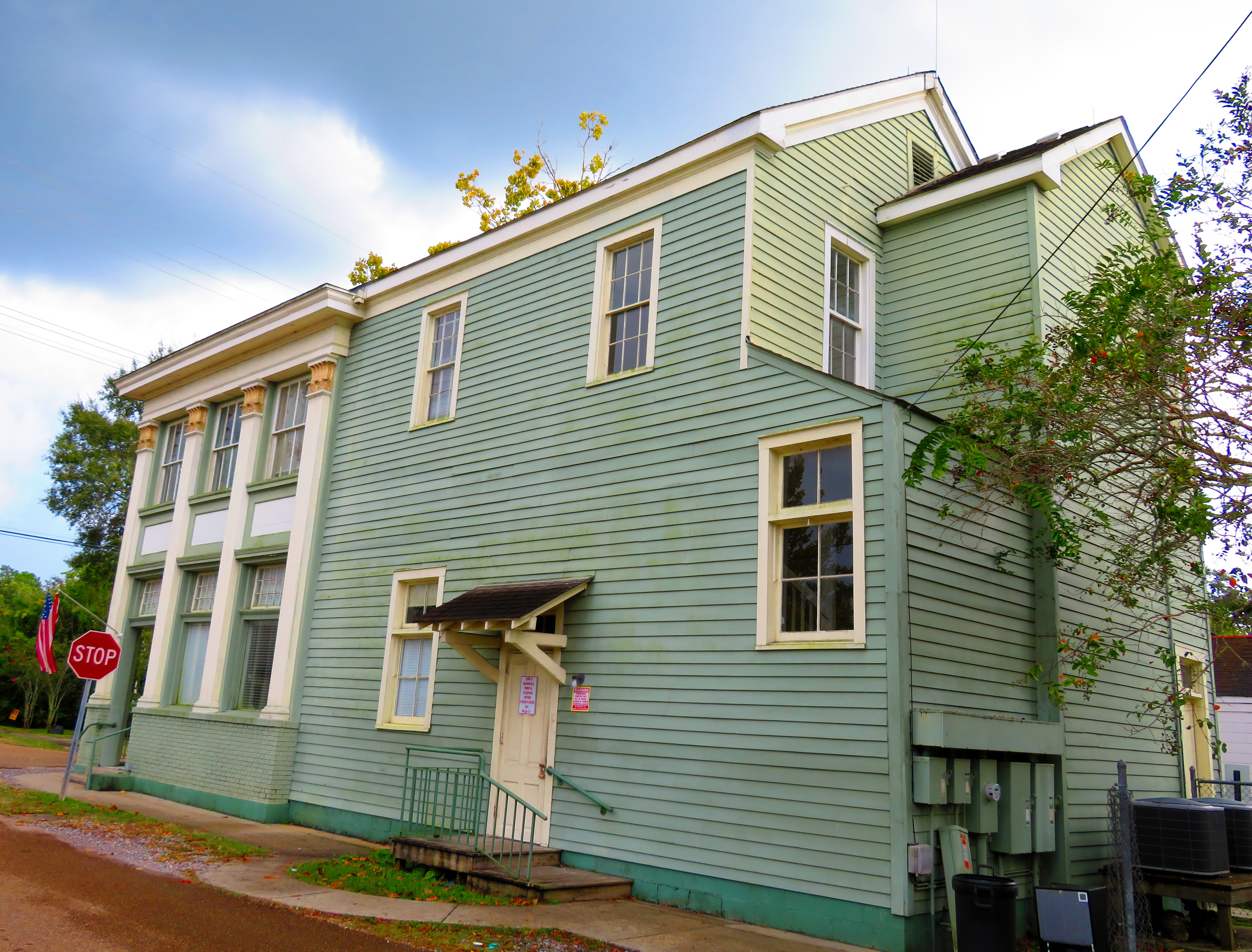
Side view

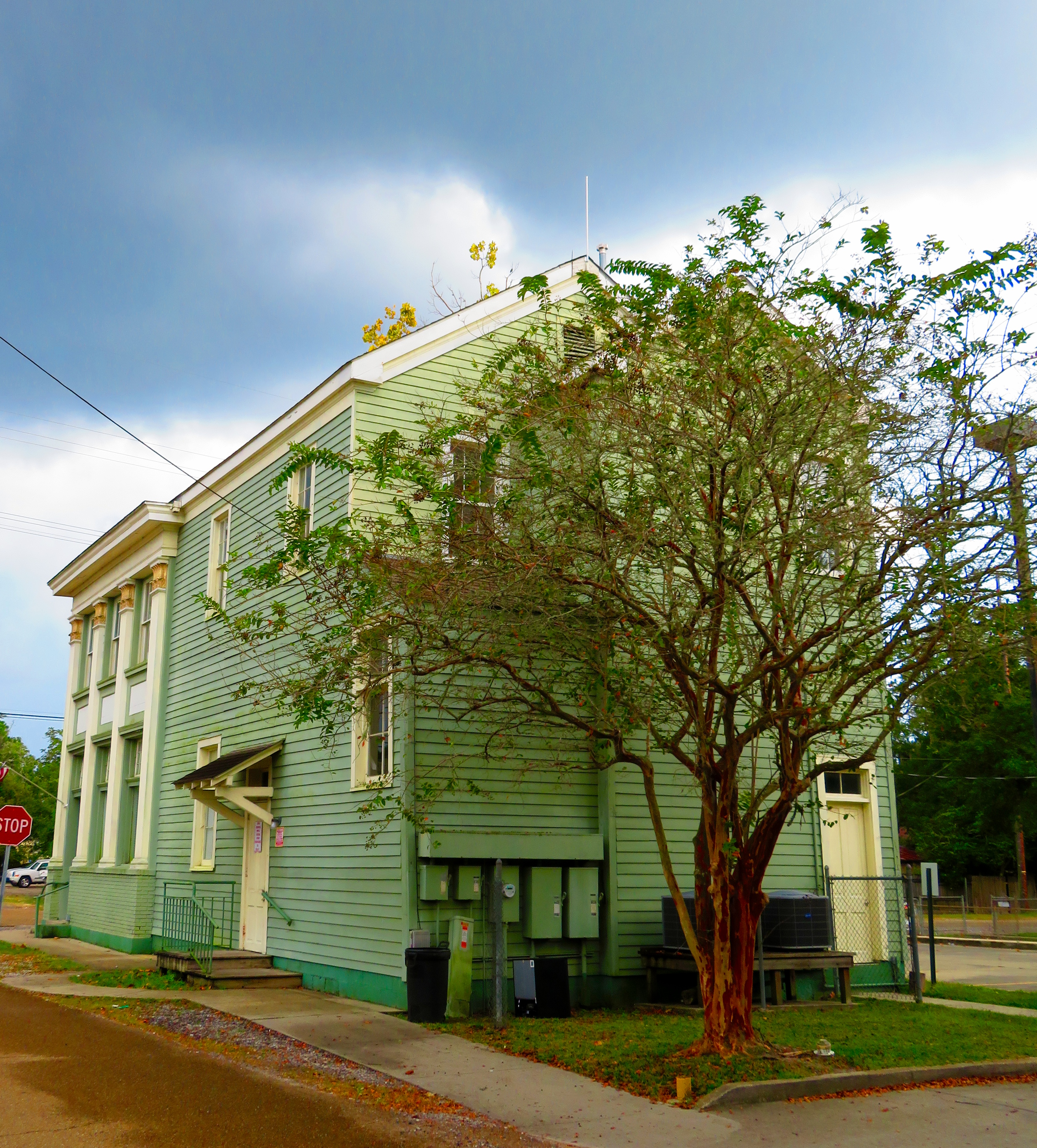
Rear view

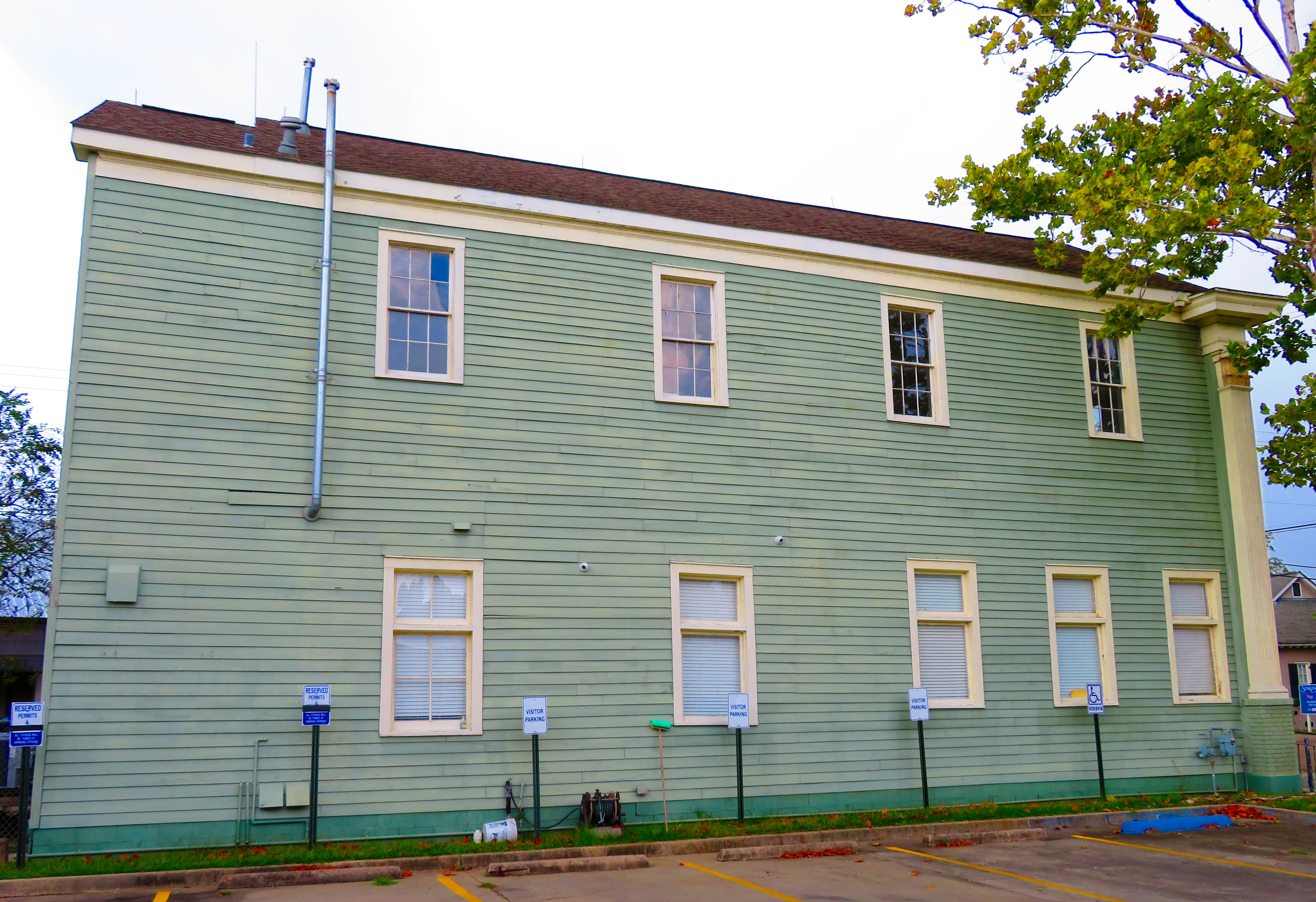
Side view
