= Frederick House (Covington, Louisiana) =

- U.S. National Register of Historic Places
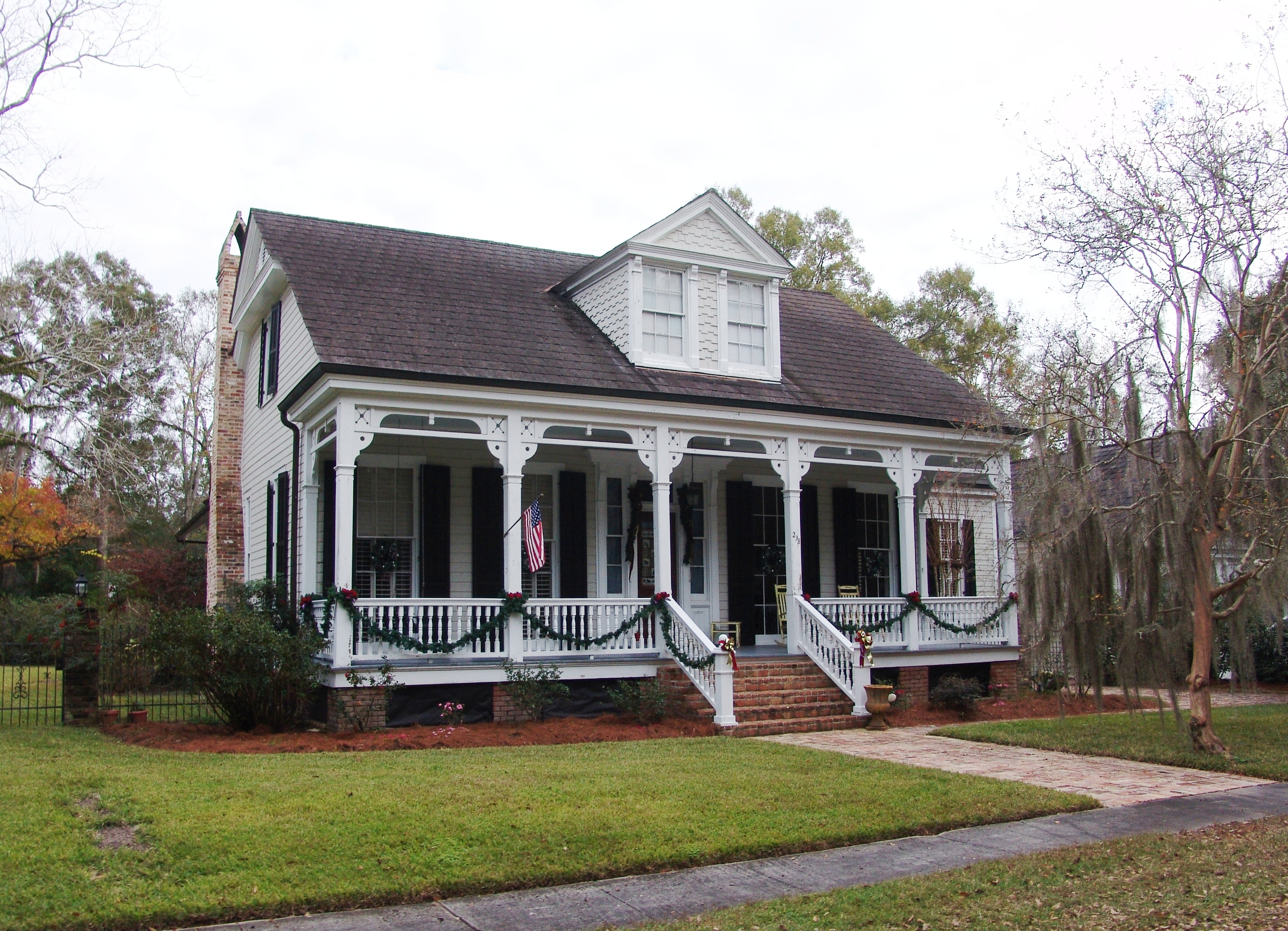

- Location within Louisiana
- Location: 238 Vermont St., Covington, Louisiana
- Coordinates: 30°28′14″N 90°05′48″W
- Area: less than one acre
- Built: 1890
- Architectural style: Queen Anne, Stick/eastlake
- NRHP reference No.: 82004624
- Added to NRHP: August 11, 1982

The Frederick House, at 238 Vermont St. in Covington, Louisiana, is a one-and-half-story raised house built around 1890. It was listed on the National Register of Historic Places in 1982.

It was built by Emile "Boss" Frederick (d. 1945), who was a Covington politician while living in the house.

It has Queen Anne and Stick/Eastlake ornamentation.
