= Bertus-Ducatel House =

- U.S. National Register of Historic Places
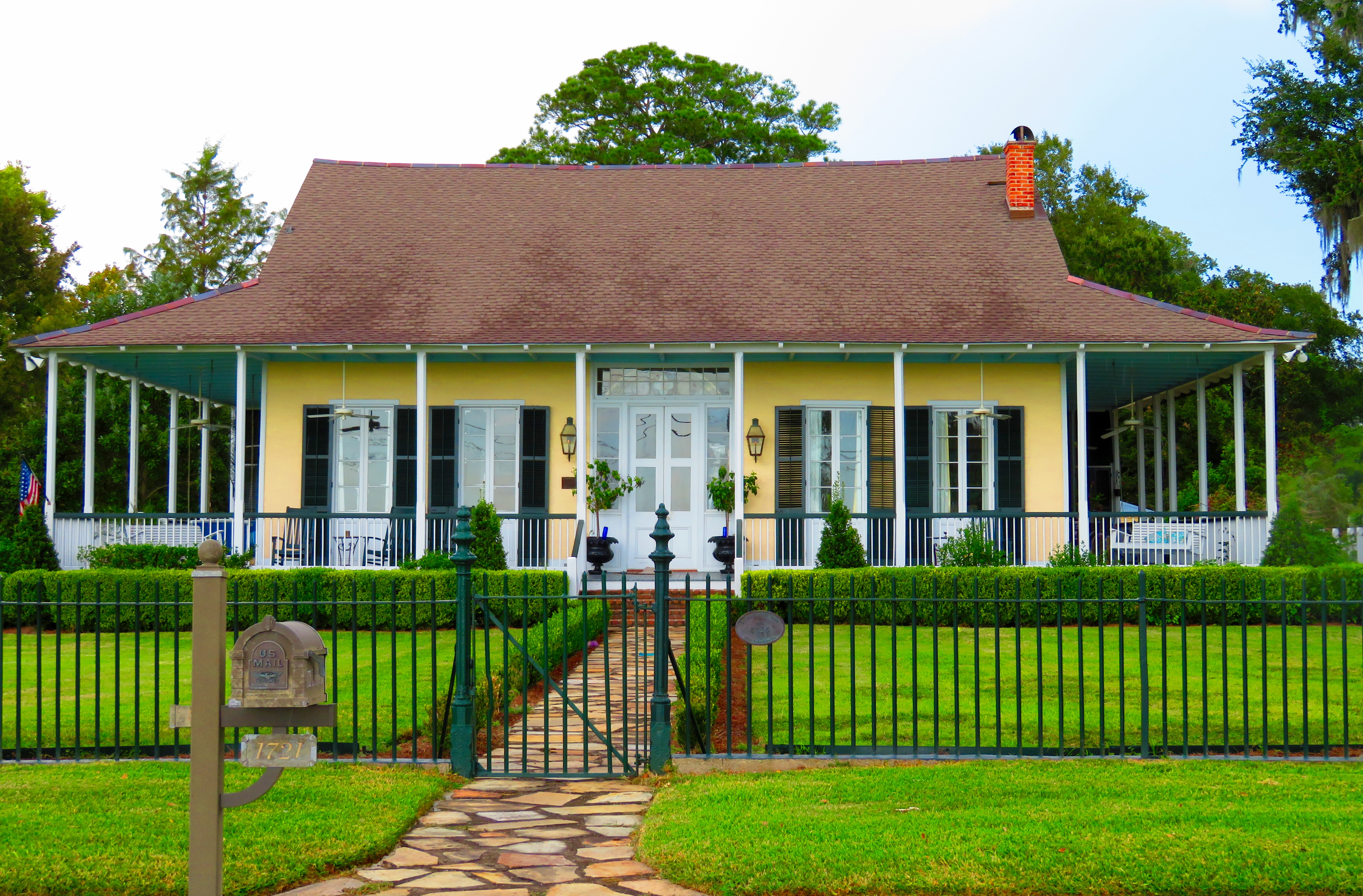

- Location within Louisiana
- Location: 1721 Lakeshore Dr., Mandeville, Louisiana
- Coordinates: 30°21′03″N 90°03′52″W
- Area: 1 acre (0.40 ha)
- Built: c.1839
- Architectural style: French Creole
- MPS: Louisiana's French Creole Architecture MPS
- NRHP reference No.: 98000182
- Added to NRHP: March 5, 1998

The Bertus-Ducatel House, at 1721 Lakeshore Dr. in Mandeville, Louisiana, was built around 1839. It was listed on the National Register of Historic Places in 1998.

It is French Creole in style. It was built with brick-between-post (briquette entre poteaux) construction, which is rare in the United States outside of New Orleans.

It has also been known as Little Flower Villa.
