= Griffin's Bakery =

- U.S. National Register of Historic Places
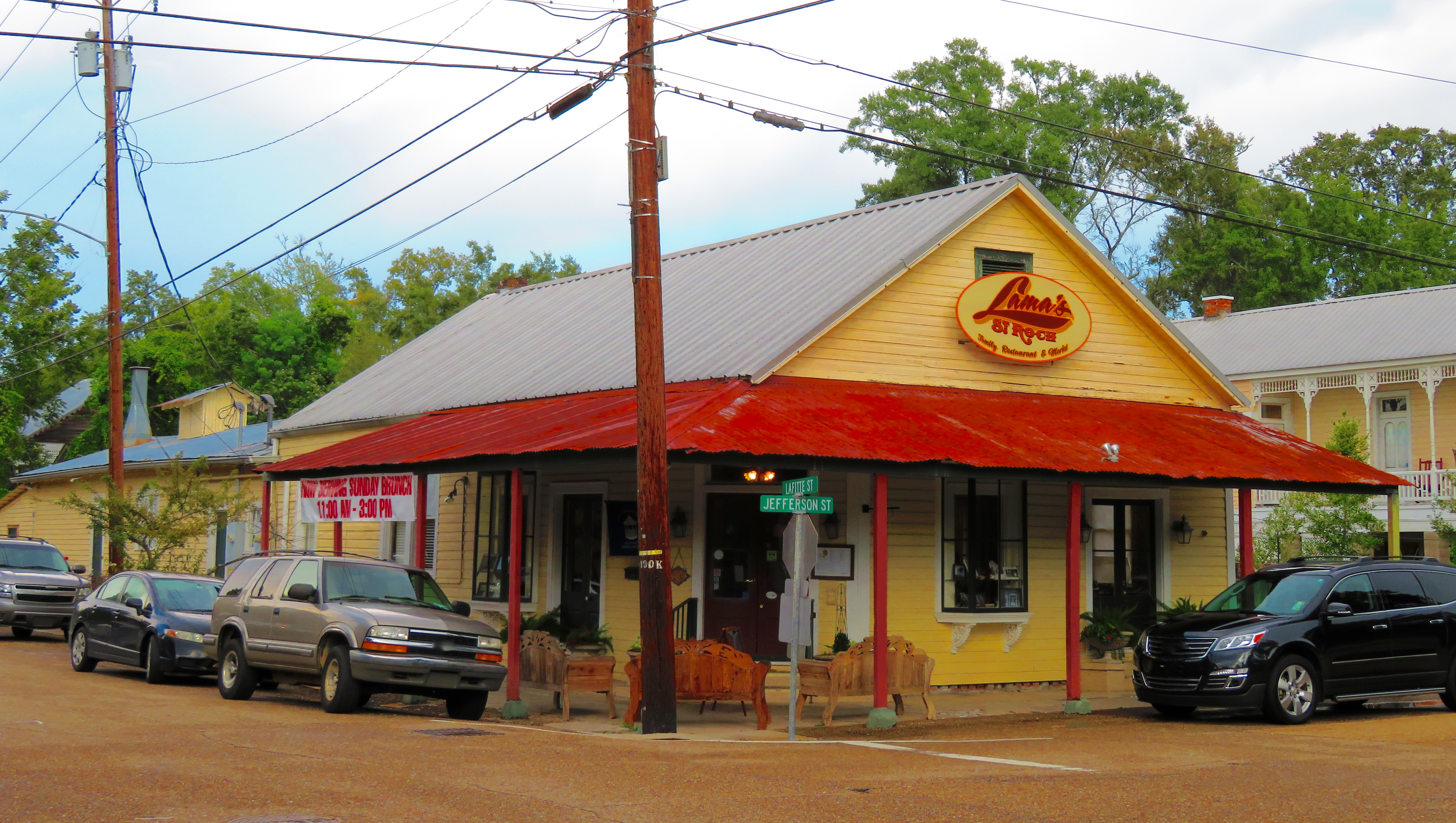

- Location within Louisiana
- Location: 301 Lafitte St., Mandeville, Louisiana
- Coordinates: 30.355833°N 90.0675°W
- Area: less than one acre
- Built: c.1900
- NRHP reference No.: 97001423
- Added to NRHP: December 1, 1997

The Griffin's Bakery, in Mandeville in St. Tammany Parish, Louisiana, was built around 1900. It is a galleried corner commercial building located two blocks from Lake Pontchartrain in "Old Mandeville", a late nineteenth/early twentieth century neighborhood. It was built c.1900 and "evolved into its present appearance by the mid-1930s."

It was listed on the National Register of Historic Places in 1997. It was deemed locally significant as "one of few buildings remaining to represent the commercial history of Mandeville. Additionally, it is particularly important because it personifies the look of old Mandeville."

It is located on the corner of Jefferson St. and Lafitte St. in Mandeville.
