= List of Louisiana state parks =

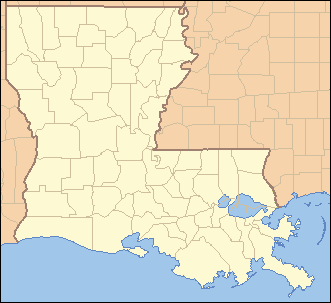
Map of state parks maintained by the Office of State Parks
(Each dot is linked to the corresponding park article)

The US state of Louisiana has 21 state parks, which are governed by the Office of Lieutenant Governor, a division of the Louisiana Department of Culture, Recreation and Tourism. Louisiana's state park system began in 1934 when the state passed legislation that created the State Parks Commission of Louisiana. In 1952, legislation broadened the role of the commission to include the development of outdoor recreation programs and resources. The commission was renamed to the Louisiana State Parks and Recreation Commission. In 1977, the Office of State Parks was created in the Department of Culture, Recreation, and Tourism.

After the State Parks Commission of Louisiana was formed in 1934, 7 sites were acquired for use as state parks. During World War II, the rate of new park acquisition declined with the addition of only one new site, Sam Houston Jones State Park in 1944. In 1966, the National Park Service reviewed Louisiana's state parks system and made many recommendations, which led to specific guidelines and requirements for state parks. Over time, many state parks that did not meet these guidelines were either reclassified as state historic sites or were turned over to local or state agencies. Some of these parks include Lac des Allemands, Saline Bayou, and Black Lake. During the 1970s, government management of the state parks was restructured. The Office of State Parks was created, and 2 new parks were acquired. From 1995 to 2009, $80 million were invested in creating new facilities, or updating existing facilities.

Louisiana state parks are selected on the criteria that they must be natural areas of unique or exceptional scenic value. Many of the state parks also have historic or scientific importance. For example, Chemin-A-Haut State Park served as a route used by Native Americans during seasonal migrations. Louisiana state parks have many accommodations, including overnight cabins, boating rentals, guided daily tours, and fishing piers. In 2002, Louisiana state parks had more than 2 million visitors. With the addition of Palmetto Island State Park in 2010, Louisiana state parks comprise more than 30,000 acres (12,000 ha) of land.

== Current parks ==
Park name	Parish	Size	Year Established	Remarks	Image
Bayou Segnette State Park	Jefferson	676 acres (274 ha)	1987	Bayou Segnette State Park features a wave pool.	A grey tent set up on Bayou Segnette park grounds
Bogue Chitto State Park	Washington	1,786 acres (723 ha)	2010	Bogue Chitto State Park, pronounced bo–guh chit–uh, contains 14 miles (23 km) of equestrian trails with the trailhead located near Fricke's Cave.	Beach cairs along the river at Bogue Chitto state park
Chemin-A-Haut State Park	Morehouse	503 acres (204 ha)	1935	The park was designed with children in mind and has two playgrounds at the day use area.	Canoes tied to a pole at Chemin-A-Haut state park
Chicot State Park	Evangeline	6,400 acres (2,590 ha)	1939	Chicot State Park contains the Louisiana State Arboretum, which has a mature beech–magnolia forest.	
Cypremort Point State Park	St. Mary	185 acres (75 ha)	1970	Most of the park is situated on a half-mile stretch of a man-made beach.	An outside pavilion on the grass
Fairview-Riverside State Park	St. Tammany	98 acres (40 ha)	1962	The Otis house, listed on the National Register of Historic Places, is located in the park.	A two-story light yellow plantation home
Fontainebleau State Park	St. Tammany	2,800 acres (1,133 ha)	1942	The park was once the site of a sugar plantation and brick yard operated by Bernard de Marigny.	The sun setting over Lake Pontchartrain
Grand Isle State Park	Jefferson	140 acres (57 ha)	1968	Grand Isle State Park is the only state-owned and -operated beach on the Louisiana gulf coast.	A pier extending into the Gulf of Mexico
Jimmie Davis State Park	Jackson	294 acres (119 ha)	1996	Many of the largest bass caught in Louisiana have been in Caney Lake Reservoir which is in the park. As of 2010, the largest bass from Louisiana was caught at Caney Lake.	Two silhouetted people fishing on a boat
Lake Bistineau State Park	Webster	750 acres (304 ha)	1938	Lake Bistineau State Park is the first state park in Louisiana to accommodate African Americans, starting in 1956. The two separated areas are an artifact of the segregated nature of the park at the time.	Cypress trees covered in moss in reflective water
Lake Bruin State Park	Tensas	53 acres (21 ha)	1956	Lake Bruin State Park was originally established in 1928 as a fish hatchery.	A shaded area next to a small pier
Lake Claiborne State Park	Claiborne	643 acres (260 ha)	1974	Lake Claiborne State Park is situated on, but does not include, Lake Claiborne, the park's main attraction. When at full reservoir level, Lake Claiborne has a surface area of 6,400 acres (2,590 ha).	A pier extending out into the swamp
Lake D'Arbonne State Park	Union	655 acres (265 ha)	1967	Lake D'Arbonne State Park offers disc golf. The course is located near the group camp.	A lifeguard watching people swim in a pool
Lake Fausse Pointe State Park	Iberia and St. Martin	6,000 acres (2,428 ha)	1987	The site was once part of the Atchafalaya Basin and the surrounding land was once the home of the Chitimacha Native Americans.	A dried up swamp bed
North Toledo Bend State Park	Sabine	900 acres (364 ha)	1987	The park is situated on Toledo Bend Reservoir, the 5th largest in the nation by surface area.	An motor home set up with party lights on the outside
Palmetto Island State Park	Vermilion	1,299 acres (526 ha)	2010	The visitor center complex contains a water playground and a bathhouse.	A picture of a lake with dormant trees in the back
Poverty Point Reservoir State Park	Richland	2,700 acres (1,093 ha)	2005	Due to an active bear population, bear-proof containers are provided for waste disposal throughout the park.	A truck backing a boat into the water
St. Bernard State Park	St. Bernard	358 acres (145 ha)	1971	A local family business donated the land for the park to Louisiana in 1971.	A brown brick welcome center building
Sam Houston Jones State Park	Calcasieu	1,087 acres (440 ha)	1944	The park is located north of the most productive birding region of Louisiana. At certain times of year, nearly 200 species of birds can be seen within 30 miles (48 km) of the park.	Cypress trees in a swamp.
South Toledo Bend State Park	Vernon	1,000 acres (405 ha)	2004	South Toledo Bend State Park is a nesting ground for the bald eagle, which feeds from the supply of freshwater fish, including largemouth bass, catfish, bream, and white perch.	Visitor center surrounded by pine trees.
Tickfaw State Park	Livingston	1,200 acres (486 ha)	1999	Tickfaw State Park contains four distinct ecosystems: a cypress/tupelo swamp, a bottomland hardwood forest, a mixed pine/hardwood forest, and the Tickfaw River.	A small brook in a forest of cypress trees.

== Other names of current parks ==
The following are significantly different former or alternate names for current Louisiana state parks.

Former or alternate name	Parish	Current park name	Remarks
Caney Creek Lake State Park	Jackson	Jimmie Davis State Park	The park is located on Caney Lake Reservoir, which was created by damming Caney Creek in 1986. It was renamed in 2003.
Lake Bruin Wayside Park	Tensas	Lake Bruin State Park	Originally only a park, but when made a state park it was renamed in 1962.
Sam Houston State Park	Calcasieu	Sam Houston Jones State Park	Originally named for Sam Houston, but was renamed in honor of Sam Houston Jones, 46th Governor of Louisiana.
Tchefuncte State Park and Conservation Reservation	St. Tammany	Fontainebleau State Park	The land was originally owned by Bernard de Marigny who called the area Fontainebleau after a forest in Paris he admired. When designated a state park, Governor Richard W. Leche named it Tchefuncte State Park and Conservation Reservation, which was later reverted to Fontainebleau.

== Former state park ==
The following is a park that was officially recognized as a state park after the 1966 National Park Service review but was later removed.

Park name	Parish	Size	Date Established	Date Removed	Remarks	Image
Hodges Gardens State Park	Sabine	700 acres (283 ha)	1956	October 1, 2017	The park features a 225-acre man-made lake that was built in 1954. After a funding issue, the donated property was reverted to the A.J. and Nona Triggs Hodges Foundation.	A small pond surrounded by greenery

== See also ==
- List of Louisiana state historic sites
- Louisiana State Arboretum
- List of U.S. national parks
