= Lake Chicot =

Lake Chicot can refer to:

- Lake Chicot, Arkansas
- Lake Chicot, Louisiana
