= Fontainebleau State Park =

State park in Louisiana, United States

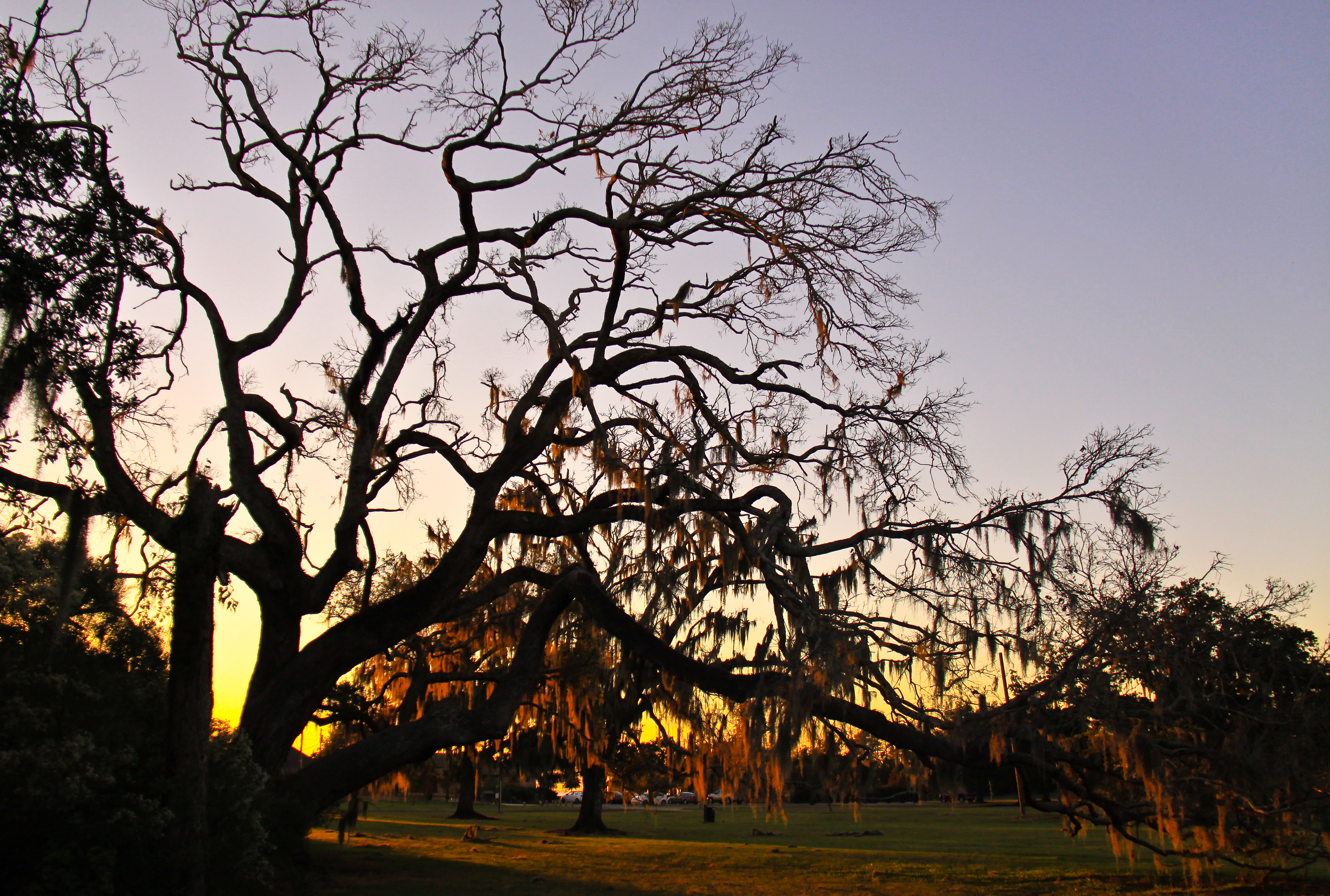
- Live oak tree draped with Spanish moss

- Location within Louisiana Location within the United States
- Location: St. Tammany Parish, Louisiana, United States
- Coordinates: 30.34523°N 90.02269°W
- Area: 2,800 acres (11 km^{2}; 4.4 sq mi)
- Established: 1942
- Visitors: 227,884 (in 2022)
- Governing body: Louisiana Office of State Parks
- Website: Official website

Fontainebleau State Park is located in St. Tammany Parish, Louisiana, on the north shore of Lake Pontchartrain. The park is 2,800 acres (1,100 ha) in size and was once the site of a sugar cane plantation and brickyard operated by Bernard de Marigny and later by his son Armand Marigny. The park has a multitude of habitats for birds.

== History ==
The visitor center highlights the history of the land which was once owned by the wealthy Bernard de Marigny (1785–1868) of New Orleans and founder of Mandeville, which lies directly to the west of Fontainebleau Park. Marigny operated a sugar mill that was built in 1829. He named his large holding Fontainebleau after the beautiful forest near Paris, France. In 1840, his son Armand documented the presence of 153 enslaved individuals at the site, including 57 children under the age of ten.

Fontainebleau State Park is surrounded on three sides by water: Lake Pontchartrain, Bayou Cane, and Bayou Castine. The state originally named the park Tchefuncte State Park and Conservation Reservation, after the Tchefuncte River.

The park was added to the National Register of Historic Places in 1999.

== Overnight features ==
- 12 cabins; six are handicapped-accessible including two that are ADA-compliant.
- 163 RV and tenting campsites, many with utilities
- Comfort stations with showers
- Playground
- Three group camps and a lodge
- Around 200 camping sites in total

== Day use facilities ==
- A 4.8-mile (7.7 km) hiking trail.
- A 1.2-mile (1.9 km) nature trail. The nature trail includes a boardwalk into the marsh.
- Picnic area and playground.
- Pavilion.
- Beach, fishing pond, and fishing pier.
- Visitor center with museum displays and interpretive programs.
- The Tammany Trace crosses Fontainebleau State Park. This is a rail-trail conversion of the old Illinois Central corridor, and is a 31 miles (50 km) paved trail for hiking, inline skating, and bicycling, with a parallel equestrian trail.

== See also ==
- Tchefuncte site, an archaeological site in the park
- Fairview-Riverside State Park
- List of Louisiana state parks
