= Lake Pontchartrain =

Estuary located in southeastern Louisiana, United States

- Lac Pontchartrain (French)
- Sentinel-2 image

- Location within Louisiana Location within the United States

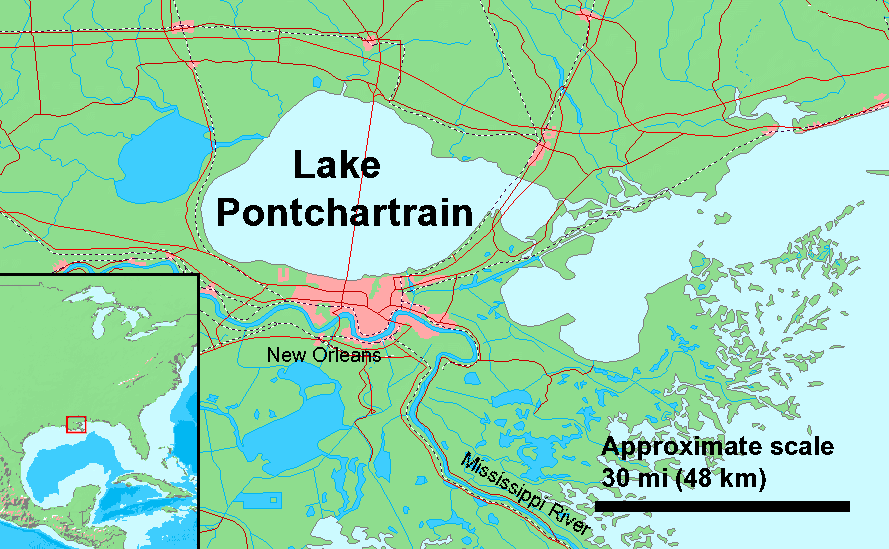
- Map
- Location: Louisiana
- Coordinates: 30°11′20″N 90°06′05″W
- Lake type: Estuary, saline
- Basin countries: United States
- Max. length: 40 mi (64 km)
- Max. width: 24 mi (39 km)
- Surface area: 630 mi^{2} (1,600 km^{2})
- Average depth: 12–14 ft (3.7–4.3 m)
- Max. depth: 65 ft (20 m)
- Surface elevation: 1 ft (0.30 m)

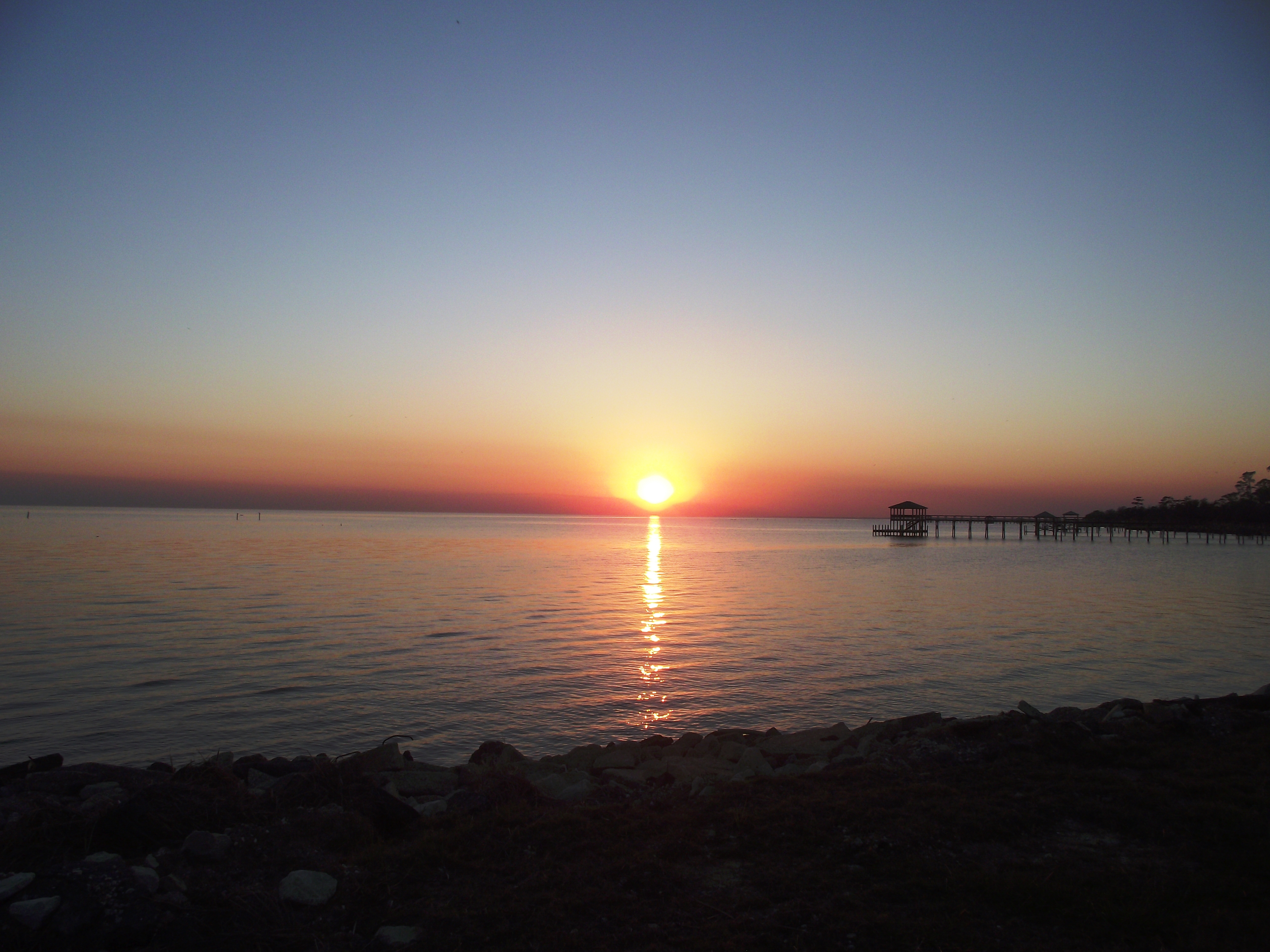
Lake Pontchartrain from southbound causeway entrance

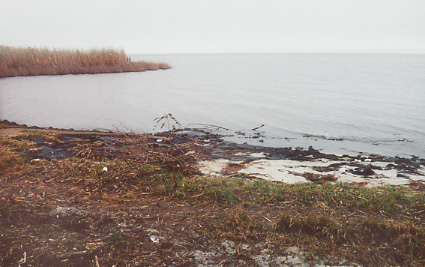
Lake Pontchartrain's north shore at Fontainebleau State Park near Mandeville, Louisiana, in 2004

Lake Pontchartrain (/ˈpɒntʃətreɪn/ PON-chə-trayn; French: Lac Pontchartrain, pronounced [lak pɔ̃ʃaʁtrɛ̃]) is an estuary in southeastern Louisiana in the United States. It covers 630 square miles (1,600 km^{2}) with an average depth of 12 to 14 feet (3.7 to 4.3 m). Some shipping channels are kept deeper through dredging. It is roughly oval, about 40 miles (64 km) from west to east and 24 miles (39 km) from south to north. As an estuary, its "Lake" title is a misnomer, but only a slight one, as its passage to the open sea is narrow.

The lake was named in 1699 by the French explorer Pierre Le Moyne d'Iberville for Louis Phélypeaux, comte de Pontchartrain, a minister under Louis XIV. It connects to the Gulf of Mexico through the Rigolets strait and Chef Menteur Pass by way of Lake Borgne, and receives fresh water from several rivers and bayous, giving it brackish water and only small tidal changes. Lake Pontchartrain is one of the largest wetland systems along the Gulf Coast of North America and forms the core of the wider Pontchartrain Basin, a watershed that spans 16 Louisiana parishes and four Mississippi counties.

The estuary is located in parts of six Louisiana parishes; in descending order of area, they are St. Tammany, Orleans, Jefferson, St. John the Baptist, St. Charles, and Tangipahoa. The water boundaries were defined in 1979 (see list of parishes in Louisiana).

The lake forms the northern boundary of New Orleans and its suburbs, and a portage between the lake and the Mississippi River was central to the city's founding in 1718. During hurricanes, a storm surge driven into the lake can overwhelm the levees protecting New Orleans, most catastrophically during Hurricane Katrina in 2005, when levee and floodwall failures along the lakefront flooded most of the city. Decades of oil and gas drilling, logging of cypress swamps, saltwater intrusion, and pollution have stressed the lake's ecosystems, prompting conservation and restoration efforts.

The estuary is crossed by the Lake Pontchartrain Causeway, the longest continuous bridge over water in the world. A power line also crosses the estuary; its towers stand on caissons.

== Toponymy ==
Lake Pontchartrain was named for Louis Phélypeaux, comte de Pontchartrain. He was the French Minister of the Marine, Chancellor, and Controller-General of Finances during the reign of France's "Sun King", Louis XIV, for whom the colony of Louisiane was named.

The name Pontchartrain itself comes from the place in France where Phélypeaux's château was situated. It is thought that this name originates from it being where a bridge (French: pont) crossed the river Mauldre on the ancient route from Lutèce to Chartres (chartrain).

== Description ==
Lake Pontchartrain is an estuary connected to the Gulf of Mexico via the Rigolets strait (known locally as "the Rigolets") and Chef Menteur Pass into Lake Borgne, another large lagoon, and therefore experiences small tidal changes. It receives fresh water from the Tangipahoa, Tchefuncte, Tickfaw, Amite, and Bogue Falaya rivers, and from Bayou Lacombe and Bayou Chinchuba. It is one of the largest wetlands along the Gulf Coast of North America. It comprises more than 125,000 acres (51,000 ha) of wetland, including bottomland hardwoods and cypress swamps (although these have been severely degraded by past logging), along with a complex mixture of herbaceous wetlands including fresh, intermediate, and brackish marsh. Lake Pontchartrain itself is part of the larger Pontchartrain Basin, a 10,000 mi^{2} (26,000 km^{2}) watershed that includes 16 Louisiana parishes and 4 Mississippi counties. The Basin is one of the largest estuarine systems of the Gulf of Mexico. The Pontchartrain Basin includes Lake Pontchartrain and the drainage area of its tributary streams, Lake Maurepas and the drainage area of its tributaries, The Rigolets, Lake Borgne, the Biloxi Marsh and Chandeleur Sound.

Salinity in Lake Pontchartrain varies from negligible at the northern cusp west of Mandeville up to nearly half the salinity of seawater at its eastern bulge near Interstate 10. The less saline Lake Maurepas connects with Lake Pontchartrain on the west via Pass Manchac. The Industrial Canal connects the Mississippi River with the lake at New Orleans. Bonnet Carré Spillway diverts water from the Mississippi into the lake during times of river flooding.

== History ==
The lake was formed 4,000 to 2,600 years ago as the evolving Mississippi River Delta formed its southern and eastern shorelines with alluvial deposits. Human habitation of the region began at least 3,500 years ago. One recorded Indigenous name for the lake is Okwata ('wide water').

Habitation increased rapidly with the arrival of Europeans; in 1699, French explorer Pierre Le Moyne d'Iberville renamed the Lake Pontchartrain after Louis Phélypeaux, comte de Pontchartrain.

In 1777, the American naturalist William Bartram explored the north shore during a trip west. In 1852, a railroad was constructed to link New Orleans to the north. Engines turned at Pass Manchac. However, the pilings were burned to the water line in the Civil War.

During the early 20th century, the great cypress swamps of the area were heavily logged and many have not regrown.

After over 30 years of oil drilling had yielded just 12 million barrels of oil and condensate and 119 billion cubic feet of natural gas, and caused major pollution of the lake, the State Mineral Board enacted a moratorium on oil drilling. As of 2009, there were 4 active wells continuing prior leases, and 25 derelict wells. According to the Louisiana Department of Environmental Quality (LDEQ), they and the US Coast Guard see at least one oil spill per day in Louisiana's wetlands. Estuarine wetlands are among the highest on the Environmental sensitivity Index (ESI).

== Conservation and restoration ==
Oil drilling and other exploitation stresses the lake's ecosystems. Marshes, for example, are turning to open water, and cypress swamps are being killed by saltwater intrusion. However, brown pelicans and bald eagles, once scarce, were a common sight along the shores as of 2004. A team of experts assembled by The Nature Conservancy assessed the situation in 2004 and identified seven target habitat types in particular need of conservation management: bottomland hardwood forest, cypress swamp, relict ridge woodland, fresh/intermediate marsh, brackish/salt marsh, lake open water, and littoral submersed aquatic vegetation. The bottomland hardwood forest and cypress swamp are suffering from a lack of freshwater input and sediment deposition owing to the levees upstream from the lake. In addition, bottomland hardwoods are being invaded by exotic species such as Chinese tallow, while freshwater marshes are being invaded by exotic species such as elephant's-ear. The team identified four key animal species which could indicate the degree to which the system declines or improves. These were the rangia clam (representing lake bottom habitat), gulf sturgeon and paddlefish (representing fish communities), and the alligator snapping turtle (one of the largest freshwater turtles in the world, but in decline owing to over-harvesting).

The future of the lake depends, in part, on restoring annual spring floods to the wetlands of the lake basin and controlling urban sprawl on the north shore. Selected species, like the paddlefish and alligator snapping turtle, would benefit from reduced harvesting. The lake could change considerably without such conservation planning. As of 2007, a few examples of future change included more cypress swamps converting to anthropogenic marsh or open water, Chinese tallow displacing native forests, and, with a warming climate, mangrove trees replacing brackish marsh. Hence, the ecosystems of the lake now, and in the future, depend very much upon some basic decisions about human activities in the vicinity of the lake, and, even more so, human activity upstream along the Mississippi River.

The Lake Pontchartrain Basin includes the Greater New Orleans area, which had a population of about 1.5 million people..

There have been many problems with the conservation management of forests and wetlands. As of 1995, the United States Geological Survey was monitoring the environmental effects of shoreline erosion, loss of wetlands, pollution from urban areas and agriculture, saltwater intrusion from artificial waterways, dredging, basin subsidence and faulting, storms and sea level rise, and freshwater diversion from the Mississippi and other rivers. With proper management of this lake and its wetlands, there is potential to increase the productivity of wetlands, and to maintain biological diversity to support an ecotourism industry that will diversify the economy.

== Northshore ==
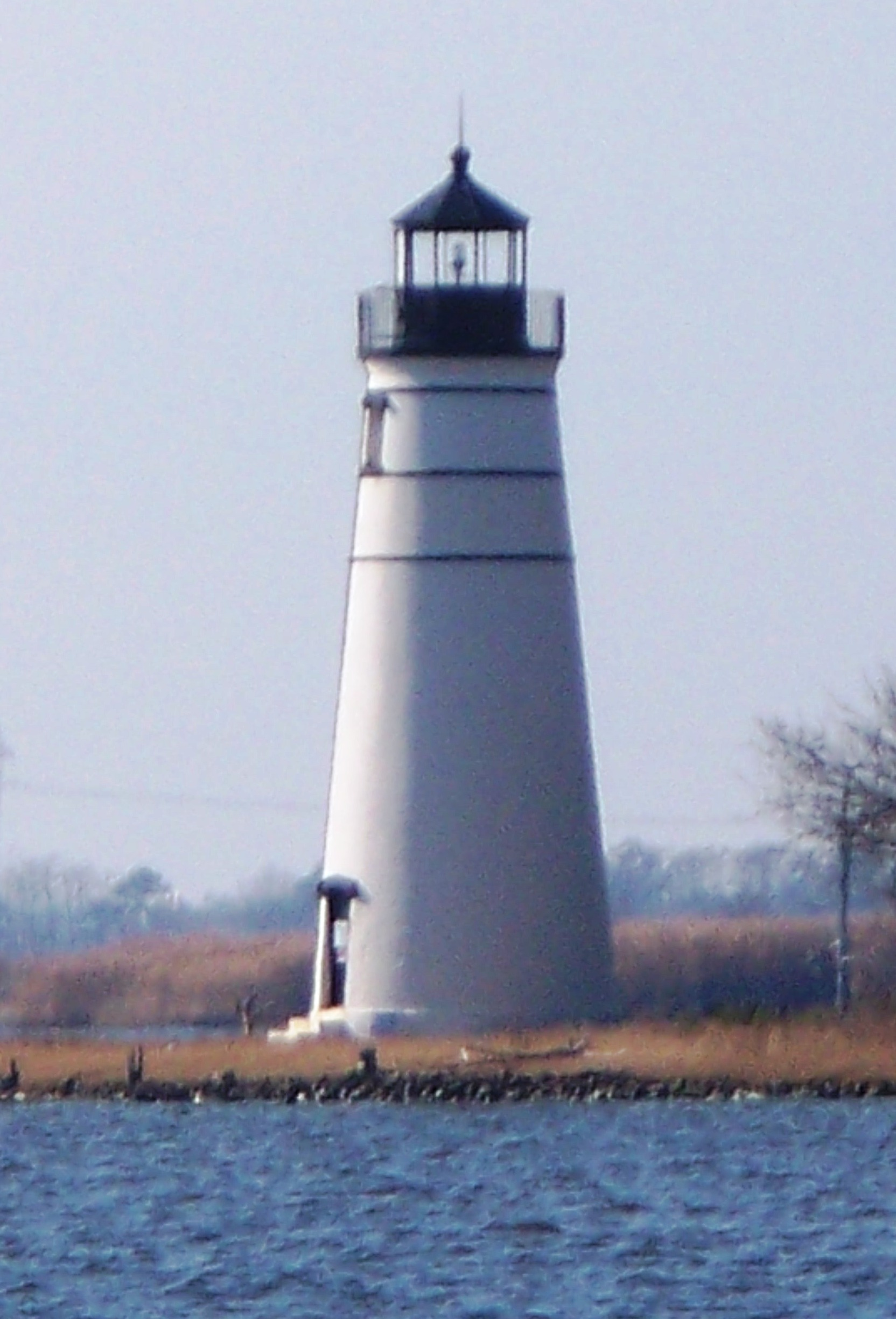
At the southern terminus of LA 1077 in Madisonville, this lighthouse is on the west estuary of the Tchefuncte River at Lake Pontchartrain and was constructed in 1837.

The area north of Lake Pontchartrain is known as the North Shore or the Northshore. It includes the cities of Mandeville, Covington, Abita Springs, Madisonville, Pearl River, Lacombe, and Slidell in St. Tammany Parish; Ponchatoula, Hammond, Amite, and Kentwood in Tangipahoa Parish; and Bogalusa and Franklinton in Washington Parish.

These three Northshore parishes are the eastern Florida Parishes. The landscape here is mostly uplands that were once dominated by long leaf pine savannas and interrupted by occasional large rivers. The savannas were maintained by regular fires caused by lightning; they produced the distinctive fauna and flora of this region.

Lake Pontchartrain forms the northern boundary of the city of New Orleans, which is coterminous with Orleans Parish, and the northern boundary of its two largest suburbs, Metairie and Kenner; as well as forming the northern boundaries of Jefferson Parish and Saint Charles Parish, and much of the northern and eastern boundaries of Saint John the Baptist Parish. These regions are often referred to as the South Shore, or Southshore.

== New Orleans ==
New Orleans was established at a Native American portage between the Mississippi River and Lake Pontchartrain. The lake provides numerous recreational activities for people in New Orleans and is also home to the Southern Yacht Club. In the 1920s, the Industrial Canal in the eastern part of the city opened, providing a direct navigable water connection, with locks, between the Mississippi River and the lake. In the same decade, a project dredging new land from the lake shore behind a new concrete floodwall began; this would result in an expansion of the city into the former swamp between Metairie/Gentilly Ridges and the lakefront. The Lake Pontchartrain Causeway was constructed in the 1950s and 1960s, connecting New Orleans (by way of Metairie) with Mandeville, and bisecting the lake in a north-northeast line.

== Hurricanes ==
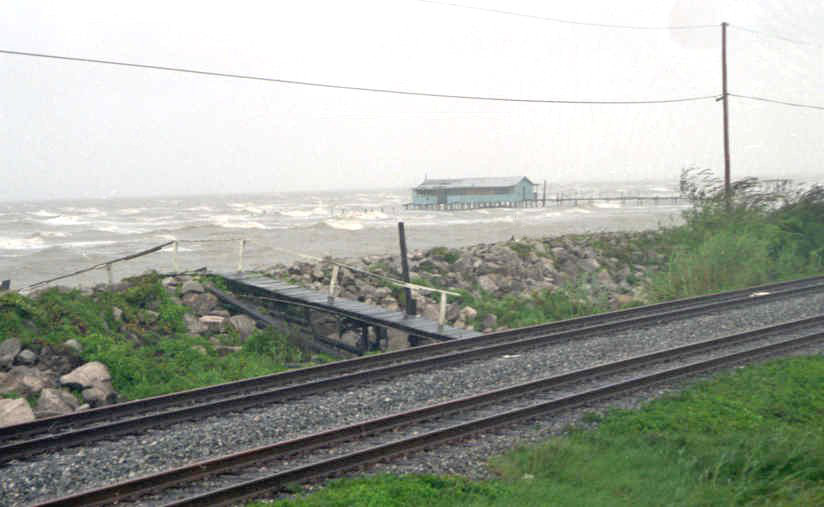
Lake Pontchartrain at New Orleans during Hurricane Georges in 1998; lakefront fishing camps outside of the protection levee suffered severe damage.

During hurricanes, a storm surge can build up in Lake Pontchartrain. Wind pushes water into the lake from the Gulf of Mexico as a hurricane approaches from the south, and from there it can spill into New Orleans.

A hurricane in 1947 flooded much of Metairie, much of which is slightly below sea level due to land subsidence after marshland was drained. After the storm, hurricane-protection levees were built along Lake Pontchartrain's south shore to protect New Orleans and nearby communities. A storm surge of 10 feet (3.0 m) from Hurricane Betsy overwhelmed some levees in eastern New Orleans in 1965, while a storm surge funneled in by the Mississippi River–Gulf Outlet Canal and a levee failure flooded most of the Lower 9th Ward. After this the levees encircling the city and outlying parishes were raised to heights of 14 to 23 feet (4.3 to 7.0 m). Due to cost concerns, the levees were built to protect against only a Category 3 hurricane; however, some of the levees initially withstood the Category 5 storm surge of Hurricane Katrina (August 2005), which only slowed to Category 3 winds within hours of landfall (due to a last-minute eyewall replacement cycle).

Experts using computer modeling at Louisiana State University after Hurricane Katrina have concluded that the levees were never topped but rather faulty design, inadequate construction, or some combination of the two were responsible for the flooding of most of New Orleans. Some canal walls leaked underneath because the wall foundations were not deep enough in peat-subsoil to withstand the pressure of higher water.

=== Funding ===
Congress failed to fully fund an upgrade requested during the 1990s by the Army Corps of Engineers, and funding was cut in 2003–04 despite a 2001 study by the Federal Emergency Management Agency warning that a hurricane in New Orleans was one of the country's three most likely disasters. Raising and reinforcing the levees to resist a Category 5 hurricane might take 25 years to complete. Some estimates place the cost at $25 billion.

=== Hurricane Katrina ===
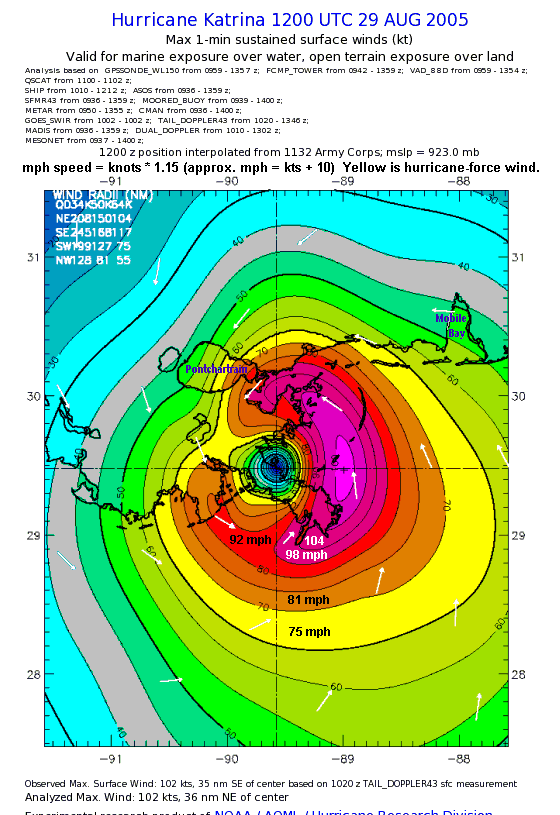
Windspeed of Hurricane Katrina at 7 a.m., showing hurricane-force winds (yellow/brown/red: 75–92 mph; 121–148 km/h) hitting the northeast–south shores of Lake Pontchartrain (1 hour after landfall) on August 29, 2005

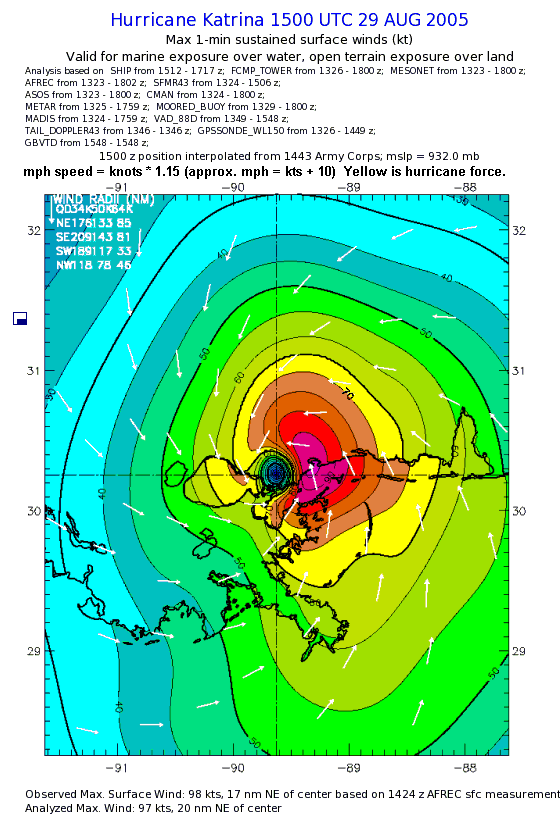
Windspeed of Hurricane Katrina at 10 a.m., showing hurricane-force winds (yellow/brown) still hitting the north–southeast shores of Lake Pontchartrain (4 hours after landfall)

When Hurricane Katrina reached Category 5 in 2005, some experts predicted that the levee system might fail completely if the storm passed close to the city. Although Katrina weakened to a Category 3 before making landfall on August 29 (with only Category 1-2 strength winds in New Orleans on the weaker side of the eye of the hurricane), the outlying New Orleans East area along south Lake Pontchartrain was in the eyewall with winds, preceding the eye, nearly as strong as those experienced in Bay St. Louis, Mississippi. Canals near Chalmette began leaking at 8 am, and some levees/canals, designed to withstand Category 3 storms, suffered multiple breaks the following day (see Effects of Hurricane Katrina in New Orleans), flooding 80% of the city.

The walls of the Industrial Canal were breached by storm surge via the Mississippi River Gulf Outlet, while the 17th Street Canal and London Avenue Canal experienced catastrophic breaches, even though water levels never topped their flood walls. Louisiana State University experts presented evidence that some of these structures might have had design flaws or faulty construction.

There are indications that the soft earth and peat underlying canal walls may have given way. In the weeks before Katrina, tests of salinity in seepage pools near canals showed them to be lake water, not fresh water from broken mains. The 5.5-mile-long (8.9 km) I-10 Twin Span Bridge heading northeast between New Orleans and Slidell was destroyed. The shorter Fort Pike Bridge crossing the outlet to Lake Borgne remained intact.

Much of the northern sector of the suburban areas of Metairie and Kenner was flooded with up to 2 to 3 feet (0.6 to 0.9 m) of water. In this area, flooding was not the result of levee overtopping but was due to a decision by the governmental administration of Jefferson Parish to abandon the levee-aligned drainage pumping stations. This resulted in the reverse flow of lake water through the pumping stations into drainage canals which subsequently overflowed, causing extensive flooding of the area between I-10 and the lakefront. When the pump operators were returned to their stations, water was drained out of Metairie and Kenner in less than a day.

On September 5, 2005, the Army Corps of Engineers started to fix levee breaches by dropping huge sandbags from Chinook helicopters. The London Avenue Canal and Industrial Canal were blocked at the lake as permanent repairs started. On September 6, the Corps began pumping flood water back into the lake after seven days in the streets of New Orleans. Because it was fouled with dead animals, sewage, heavy metals, petrochemicals, and other dangerous substances, the Army Corps worked with the U.S. Environmental Protection Agency and Louisiana Department of Environmental Quality (LDEQ) to avoid major contamination and eutrophication of the lake.

Aerial photography suggests that 25 billion US gallons (95,000,000 m^{3}) of water covered New Orleans as of September 2, which equals about 2% of Lake Pontchartrain's volume. Due to a lack of electric power, the city was unable to treat the water before pumping it into the lake. It is unclear how long the pollution will persist and what its environmental damage to the lake will be, or what the long-term health effects will be in the city from mold and other contamination.

On September 24, 2005, Hurricane Rita did not breach the temporary repairs in the main part of the city, but the repair on the Industrial Canal wall in the Lower 9th Ward was breached, allowing about 2 feet (0.6 m) of water back into that neighborhood.

== Popular Culture ==
Lake Pontchartrain is mentioned in the hit single Heart of the Night by the country-rock group Poco, as well by country singer George Strait in his song Adalida.

== Notable deaths ==
- Eastern Air Lines Flight 304 crashed into the lake on February 25, 1964, resulting in the deaths of 51 passengers and 7 crew.
- On June 16, 1964, a Trailways bus plunged off the Lake Pontchartrain Causeway into Lake Pontchartrain, killing 6.
- On December 31, 1967, a chartered plane crashed into Lake Pontchartrain, killing 5 servicemen and the pilot.
- On September 15, 1978, six-year-old Benjamin Daly, along with the pilot, died when a private plane his parents had chartered crashed into the lake. His parents survived.
- On February 23, 1980, a twin-engine plane crashed into Lake Pontchartrain, killing 7.
- On January 15, 1981, a Piper PA-23 flying in heavy fog crashed into Lake Pontchartrain while on final approach to New Orleans Lakefront Airport, killing the plane's owner and pilot Joyce W. Hornady, the 73-year-old CEO of Hornady Manufacturing Company, and two other company employees Edward A. Heers, a 34-year-old engineer, and James W. Garber, a 29-year-old customer service manager. All three men were due to attend and represent their company in the 1981 SHOT Show in New Orleans.
- In 1986, a decomposing woman's body was found by two fishermen. The cause of death was homicide by asphyxia. She was not identified and no leads were ever identified in the case. In October 2024, the woman was identified as Pamela Lee Hupp, who was missing out of Fort Lauderdale, FL. Her murder case remains open.
- New England Patriots defensive end, New Orleans native, and former LSU star Marquise Hill was found dead in Lake Pontchartrain on May 28, 2007.
- A U.S. Navy T-34 training plane crashed into the lake on January 23, 2010, after a routine training mission. The instructor, LT Clinton Wermers, was found dead at 0100 on January 27, 2010. The student pilot was rescued about two hours after the crash.
- On August 27, 2016, a single engine Cessna 172R crashed into the lake during a sightseeing tour. Pilot James Biondo and passenger Reginald Hilliard lost their lives in the accident. Their bodies were discovered in the plane’s wreckage. Hilliard’s girlfriend, Briana Davis, survived the crash and was rescued by a nearby boater.
- A single engine Cessna 172N crashed into Lake Pontchartrain out of Gulfport, MS on November 24, 2025. The plane was carrying 30 year-old flight instructor Taylor Dickey and also 30 year-old U.S. Navy Lieutenant and student David Michael Jahn. The plane was located without the occupants inside of it. Both persons are presumed to be dead.

== See also ==
- Lake Pontchartrain Causeway
- Bonnet Carré Spillway
- Tammany Trace Rail Trail
- Louisiana's 1st congressional district
- List of lakes of the United States
- "The Lakes of Pontchartrain"
- Lombard Plantation
