= Fairview-Riverside State Park =

State park in Louisiana, United States

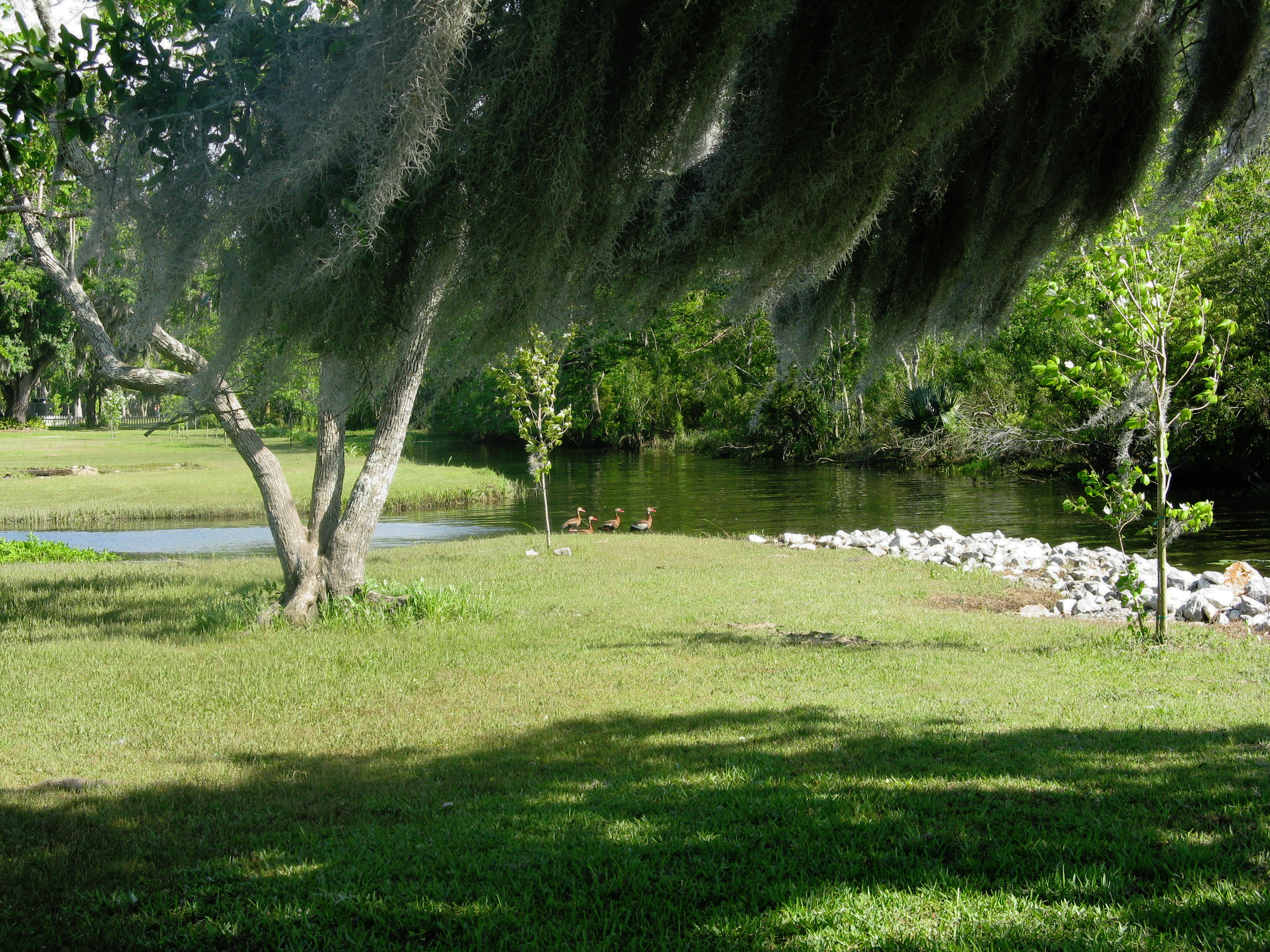
- Black-Bellied Whistling Ducks at Fairview-Riverside State Park

- Location within Louisiana
- Location: St. Tammany Parish, Louisiana, United States
- Coordinates: 30.408796°N 90.1404616°W
- Area: 98 acres (0.40 km^{2}; 0.153 sq mi)
- Visitors: 51,929 (in 2022)
- Governing body: Louisiana Office of State Parks
- Website: Official website

Fairview-Riverside State Park is a tourist attraction 2 miles (3.2 km) east of Madisonville, Louisiana, United States. Its 99 acres (400,000 m^{2}) are set along the banks of the Tchefuncte River. Within the park is the Otis House Museum, built in 1885, which was placed on the National Register of Historic Places in 1999. Visitors go to Fairview-Riverside to camp and for water sports and fishing. The park has 100 campsites, a short nature trail, and a boardwalk that reveals forested wetlands along the Tchefuncte River.

The park was featured in the eighth season of The Amazing Race.

== Otis House ==
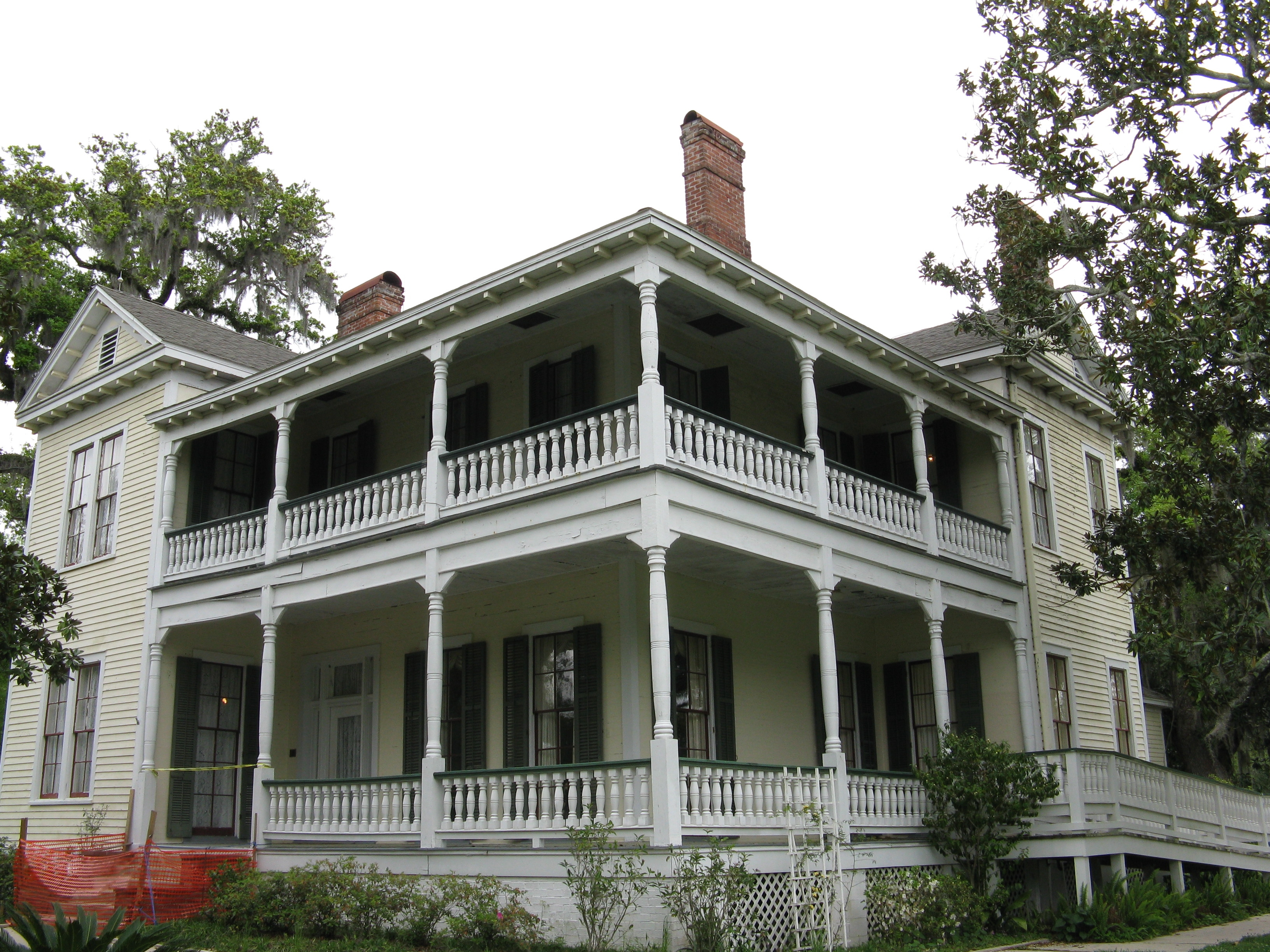
The Frank Otis House

Situated on Fairview-Riverside State Park, the Frank Otis House was built in 1885 by William Theodore Jay, who owned a sawmill near the property. In 1906, Jay sold the property and the sawmill to the Houlton brothers, Charles and William. The area became known as Houltonville, and included the Johnson and Houlton Store, a U.S. post office, and about 250 sawmill workers.

Frank Otis, whose family owned Otis Manufacturing in New Orleans, purchased the property from the Houltons in 1936 and used the residence as a summer home until his death in 1962. He bequeathed the house and 99 acres to the state of Louisiana, requesting it be used for public recreation. The house was placed on the National Register of Historic Places in 1999.

The house closed for renovations in late 2010 and reopened in October 2011. The renovations included a lead abatement treatment, structural repairs of storm damage, and painting the exterior in the original color, which was determined by a professional paint analysis. The house was used for the 1981 horror film The Beyond and the 1997 film Eve's Bayou.

== See also ==
- Fontainebleau State Park
- List of Louisiana state parks
