= Sliver by the River =

The Sliver by the River is a nickname for the area of New Orleans, Louisiana, closest to the Mississippi River, which escaped major flooding after Hurricane Katrina hit the city on August 29, 2005. It exists on higher ground, the natural levee built up by centuries of flooding before there was human settlement. It generally corresponds to the mid-19th-century Crescent City nickname for the city.

After people returned to New Orleans following Hurricane Katrina, many settled in this area. In this area are many businesses and historic homes which survived the hurricane. This area also saw more redevelopment following the hurricane, while other (usually poorer) areas saw little investment.

The Sliver by the River included parts or all of the Bywater, Faubourg Marigny, French Quarter, Warehouse District, Garden District, Uptown, and Carrollton neighborhoods of New Orleans.
