= Bayou Segnette State Park =

State park in Louisiana, United States

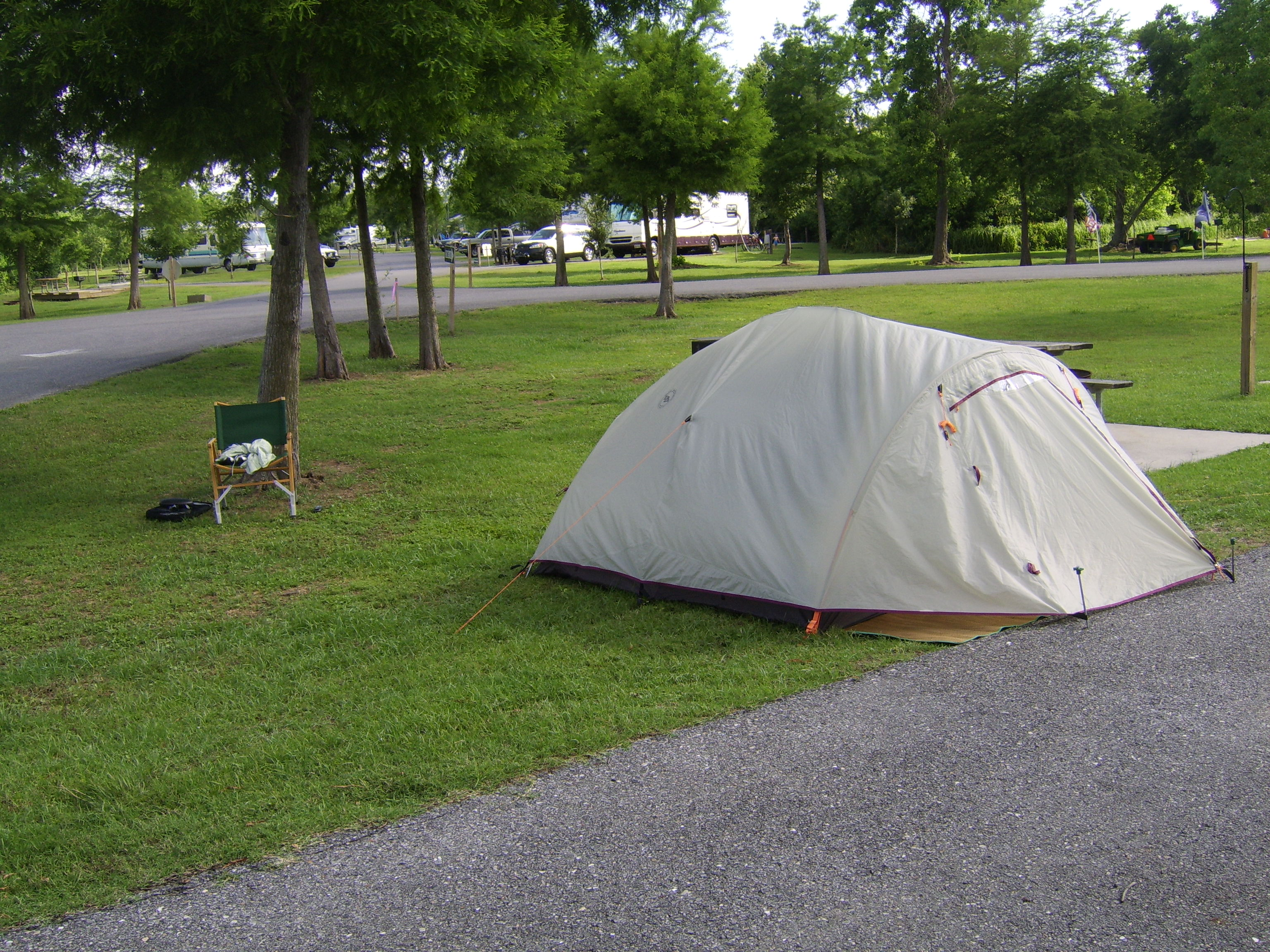
- Picnic area at Bayou Segnette State Park

- Location within Louisiana
- Location: Jefferson Parish, Louisiana, United States of America
- Coordinates: 29°54.1801′N 90°9.2672′W
- Area: 676 acres (2.74 km^{2}; 1.056 sq mi)
- Visitors: 90,771 (in 2022)
- Governing body: Louisiana Office of State Parks
- Website: Official website

Bayou Segnette State Park is located in Westwego, Jefferson Parish, southwest of New Orleans, Louisiana, on the west bank of the Mississippi River.

Bayou Segnette is not far from the urban center of New Orleans, yet it features access to two types of wetlands, swamp and marsh. Saltwater intrusion coming into the canals from the Gulf of Mexico created the marsh. This is a remarkable habitat for plant and wildlife. This habitat is home to American alligators, coypu, nine-banded armadillos, Virginia opossum, raccoons, American mink, red-tailed hawks, kites, red-winged blackbirds, bald eagles, and northern cardinals.

== Features ==
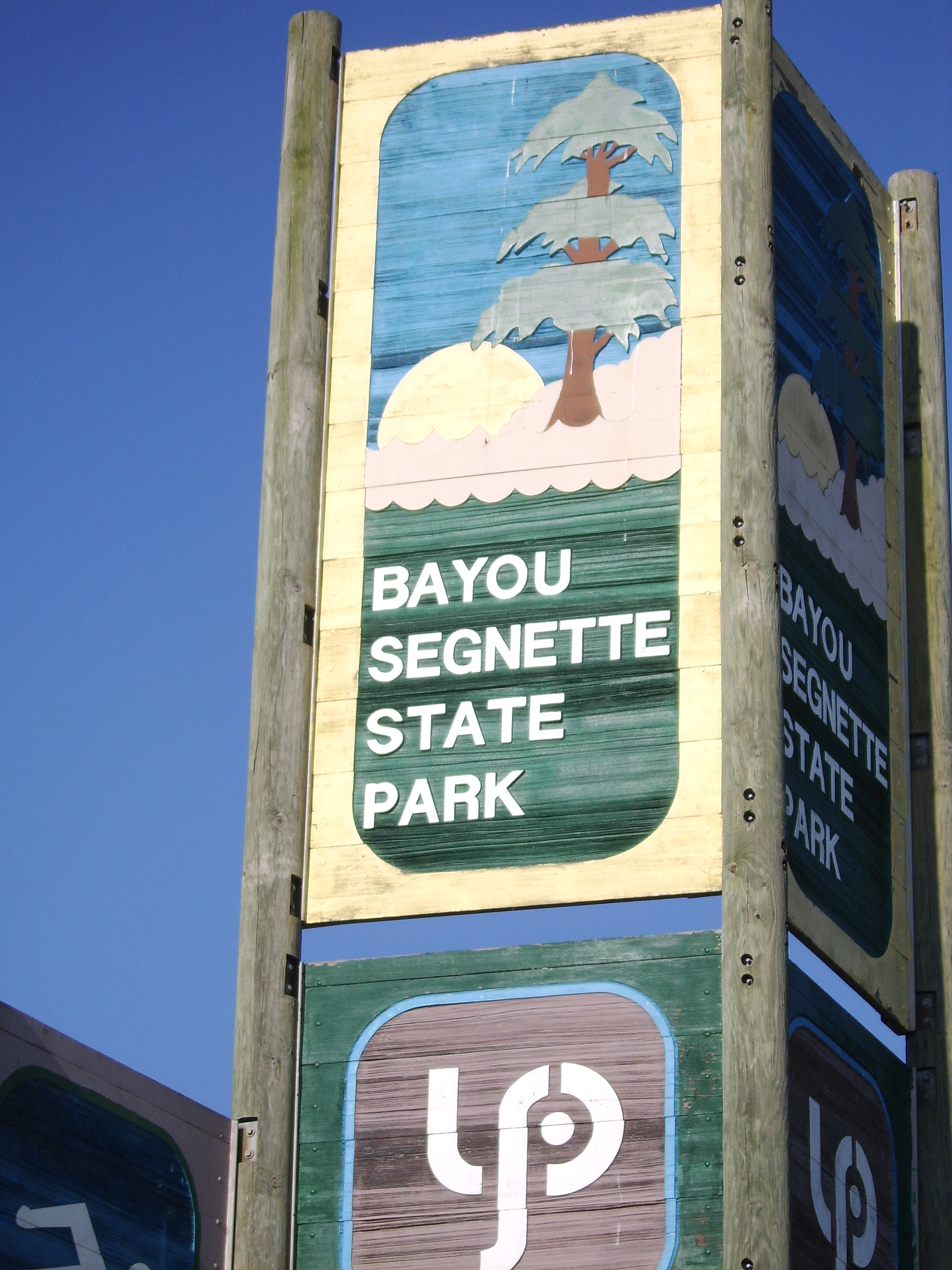
The entrance sign to Bayou Segnette State Park

- Alario Center
- Bayou Segnette Field
- Boat launch with access to the marshlands and waterways of the Bayou
- 16 vacation cabins with air conditioning, heating, and fishing piers
- Camping for RVs and tents – There are 98 sites with water and electricity.
- Comfort stations with showers and laundry
- RV dump station
- Group camp with kitchen and dormitories for up to 120 people
- Meeting room which accommodates 60 to 100 people
- Wave pool in the day use area and swimming pool in the campground area
- 1 mile (1.6 km) nature trail

== See also ==
- Grand Isle State Park
- List of Louisiana state parks
