= Louisiana State Arboretum =

Protected area in Louisiana, United States

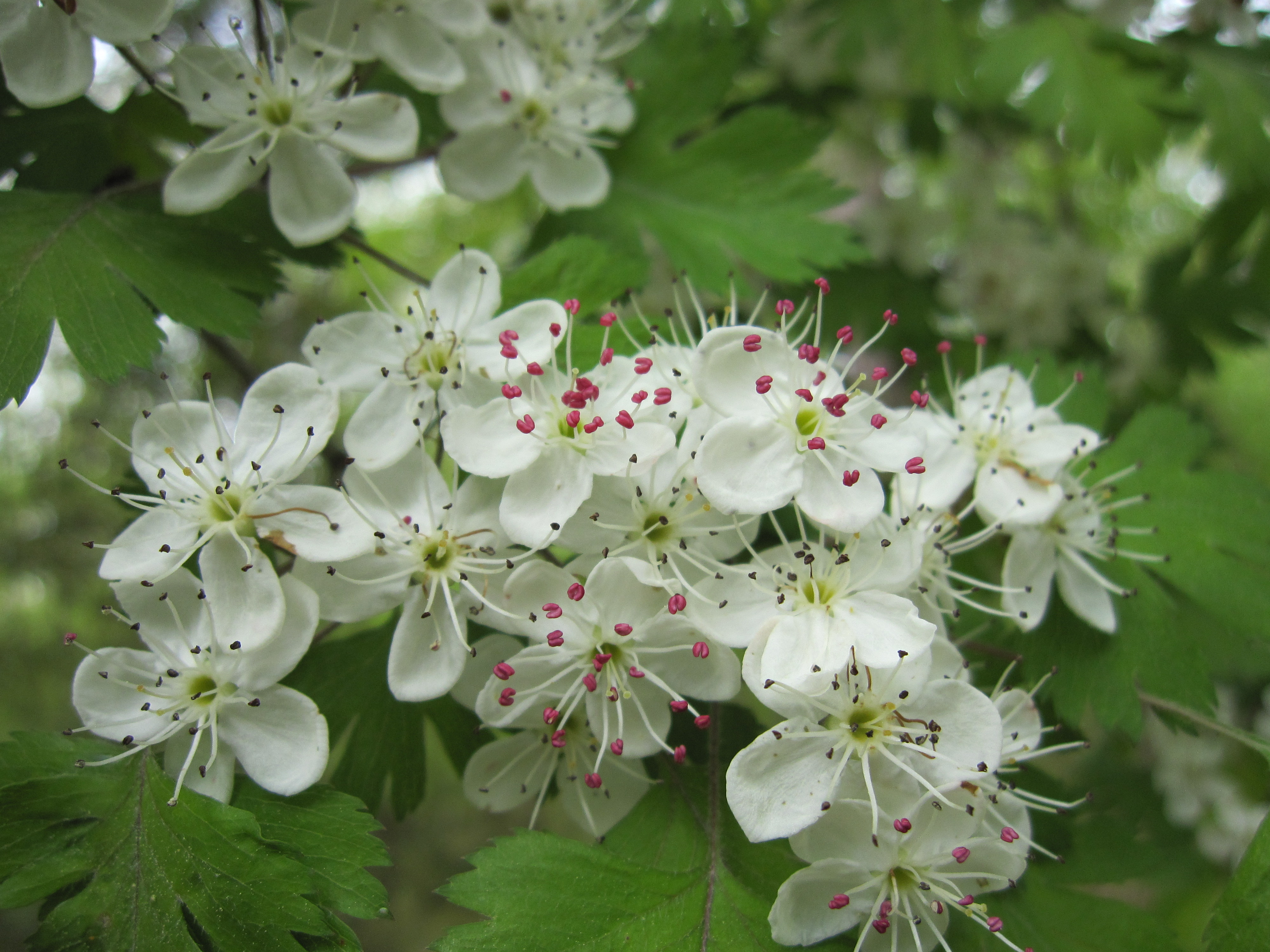

- Location within Louisiana
- Location: Evangeline Parish, Louisiana, United States of America
- Coordinates: 30°48′14″N 92°17′17″W
- Area: 600 acres (2.4 km^{2}; 0.94 sq mi)
- Established: 1961
- Governing body: Louisiana Office of State Parks
- Website: Official website

The Louisiana State Arboretum 600 acres (240 ha), is an arboretum located on Louisiana Highway 3042, approximately 13 km (eight miles) north of Ville Platte, Louisiana inside of Chicot State Park, United States, and bordering a branch of Lake Chicot. Established in 1961, it is the oldest state-supported arboretum in the United States.

== History ==
Initial efforts to establish a Louisiana Arboretum in the 1950s were led by Caroline Dormon, A. G. Lawton, and J. D. Lafleur Sr. The majority of these efforts were near Ville Platte and included Magnolia Garden Club, the Rotary Club, and the Chamber of Commerce. In spring of 1961, the State Parks and Recreation Commission ordered the creation of the Louisiana State Arboretum.

== Description ==
The Arboretum contains over 150 species of plant life native to Louisiana, on a varied topography suitable for nearly all Louisiana vegetation except those of the prairies and coastal marshes. The Arboretum is a mature Beech-Magnolia forest containing centuries-old giant beech, magnolia, oak, and ash trees, as well as ferns, hickories, maples, sycamores, and crane fly orchids. Wildlife includes white-tail deer, fox, opossum, raccoon, skunk, squirrel, wild turkey, and numerous other bird species.

== See also ==
- List of botanical gardens in the United States
- Chicot State Park
