= Joe Brant =

American serial killer

- 2013 mugshot
- Born: July 13, 1969 (age 57)
- Convictions: First degree murder (3 counts); Second degree murder
- Penalty: Life imprisonment

Details
- Victims: 4+
- Span of crimes: 2007–2008
- Country: United States
- State: Louisiana

Joseph Brant (born July 13, 1969) is an American serial killer and rapist who killed at least four women in New Orleans between October 2007 to September 2008 in the then-post-Hurricane Katrina environment.

Brant was in prison on burglary charges when the other cases finally caught up to him. He eventually confessed and pleaded guilty to the other three murders and received three additional life sentences.

== New Orleans murders ==
On January 11, 2008, Jody Johnson, a former cheerleader from Georgia struggling with a painkiller addiction, was walking in the 7th Ward when she went missing. Her body was found the next day with a gunshot wound to the forehead, and it was clear that it had been set on fire. Then, on August 11, 2008, the body of Jessica Hawk, a 32-year-old botanist, was found inside her home on Chartres Street in Bywater, New Orleans.

On the night of September 27, 2008, Kirsten Brydum, a San Francisco community activist who was visiting New Orleans, left a party to go home. Later the next day, police found Brydum's body on the side of the road. She had a gunshot wound to the head, and her purse and wallet were stolen. Because of that, police initially believed her death occurred during a robbery in which the perpetrator engaged in a struggle.

== Confessions ==
In 2013, Joseph Brant, a 44-year-old convict serving time for burglary in a Texas prison, was linked and soon confessed to the Hawk murder. Three years later, he pleaded guilty to charges of second-degree murder, and a judge sentenced him to life imprisonment. In early February 2018, Brant informed his attorneys that he wanted to provide information on other unsolved killings in New Orleans. He soon confessed to the murders of the other two New Orleans women and a fourth murder.

The fourth victim was an unidentified woman found in a burned-out car in 2007. Brant told investigators that on October 17, 2007, he solicited sex with the unnamed woman, but when she refused, he pulled a knife on her and forced her into the car, then strangled her to death while trying to rape her. He then placed the woman's body inside a stolen car abandoned by the train tracks, doused her with gasoline, and set her on fire, possibly destroying any possible ways for identification in the future.

In 2021, Brandt pleaded guilty to three counts of first degree murder in the deaths of the unnamed sex worker, Jody Johnson, and Kirsten Brydum. In exchange, he was spared a possible death sentence and instead received three life terms without parole.

== See also ==
- List of serial killers in the United States
