= Grand Isle State Park (Louisiana) =

State park in Louisiana, United States

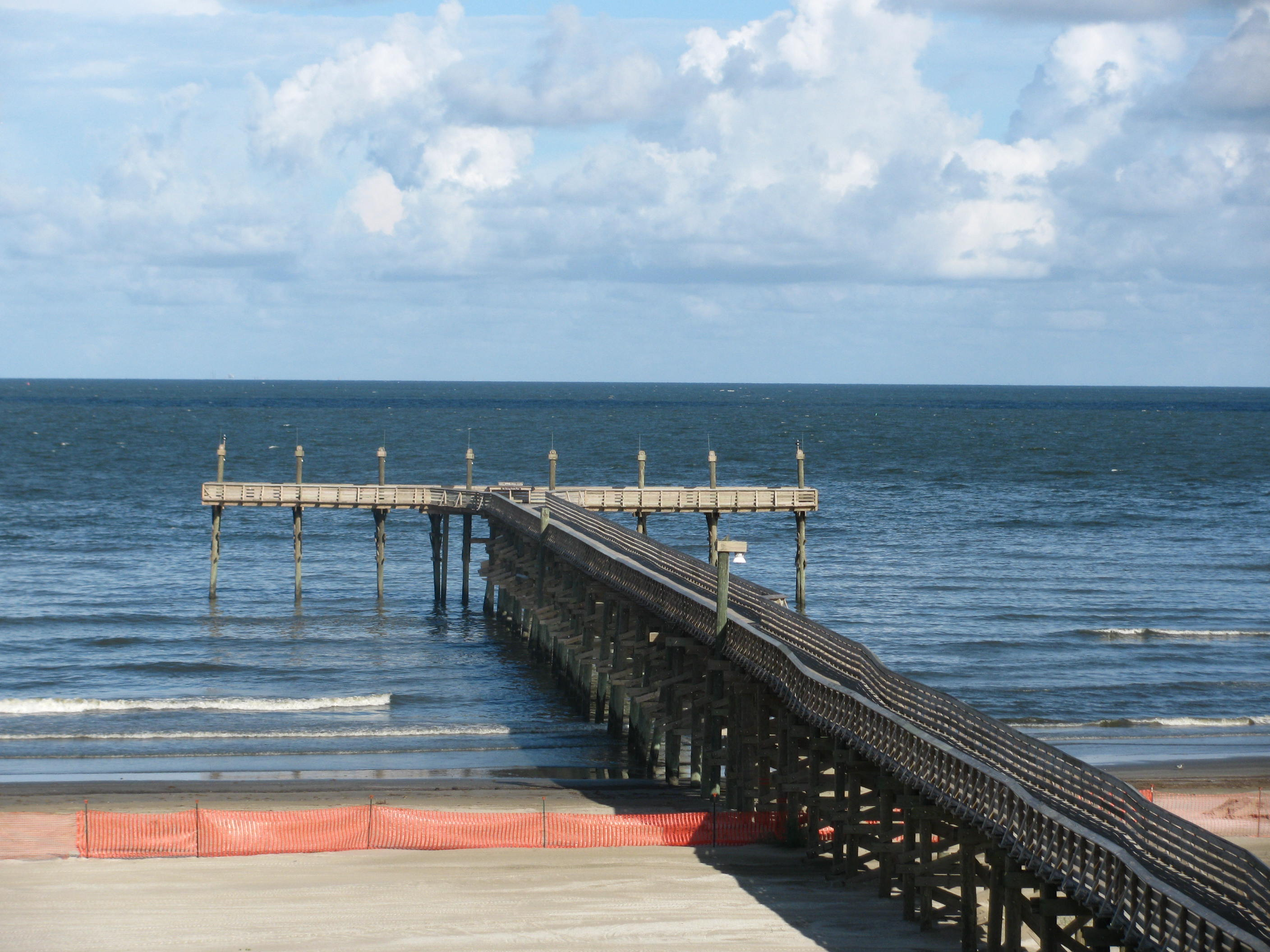
- A view of the Gulf of Mexico at Grand Isle State Park

- Location within Louisiana
- Location: Jefferson Parish, Louisiana, United States
- Coordinates: 29.25861°N 89.95472°W
- Area: 140 acres (0.57 km^{2}; 0.22 sq mi)
- Established: 1968
- Visitors: 16,835 (in 2022)
- Governing body: Louisiana Office of State Parks
- Website: Official website

Grand Isle State Park, lies at the eastern tip of Grand Isle, a barrier island in Jefferson Parish, Louisiana, U.S.A. Grand Isle is the only inhabited barrier island in the state.

The park has been seriously affected in the past by Hurricanes Katrina, Gustav, and Ike. However, much of Grand Isle State Park has been renovated. Beach restoration in the area is ongoing.

The area has a long-standing reputation as one of America's best fishing spots with access to over 300 species of fish. At one time, the park's fishing pier was especially popular, but it was destroyed in 2005 by Hurricane Katrina and had to be repaired. An observation tower provides fine views of the surrounding coastal scenery. Visitors come to 160-acre (0.65 km^{2}) Grand Isle State Park to beachcomb, birdwatch, boat, camp, crab, fish, and sunbathe.

The site is rumored to hold the buried treasure of famed 18th century privateers Jean and Pierre Lafitte whose operations were based at the neighboring Grand Terre Island across the Barataria Pass. The legend of the rougarou also is told as part of the area's history.

On May 22, 2010, the beach was closed due to oil contamination from the Deepwater Horizon oil spill. On May 3, 2011, a portion of the beach reopened. On June 26, 2011, volunteers, organized by the Coalition to Restore Coastal Louisiana, planted 1,600 black mangrove trees along the coast to prevent erosion.

It was named in 2020 to The New York Times' List of 52 Places to Go which noted that the site "may soon vanish" and faces one of the world’s highest rates of relative sea level rise.

== See also ==
- Grand Isle, Louisiana, town which shares the island with the state park
- Bayou Segnette State Park
- List of Louisiana state parks
