= Chicot State Park =

State park in Louisiana, United States

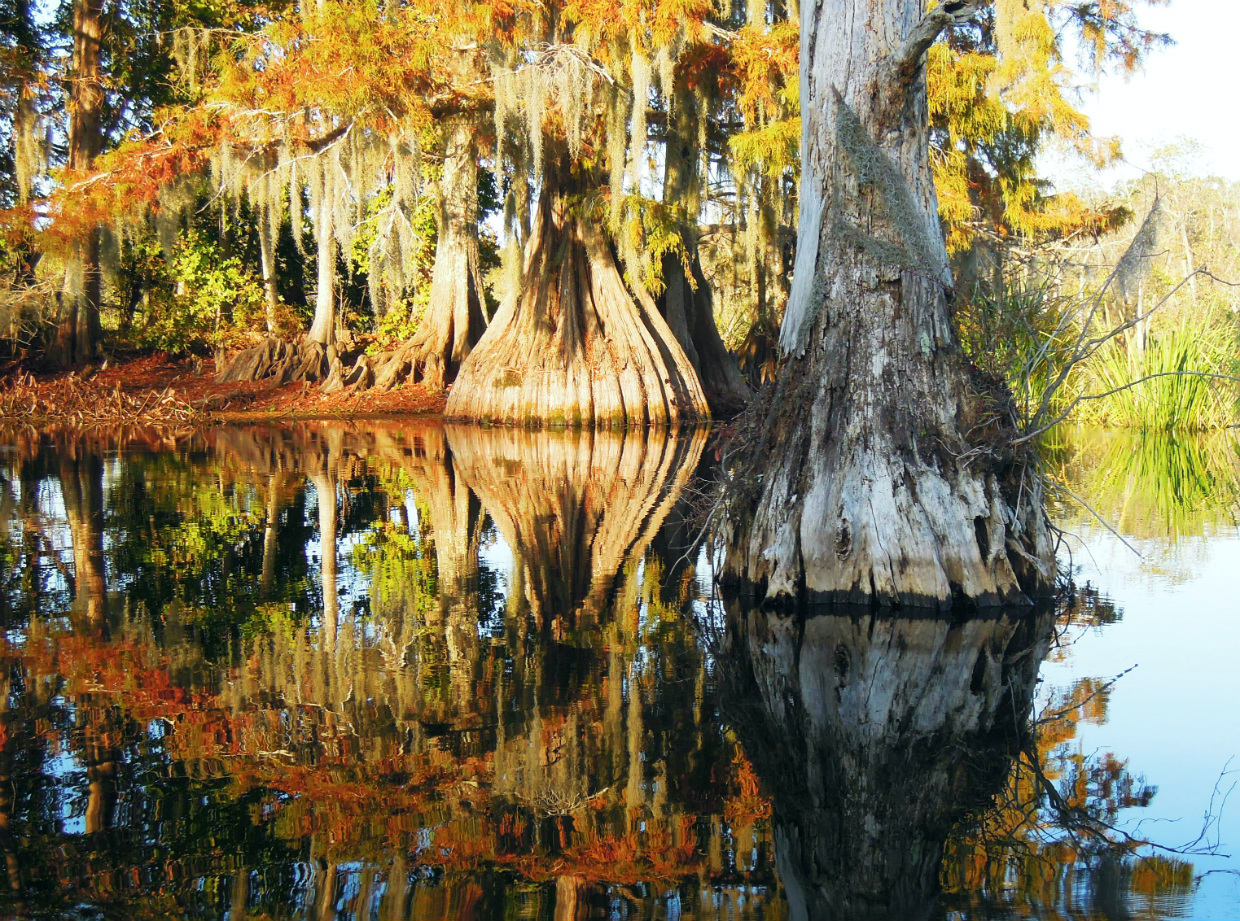
- Lake Chicot

- Location within Louisiana
- Location: Evangeline Parish, Louisiana, United States of America
- Coordinates: 30.80028°N 92.27972°W
- Area: over 6,400 acres (26 km^{2}; 10.0 sq mi)
- Established: 1939
- Visitors: 108,209 (in 2022)
- Governing body: Louisiana Office of State Parks
- Website: Official website

Chicot State Park is located near Ville Platte, Louisiana. This wildlife reserve of South Central Louisiana features 6,400 acres (26 km^{2}) of rolling hills surrounding a 2,000-acre (8 km^{2}) man-made Lake Chicot stocked with bass, crappie (sac-au-lait), bluegill, and red-ear sunfish. Chicot Park offers fishing boat rentals, pavilions, barbecue pits, picnic areas, restrooms, primitive hike-to campsites, lodges, and furnished cabins. The park is home to a number of wild animal species, including whitetail deer, raccoons, coyotes, and bobcats.

== History ==
One of the older Louisiana parks, the park was added to the Louisiana State Park system in 1939. Under the direction of the National Park Service, the Civilian Conservation Corps significantly developed the area.

== Activities ==
Fishing is encouraged at the park with a boathouse, three boat launches, and boat rental facilities. The waters of Lake Chicot are habitat to largemouth bass, crappie, bluegill, and red-ear sunfish.

A hiking/backpacking trail encircles the lake and supports several primitive campsites. The trail is tailored for mountain bikes and cycling is encouraged throughout the park. The park includes a 22-mile (35 km) hiking trail.

The South Landing offers cabins, campsites, a group camp, lodge, picnic areas, playgrounds, splash pad and the Louisiana State Arboretum State Preservation Area. The North Landing features lodges, campsites, a primitive group-camping area, boat launch and fishing pier. The East Landing offers a day use area and boat launch.

== See also ==
- Louisiana State Arboretum
- List of Louisiana state parks
