= Lombard Plantation =

- U.S. Historic district – Contributing property
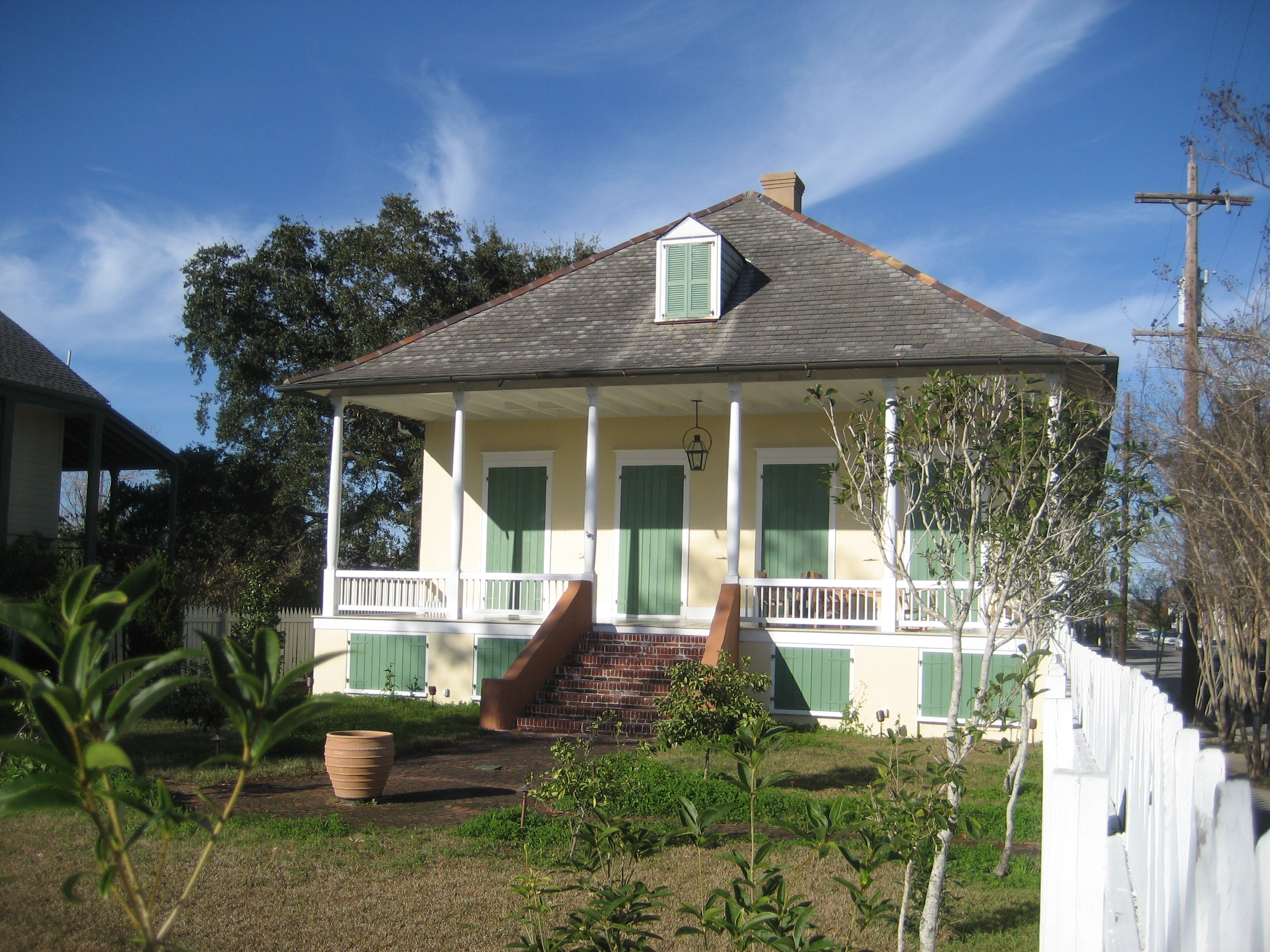
- Lombard Plantation house in January 2008

- Location within Louisiana
- Location: Bartholomew St., New Orleans, Louisiana
- Coordinates: 29.9609°N 90.0370°W
- Built: 1825
- Part of: Bywater Historic District (ID86000113)
- Designated CP: January 23, 1986

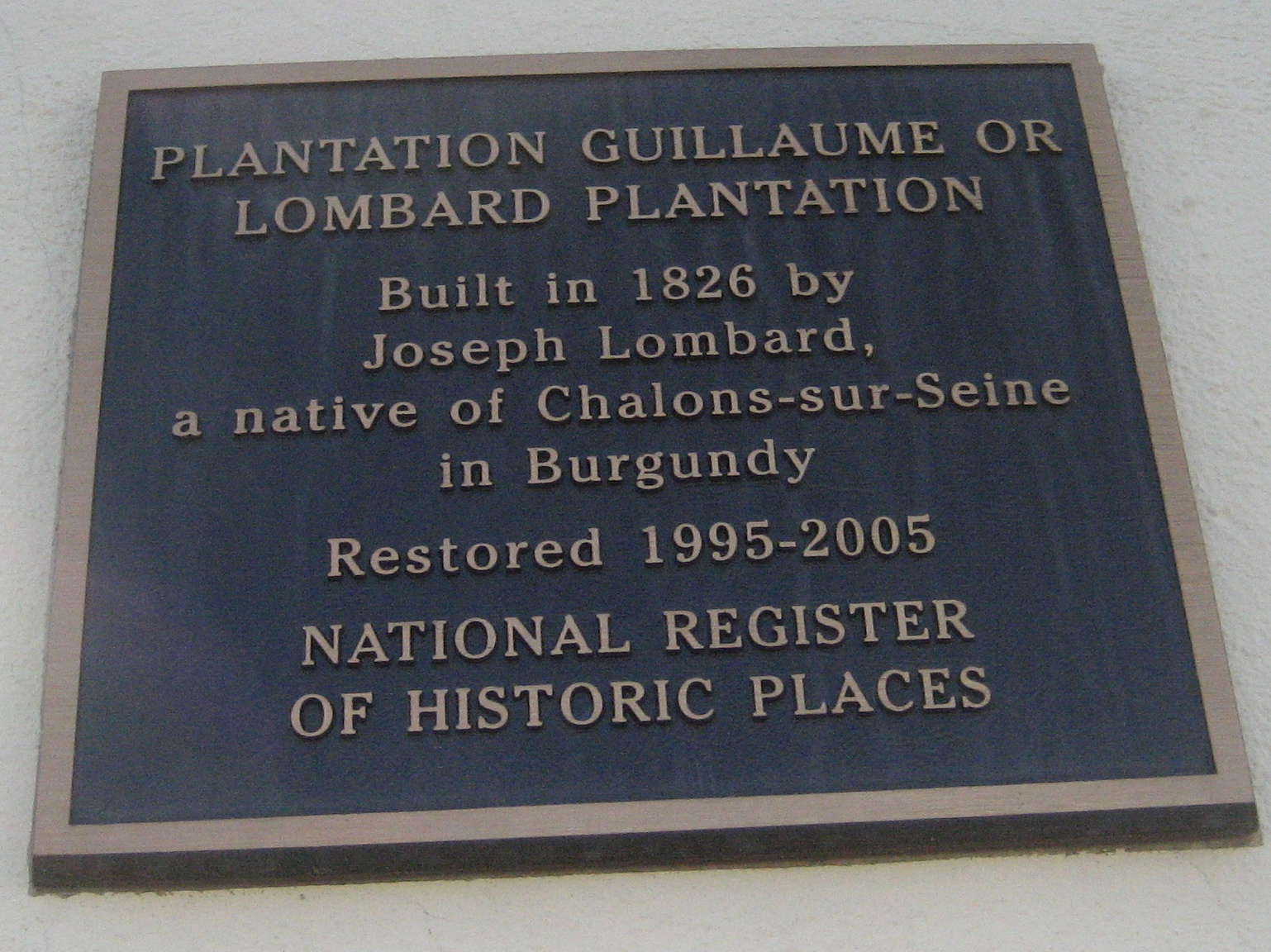
Plaque on Lombard Plantation house

Lombard Plantation formerly existed in what is now an urbanized section of Bywater, New Orleans on the Mississippi River in the Ninth Ward of New Orleans, Louisiana. The only major remains of the former plantation is the Lombard House, the former planation "big house", with a small yard including cistern foundations. A kitchen building on the rear lot was rebuilt according to period designs.

Named for Joseph Lombard pere, the purchaser of the plot of land for his son, the tract of land was acquired October 25, 1825. In a series of transactions, the land was sold back to Lombard to improve the land for $7,500. He then sold the improved land back to his son, Joseph Guilaume, with the plantation house for $13,000; the 1825-1926 transaction records establish the value of the building was $5,500. The plantation property boundaries began with Mississippi River fronted property 96 acres (39 ha) (1.5 arpents) and 1.45 miles (2.33 km) (40 arpents) towards Lake Pontchartrain. The sale to Guilaume included a kitchen house, eight cows, two mules, carts, and two slaves. The Lombard family owned the plantation for less than a decade; the land and house was sold April 11, 1833 to Phillipe Guesnon for a lucrative sum of $50,000 (~$1.78 million in 2025) for unknown reasons. The grounds were split between the heirs.

On January 20, 1835, the house and land were auctioned off to Frenchman Jean Louise Grasse; the bill of sale to Grasse described the property as "une belle maison..." Grasse died March 1843 in debt, his widow renounced her succession of the plantation in order to pay off the debt. The Durands (property owners from 1843 to 1864) re-assembled the property and continued to use the plantation for commercial agriculture. Charles Caffin controlled the plantation from 1864 to 1880; during his tenure he added a cast iron cornstalk fence to the property, which lasted until the 1960s.

In 1878, the building was auctioned, the parcel was subdivided again and within a decade shotgun houses were built within the property boundaries. In 1930, Heinrich Buthmann controlled the house as an art shop and residence. The next owner, Watkin Eschette, converted the basement into two rentals and sold off the backyard. In the mid to late 50s, the front yard was sold and developed as a cinder block bikers bar.

In 2002, the bar and the lot were sold to the current owner, Frederick Starr. The bar was immediately demolished. After Hurricane Katrina, the owner was able to purchase the former backyard and reunited the immediate part of the property.

== Architectural description ==
The West Indian plantation home was most likely designed by Haitian Creole surveyor-architect Pilie. A raised house on pillars, in the 1950s the basement was filled in for rental units. The facade has plaster walls with five openings evenly spaced; the staircase in the center of the porch opens outwards to the yard and divides the six pillars supporting the overhangs. The roof is hipped with a central dormer on each elevation, it also has deep overhangs creating porches on the facade and the rear elevation.

The building has a raised basement, a main floor with five rooms, and an attic. The rooms on the main floor are a reception room, dining room seating twelve, small dining room for family use, salon, bedroom, and an office. The attic has Norman trussing. Four vertical cypress beams come down from the roof. Rectangular connections at the base of the roof redistribute the tension to the exterior walls. There are no support beams that connect the roof to the floor plate. Each beam was inscribed with roman numerals and connected to one another with a mortise and peg system.

== Restoration ==
Over the last decade the plantation home has been restored back to its initial construction by the current owner. The raised basement has a repointed foundation, excess wiring and plumbing were removed, the cypress beams were reinforced with iron. Wood windows were restored, paint was stripped in all rooms and colors close to the originals were chosen, including the "french blue" line beneath the ceilings of the main bedrooms and a good line in the dining room. Chemical analysis in the dining room revealed the turquoise color and the gold stenciling painted by local artist Patricia Cummings.

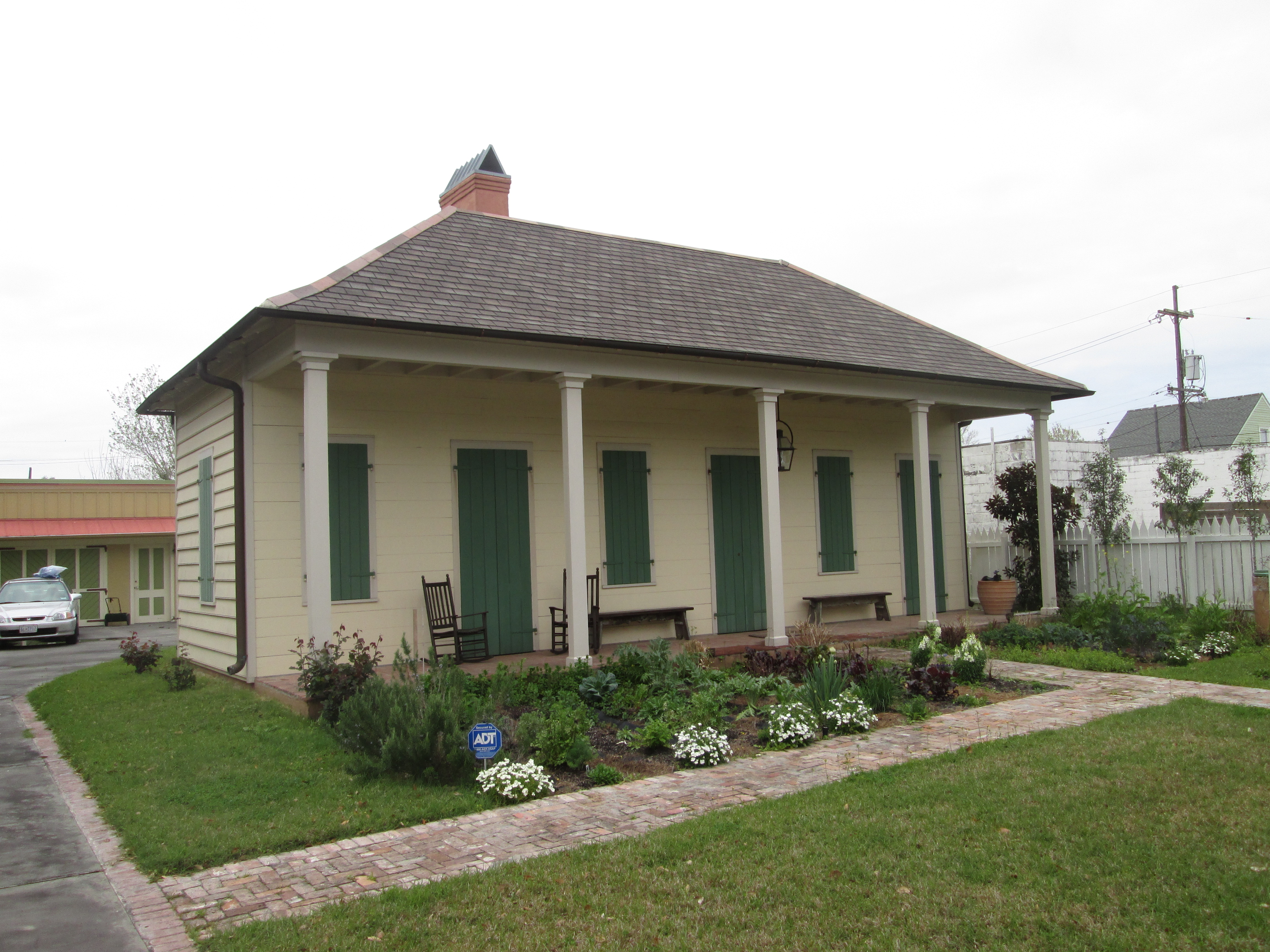
the reconstructed kitchen building in 2014

The kitchen house was completely reconstructed from the 1843 notarial archives drawings by J.A. Pueyo and historic architect, Rick Fifield. The plan showed the ground plan of the kitchen and a painting of an overseer's cottage, allowing additional details and assumptions of the style and scale of the kitchen house. That plan pointed to the location of the kitchen house which lead to excavation of the site. Brick flooring, shutter hinges, and part of the fireplace were discovered. The owner and his consultants were able to examine the house for clues of how the kitchen house would have been built, for example, the chimney in the house was a reference point for the construction of the chimney where it meets the roof. https://savingplaces.org/stories/period-piece-creole-style-house-new-orleans#.WHPlSfkrLIU
