= Tammany Trace =

Rail trail in Louisiana, USA

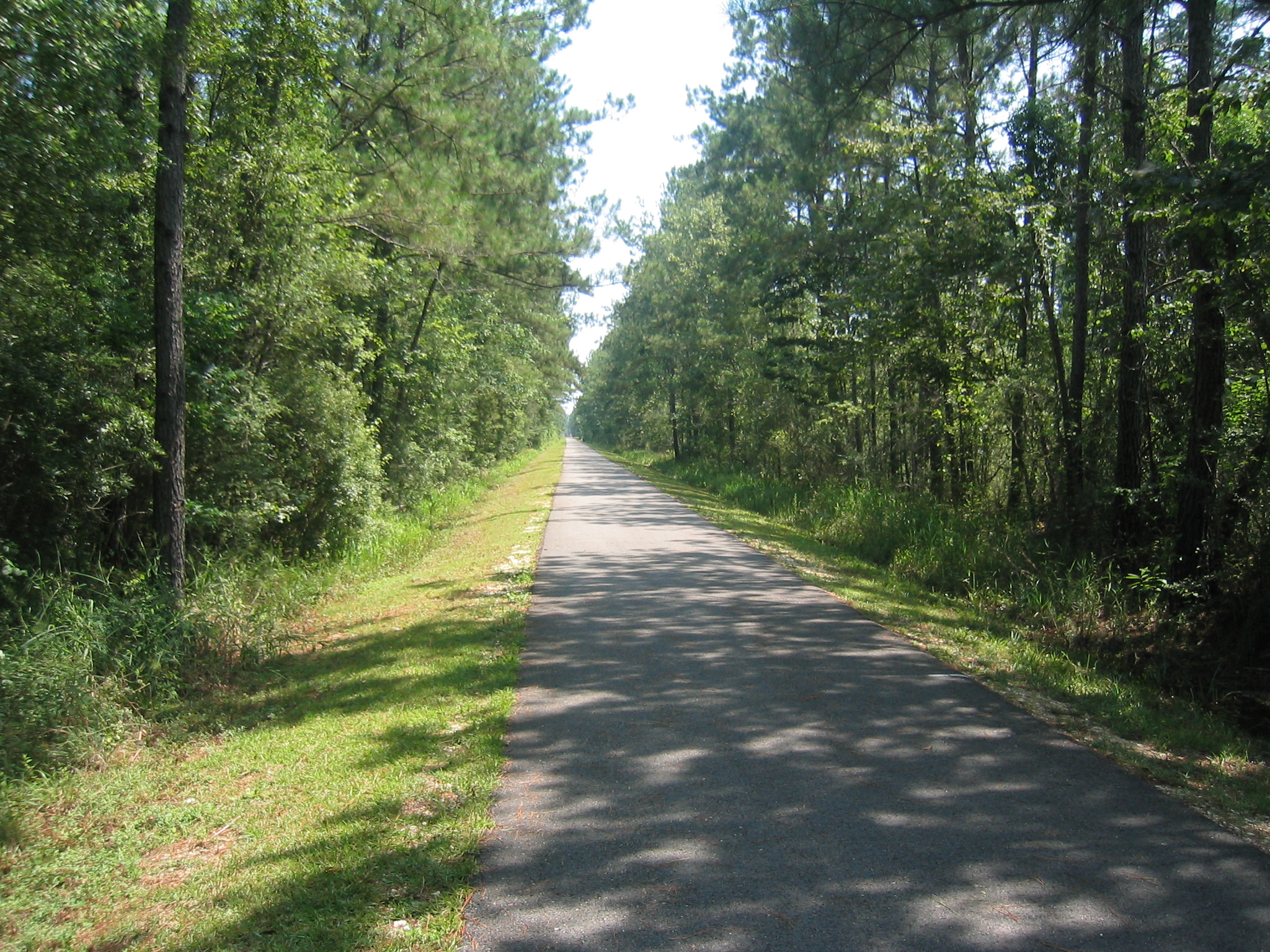
Tammany Trace near Mandeville

The Tammany Trace is a rail trail in St. Tammany Parish, Louisiana, occupying a former Illinois Central Railroad corridor.

It has been developed into a 31-mile (50 km) asphalt trail for hiking, cycling, and wheelchair use. Some parts of the Trace include a separate equestrian pathway suitable for horse riding.

It connects Covington, Abita Springs, Mandeville, Lacombe, and Slidell, running along the northern shore of Lake Pontchartrain. The trail was damaged by Hurricane Katrina in 2005, but was reopened by early 2007. The Trace is easily accessible from Fontainebleau State Park.

== Location ==
Point	Coordinates
West end of the trail	30.477°N 90.094°W
59 trailhead/caboose	30.417°N 90.044°W
Lafitte Gerard trailhead	30.363°N 90.062°W
Lacombe trailhead	30.309°N 89.930°W
Slidell/Carollo trailhead	30.301°N 89.833°W
East end of the trail	30.297°N 89.780°W

== See also ==
- List of rail trails
