= St. Bernard State Park =

State park in Louisiana, United States

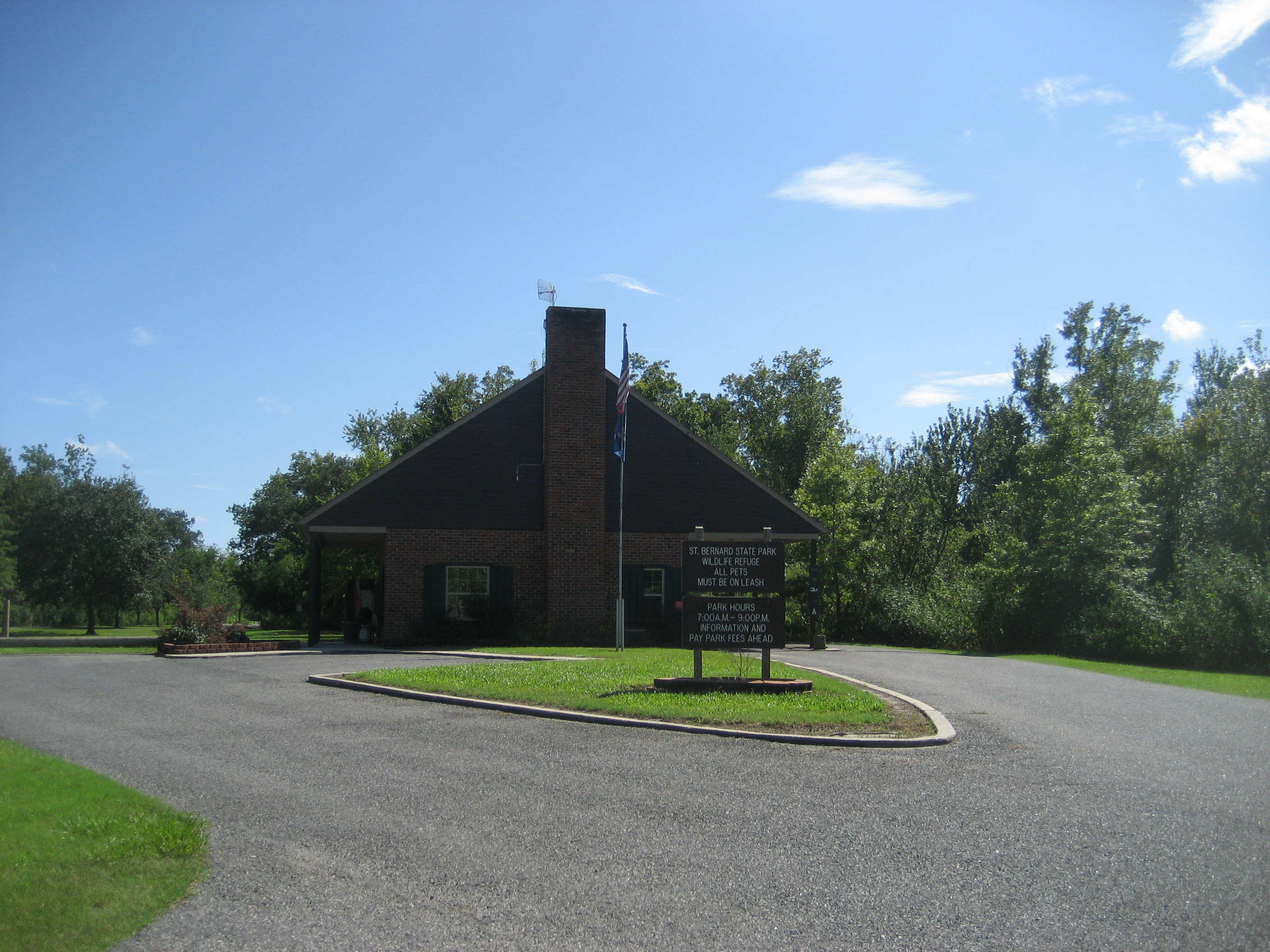
- Park entrance at Poydras, Louisiana

- Location within Louisiana
- Location: St. Bernard Parish, Louisiana, United States
- Nearest city: Braithwaite or Poydras
- Coordinates: 29°51′41″N 89°54′03″W
- Area: 358 acres (1.45 km^{2}; 0.559 sq mi)
- Established: 1971
- Visitors: 45,671 (in 2022)
- Governing body: Louisiana Office of State Parks
- Website: Official website

St. Bernard State Park is a state park located in the American state of Louisiana, on a tract of land in St. Bernard Parish, between the towns of Poydras and Caernarvon. Though located only approximately eighteen miles southeast of New Orleans, attendance had been fledgling at the park for years, ranking among the least visited in the state.

== History ==
The St. Bernard State Park was created in 1971 when the land that the park sits on was donated to the state by local businessman and former State Senator Lynn Dean and his wife Jackie. The park operated for 34 years as the only state park in the St. Bernard/Plaquemines Parish area until it was severely damaged by storm surge from the levee failures during Hurricane Katrina. The park (along with Fort Pike State Historic Site) remained closed for more than a year due to the severe damage but is now in full operation for camping, birdwatching and day use.

== Facilities ==
St. Bernard State Park includes the following facilities as compared to that which is available at certain other Louisiana state parks as well as a waterpark and playground for children:

Boating	Cabins	Dump Stations	Group Tents	Improved Campsites	Lodges	Picnic Areas	Playgrounds	Restrooms	Swimming	Tent Campsites	Trails	Unimproved Campsites
No	No	Yes	No	Yes; 51	No	Yes	Yes	Yes	No	Yes	Yes; nature trail	No

== Restoration ==
St. Bernard State Park suffered extensive damage as a result of Hurricane Katrina. The park was re-opened with a ceremony Tuesday, December 19, 2006, at 4 p.m. with ceremonies by then Lt. Gov. Mitch Landrieu, local dignitaries, local choirs, followed by hayride tours of the site, coffee, hot chocolate and cookies.

== See also ==
- List of Louisiana state parks
