= Bayou Castine =

Stream in Louisiana, U.S.

Coordinates: 30.36429°N 90.02575°W

Bayou Castine is a stream in the U.S. state of Louisiana.

== Name ==
Bayou Castine is a name derived from the Choctaw language meaning "river of fleas".

Variant names are:

- Bayou Castin
- Big Bayou Castin
- Castein
- Castein Bayou
- Castein Bayouque
- Casteinbayouque
- Castembayouque
- Castimbayouque
- Castin Bayou
- Castine Bayou
- Le Petit Castaing
