= Lake Chicot, Louisiana =

Lake in Louisiana, United States

Coordinates: 30°48′02″N 92°16′29″W

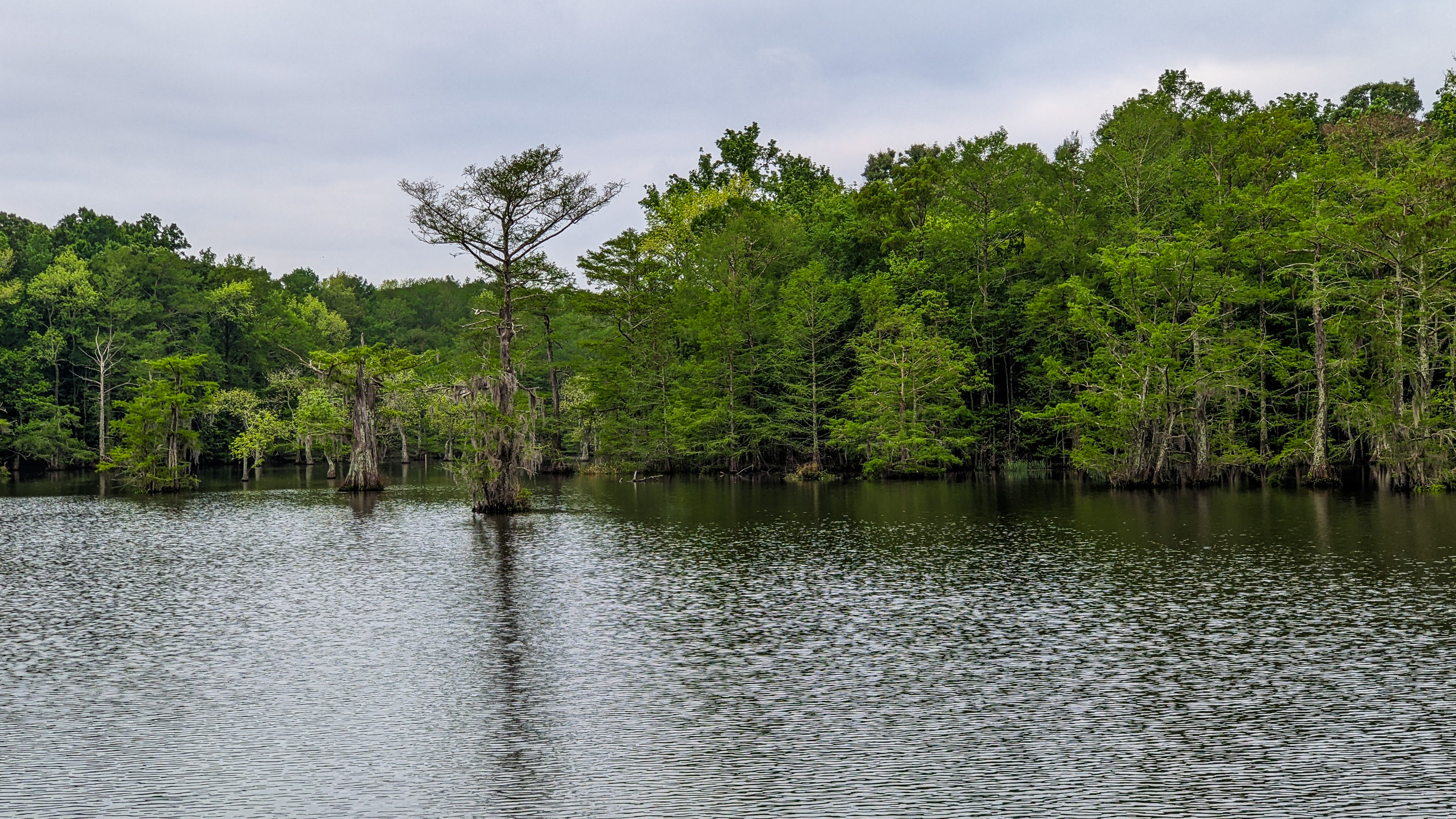
Lake Chicot, Louisiana in 2022

Lake Chicot is a man-made lake in Chicot State Park in Evangeline Parish, Louisiana. It was created in the early 1930s by the Civilian Conservation Corps damming Bayou Chicot. It covers some 2,000 acres, with an average depth of 7 to 8 feet.
