= List of corporations in New Orleans =

This is a list of major corporations headquartered in the metropolitan area of New Orleans, Louisiana.

== Fortune 500 companies based in New Orleans ==
There is one Fortune 500 company headquartered in the New Orleans metropolitan area.

- 355 Entergy (energy)

== Other public companies ==
- First Guaranty Bank (financial)
- Globalstar (telecommunications)
- Pool Corporation (swimming pools)
- Hornbeck Offshore (maritime)

== Large private companies ==
Sources:

- Abita Brewing Company (alcoholic beverages)
- The Advocate (media)
- Bevolo Gas and Electric Lights (light fixtures)
- Bollinger Enterprises (shipbuilding)
- First Bank and Trust (financial)
- Globalstar (telecommunications)
- International-Matex Tank Terminals (bulk liquid storage)
- Laitram (industrial)
- LCMC Health Systems (healthcare)
- Loyola University (education)
- New Orleans Pelicans
- New Orleans Saints
- Ochsner Health Systems (healthcare)
- Pan-American Life Insurance Co. (insurance)
- Port of New Orleans (maritime)
- Port of South Louisiana (maritime)
- Sazerac Company (alcoholic beverages)
- Textron Marine & Land Systems (defense)
- Tulane University (education)
- Wm. B. Reily & Company, Inc. (food and beverage)
- Zatarain's (food and beverage)
