= Abita River =

Location
- Country: United States
- State: Louisiana
- Parish: St. Tammany
- Cities: Abita Springs, Covington

Physical characteristics
- Source
  - location: St. Tammany Parish, Louisiana
  - coordinates: 30°29′08″N 90°00′31″W
- Mouth: Bogue Falaya
  - location: Covington, St. Tammany Parish, Louisiana
  - coordinates: 30°27′16″N 90°06′10″W
- Length: 9.3-mile (15.0 km)

Basin features
- Tributaries
  - right: Abita Creek

The Abita River is a 9.3-mile (15.0 km) river in southeastern Louisiana, United States. It is a tributary of the Bogue Falaya, which flows into the Tchefuncte River and ultimately Lake Pontchartrain.

== Course ==
The river originates in central St. Tammany Parish and flows west-southwest through Abita Springs before joining the Bogue Falaya near Covington.

== Natural and Scenic River designation ==
The entire length of the Abita River is part of the Louisiana Natural and Scenic Rivers System, which provides legal protection for streams with ecological and recreational value.

== Ecology ==
The river basin includes the Abita Creek Flatwoods Preserve, managed by The Nature Conservancy. The preserve protects longleaf pine savanna and supports rare plant species such as pitcher plants.

== Cultural significance ==
The name "Abita" is derived from a Choctaw word meaning "fountain." The river and its springs were historically used by Indigenous peoples and later became central to the development of Abita Springs as a health resort in the 19th century.

== Recreation ==
The Abita River is used for canoeing and kayaking, and the surrounding preserve offers hiking opportunities.

== Variant names ==
According to the Geographic Names Information System, historical names for the Abita River include:

- Abeter Bayou
- Bayou Abeter
- Bayou Abita

== See also ==
- List of Louisiana Natural and Scenic Rivers
- Abita Springs, Louisiana
