= List of Louisiana Natural and Scenic Rivers =

The Louisiana Natural and Scenic Rivers System was established in 1970, administered by the Louisiana Department of Wildlife and Fisheries, and includes approximately 3000 miles of waterways.

== North Louisiana ==
- Bayou Bartholomew - 080401
- Bayou D'Arbonne - 080605
- Bayou de L'Outre - 080501
- Bayou Dorcheat - 100501
- Black Lake Bayou - 100702
- Corney Bayou - 080607 and 080609
- Middle Fork Bayou D'Arbonne - 080610
- Ouachita River- 80101
- Saline Bayou (Bienville Parish) - 100801

== Central Louisiana ==
- Bayou Cocodrie (Concordia Parish) - 101601
- Bayou Cocodrie (Evangeline Parish) - 060201
- Bayou Kisatchie - 101103
- Big Creek - 081608
- Calcasieu River - 030102
- Fish Creek - 081606
- Little River - 081601 and 081602
- Pearl Creek - 110202
- Saline Bayou (Catahoula & LaSalle Parishes) - 101504
- Six Mile Creek - 030504
- Spring Creek (Louisiana) -060101
- Ten Mile Creek - 030505
- Trout Creek – 081607
- Whiskey Chitto Creek - 030502

== South Louisiana ==
- Amite River - 040301
- Bashman Bayou - 041803
- Bayou Bienvenue - 042002
- Bayou Cane - 040903 and 040904
- Bayou Chaperon - 041802
- Bayou Chinchuba - 040904
- Bayou des Allemands - 020201 and 020301
- Bayou Dupre - 041804
- Bayou LaBranche - 041201
- Bayou Lacombe - 040901 and 040902
- Bayou St. John - 041301
- Bayou Trepagnier - 041202
- Blind River - 040401 and 040403
- Bogue Chitto River - 090501
- Bogue Falaya River - 040804
- Bradley Slough - 090206
- Comite River - 040102
- Holmes Bayou - 090106
- Lake Borgne Canal - 041805
- Morgan River – 090202-5126
- Pirogue Bayou - 041806
- Pushepatapa Creek - 090301
- Tangipahoa River – 040701 and 040702
- Tchefuncte River – 040801, 040802 and 040803
- Terre Beau Bayou - 041807
- Tickfaw River - 040501
- West Pearl River - 090201 and 090202
- Wilson Slough - 090205
