= FGB =

FGB may refer to:

- Fibrinogen beta chain, encoded by the FGB gene
- First Guaranty Bank, an American bank
- First Gulf Bank, an Emirati bank
- Franco-German Brigade, a unit of the Eurocorps
- Führer Grenadier Brigade, a unit of the Germany Army active during World War II
- Functional Cargo Block (Russian: функционально-грузовой блок, Funktsionalno-gruzovoy blok), a spacecraft and International Space Station component
