= Don Muhlbach =

American football player (born 1981)

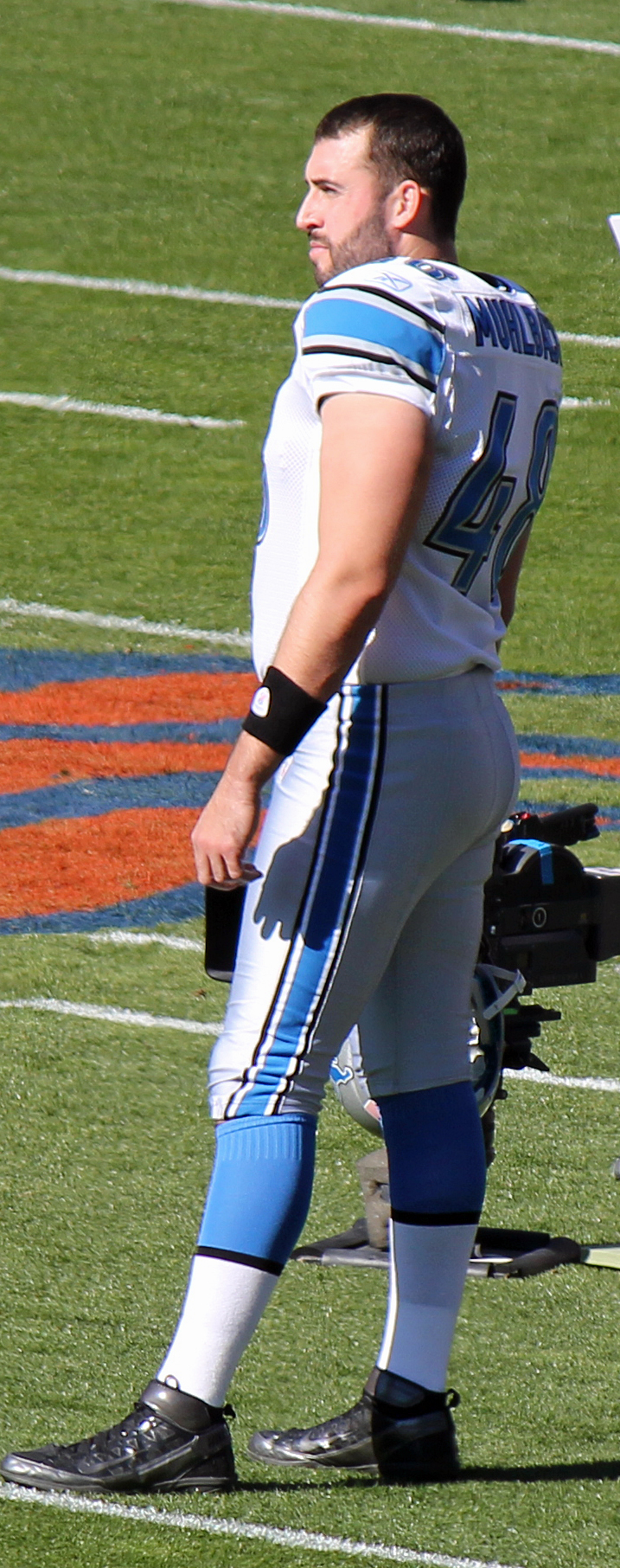
- Muhlbach with the Lions in 2011

Detroit Lions
- Title: Special assistant to the team president

Personal information
- Born: August 17, 1981 (age 45); Newark, Ohio, U.S.
- Listed height: 6 ft 4 in (1.93 m)
- Listed weight: 258 lb (117 kg)

Career information
- High school: Lufkin (Lufkin, Texas)
- College: Texas A&M (1999–2003)
- NFL draft: 2004: undrafted

Career history

Playing
- Baltimore Ravens (2004)*; Detroit Lions (2004–2020)
- * Offseason or practice squad member only

Operations
- Detroit Lions (2021–present) Special assistant to the team president

Awards and highlights
- 2× Pro Bowl (2012, 2018); Detroit Lions All-Time Team

Career NFL statistics
- Games played: 260
- Total tackles: 26
- Forced fumbles: 1
- Stats at Pro Football Reference

Donald Lynn Muhlbach Jr. (MULE-bach; born August 17, 1981) is an American former professional football player who was a long snapper in the National Football League (NFL). He played college football for the Texas A&M Aggies and was signed as an undrafted free agent in 2004 by the Baltimore Ravens before joining the Detroit Lions that same year. Muhlbach is second in Lions franchise history in games played, only behind former teammate Jason Hanson. Muhlbach was the last remaining active member of the Lions infamous 2008 season, where they went 0–16. At the time of his retirement, he was the oldest active player in the NFL other than Tom Brady.

== Early life ==
Muhlbach attended Lufkin High School in Lufkin, Texas. As a senior football player, he was the Lufkin special team's most valuable player, and earned Academic All-District honors.

== College career ==
Muhlbach attended Texas A&M University, where he served as the team's long snapper for the 2003 season. He also saw action at punter as a sophomore during the 2001 season.

== Professional career ==
Muhlbach signed as an undrafted free agent with the Baltimore Ravens on April 30, 2004. He spent the summer and OTAs with the Ravens before being released during training camp on August 30, 2004. On November 10, 2004, the Detroit Lions signed him as a replacement for injured long snapper Jody Littleton. Prior to joining the Lions, he had tried out for the team and the Buffalo Bills and was working at a First Bank and Trust in Lufkin, Texas. Upon his signing, Muhlbach was described as "the Nolan Ryan of long snappers" by then-general manager Matt Millen; Millen was referring to the speed at which the ball is snapped to the holder or punter, with Muhlbach having the quickest snaps of those the team timed.

Early in his Lions career, Muhlbach overcame the adversity brought on by a botched snap against the Minnesota Vikings in a December 20, 2004 game. Holder Nick Harris was unable to cleanly field a bounced snap on a PAT attempt with 8 seconds remaining in the game. The missed PAT and unsuccessful onside kick resulted in the Lions falling in regulation to the Vikings 28–27. Had the PAT been successful, the game likely would have gone to overtime, giving the Lions an opportunity for a win. The Lions' faith in Muhlbach since paid off as he did not botch another snap through 2012.

Muhlbach played in every Lions game since 2005 outside of a single game in 2009 due to a concussion. Following the 2012 season, Muhlbach was named to the 2013 Pro Bowl, the first of his career. He was also the first Lions long snapper to make a Pro Bowl. Since 2015, Muhlbach signed consecutive one-year contracts to stay with the Lions.

Muhlbach was released by the Lions on August 17, 2021, his 40th birthday, after 17 seasons with the team. Following his release, Muhlbach retired from the NFL, and joined the Lions' front office as a special assistant to the team president.

== Personal life ==
Muhlbach is married to Alix Koetting. On August 24, 2012, she gave birth to their first daughter, Addison. His uncle, John Muhlbach, was a center for Ohio State.
