= Mardi Paws =

Animal welfare procession in the U.S.

Mystic Krewe of Mardi Paws
- Named after: Mardi Gras
- Formation: 1994; 32 years ago
- Founders: Denise Gutnistky
- Founded at: Mandeville, Louisiana
- Type: Carnival Krewe
- Legal status: Non-profit organization
- Purpose: Animal welfare
- Headquarters: Covington, Louisiana
- Location: Covington, LA
- Origins: Mandeville, LA
- Website: www.mardipaws.com

Mardi Paws is an annual Mardi Gras parade held in Covington, Louisiana, in the United States. The event promotes animal welfare and features costumed pets walking through the streets with their owners to raise awareness and support for local animal-related causes.

== History ==
The Krewe of Mardi Paws is a nonprofit organization which was founded in 1994 by Denise Gutnisky as a small dog parade with the aim of raising funds for animal shelters. Beginning in 1999, the parade adopted a new theme each year. Originally launched in Mandeville, Louisiana, the event was relocated to Covington in 2020.

Another event the organization started is Mutts to Models, also held in Mandeville, where local personalities walk in a fashion show with their dogs. The Mystic Krewe of Mardi Paws has put on several adoption events as well as smaller fundraising events such as Mutts & Moonshine. This event benefited TADSAW, (Train a Dog, Save a Warrior), a charity based in Texas that works with veterans and service dogs. In 2020, they hosted "Trunk or Treat", a Halloween costume contest benefiting the St. Tammany Parish Animal Shelter. In October 2020, they hosted "Mardi Paws geauxs pink" to help raise awareness for breast cancer.

The Bacchus was the first Mardi Gras Krewe to have a celebrity appear as its monarch, also making it the first dog parade to do so. This was actor Ian Somerhalder in 2014, who was born and raised in Covington, Louisiana. Somerhalder's last appearance at the event was in 2020.

The parade, typically held the first Sunday after Mardi Gras, was not thrown in 2021 due to the COVID-19 pandemic, but they took inspiration from New Orleans in making dog house floats.

== Parade ==
The Mystic Krewe of Mardi Paws runs during the New Orleans Mardi Gras season, on the first Sunday after Fat Tuesday.

| Year | Theme |
|---|---|
| 1994-1997 | No theme |
| 1998 | Where Y'at Dawlin' |
| 1999 | Walk on the Wild Side! |
| 2000 | Every Dog has its Day! |
| 2001 | Dog-gone with the Wind |
| 2002 | "PAWS"itively Patriotic! |
| 2003 | Mardi Paws Goes to HOWL-YWOOD! |
| 2004 | Olympic Com"PAW"tition |
| 2005 | Puppy Love |
| 2006 | Year of the Dog |
| 2007 | Mardi Paws Does Disney |
| 2008 | It's a Dog's Life |
| 2009 | Mardi Paws Tunes in to TV! |
| 2010 | Around the World |
| 2011 | Diggin' Louisiana |
| 2012 | Mardi Paws Goes Bark in Time |
| 2013 | Mardi Paws Gets Doggone Wet |
| 2014 | Live from the Red Carpet |
| 2015 | Mardi Paws Takes a Road Trip |
| 2016 | Love is in the Hair |
| 2017 | Under the Big Top |
| 2018 | Fables, Fairy Tales & Nursery Rhymes |
| 2019 | Super Paws |
| 2020 | Beyond All Boundaries: Exploring Sea, Air & Space |
| 2021 | Pups are "In the House" |
| 2022 | 80s Pawp Culture |
| 2023 | Tales from the Barkside |
| 2024 | Bark 'n' Roll |
| 2025 | Taking The Game to the Streets |

=== Charities ===
- Ian Somerhalder Foundation
- Scott's Wish
- St. Tammany Spay & Neuter
- Miracle League
- Children's Hospital
- TADSAW
- St. Tammany Parish Animal Shelter
- Capital Area Animal Welfare Society
- Take Paws Rescue
- OneHope Wine
