= Ian Somerhalder =

American actor (born 1978)

- Somerhalder in 2026
- Born: Ian Joseph Somerhalder; December 8, 1978 (age 47); Covington, Louisiana, U.S.
- Occupations: Actor; business owner
- Years active: 1997–2024
- Spouse: Nikki Reed (m. 2015)
- Children: 2

Ian Joseph Somerhalder (/ˈsʌmərhɔːldər/ SUM-ər-hawl-dər; born December 8, 1978) is an American retired actor. He is known for playing Boone Carlyle in ABC's science fiction adventure drama television series Lost (2004–2010) and Damon Salvatore in the CW supernatural teen drama series The Vampire Diaries (2009–2017).

== Early life ==
Somerhalder was born on December 8, 1978, in Covington, Louisiana. His mother, Edna (née Israel), is a massage therapist of Choctaw and Irish descent from Mississippi, while his father, Robert Somerhalder Sr., is an independent building contractor of Cajun descent. The second of three children, Somerhalder has an elder brother and a younger sister.

Somerhalder graduated from Saint Paul's School. He embarked on a modeling career from age 10 to 13. His parents divorced when he was 14, and he subsequently lived with his mother. At age 17, Somerhalder decided to refocus on acting and began studying with acting teacher William Esper.

== Career ==
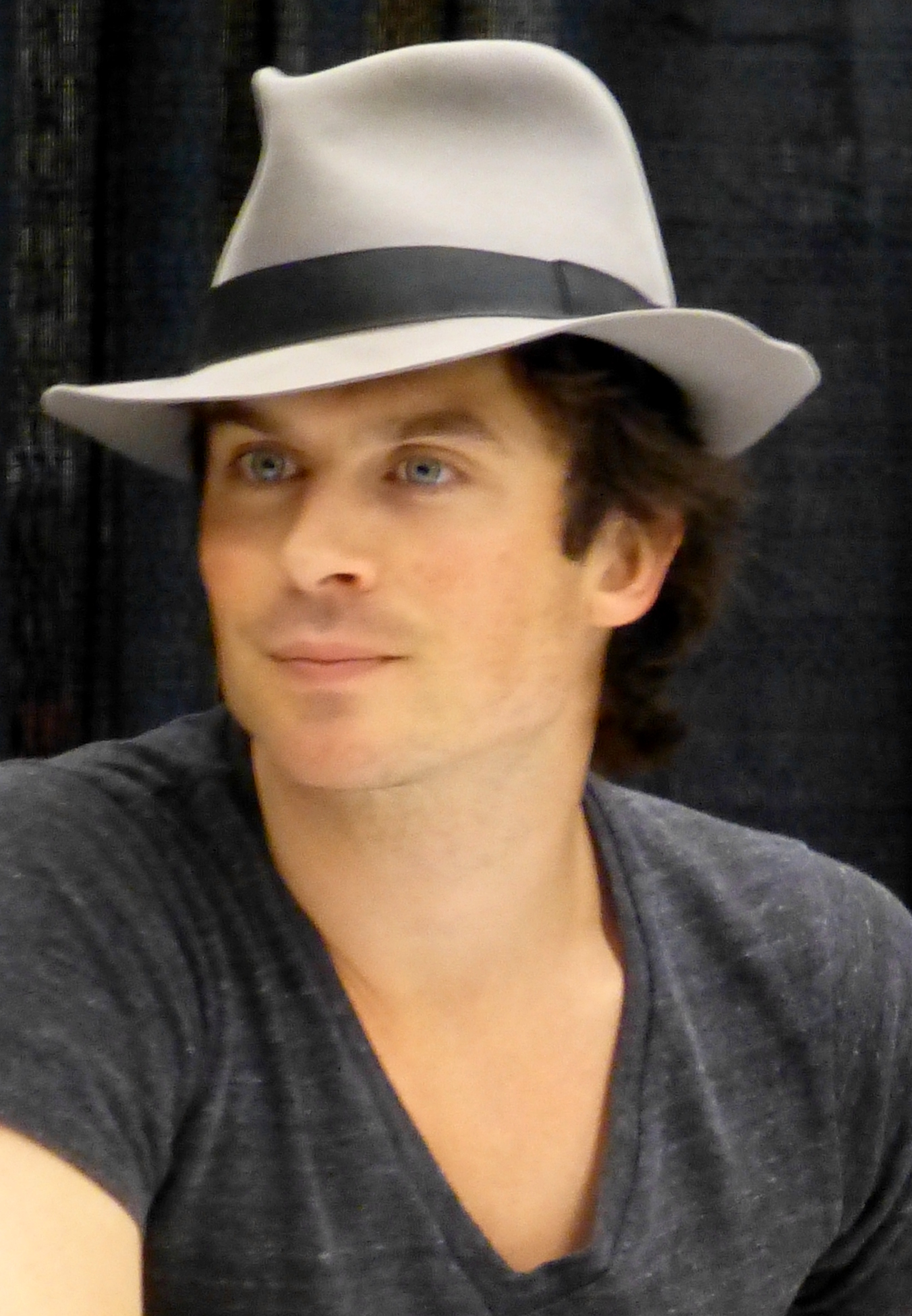
Somerhalder at the 2015 Wizard World Convention

In the summer of 2000, Somerhalder starred in the short-lived WB series Young Americans, a spin-off of Dawson's Creek. He played Hamilton Fleming, the son of the dean of a prestigious boarding school. In 2002, Somerhalder played bisexual character Paul Denton in Roger Avary's adaptation of Bret Easton Ellis' novel, The Rules of Attraction, alongside James Van Der Beek, Shannyn Sossamon, and Jessica Biel.

In 2004, Somerhalder scored his breakthrough role when he played Boone Carlyle in Lost. Despite his character's death in the twentieth episode of the first season, he returned to the role of Boone for seven more episodes between 2005 and 2010, including the series finale. He was the first major character to die. Following his departure from the show, ABC signed him to another one-year contract. In 2005, he stated that being a part of Lost was "the greatest experience" of "the greatest year of his life".

In 2009, Somerhalder appeared in the movie The Tournament where he played the role of an assassin participating in a lethal competition with other assassins. He appears in the coffee table book About Face by celebrity photographer John Russo. Also in 2009, Somerhalder began playing the role of Vampire Damon Salvatore as a series regular in The CW television drama series The Vampire Diaries. The series premiere attracted The CW's highest premiere ratings of any season premiere since the network began in 2006. The series has continued to be the highest-rated series on its channel with both his performance and the show receiving a positive response from critics. He began directing The Vampire Diaries in its third season and produced the series at the start of season 8. He received several Teen Choice Awards and a People's Choice Award for his participation on the series.

Somerhalder acted in the short subject Time Framed (2013). He played Dr. Luther Swann as a series regular in the Netflix science fiction horror series V Wars, which ran from 2019 to 2020.

In 2020, Somerhalder shot footage for and served as an executive producer on the film Kiss the Ground, a documentary centered on regenerative agriculture. He returned as an executive producer on its follow-up documentary, Common Ground, in 2023.

In a 2024 interview, Somerhalder revealed that he had retired from acting after relocating to a farm outside of Los Angeles, though he would still be involved in producing and environmental activism.

== Foundations and causes ==
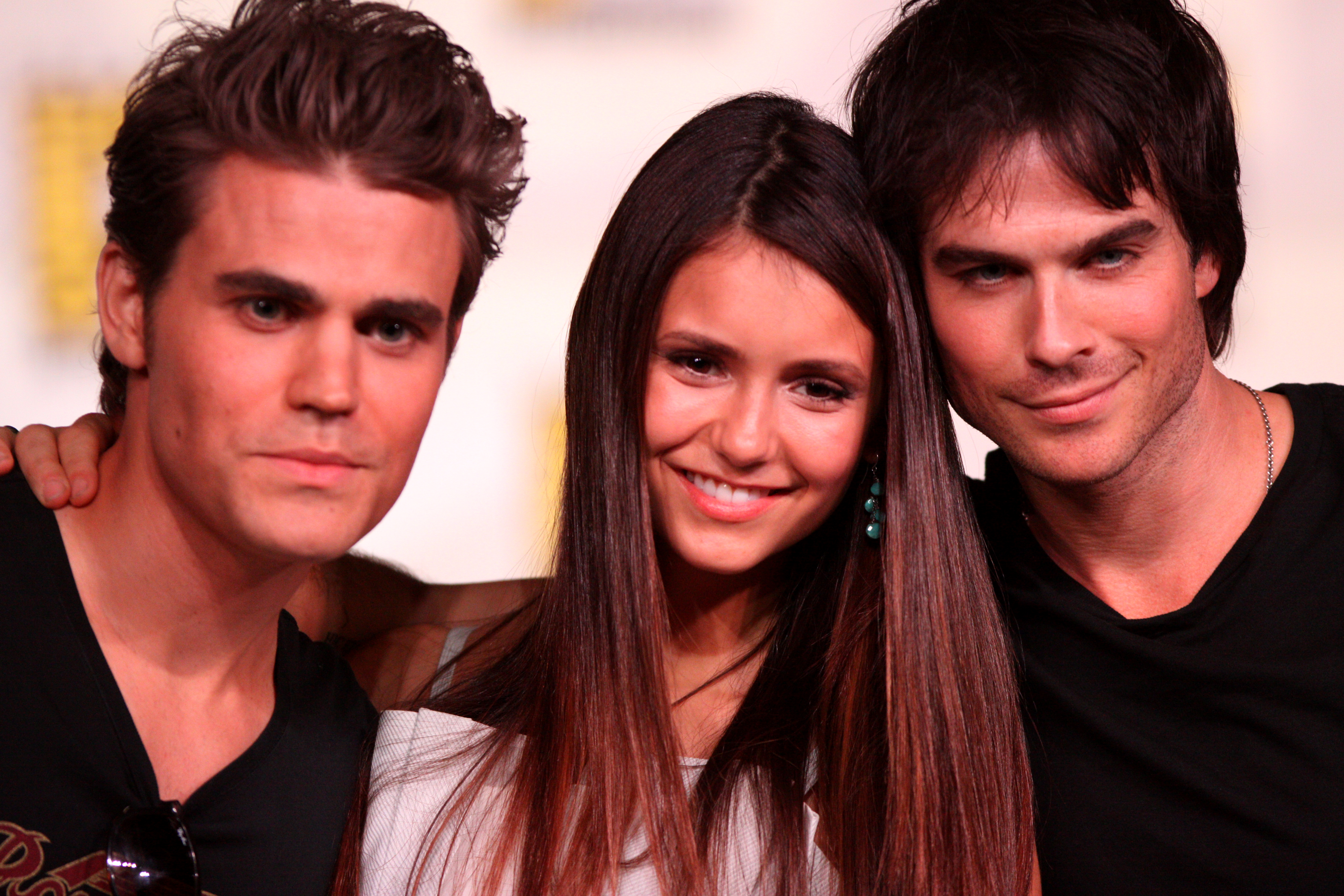
Paul Wesley, Nina Dobrev and Somerhalder in 2012

Somerhalder was involved in the cleanup after the Deepwater Horizon oil drilling disaster on April 22, 2010. His efforts included cleaning of oiled wildlife and taping public service announcements to let the public know how they could help. Somerhalder also supports the St. Tammany Humane Society, an organization for animal shelter and welfare. On November 13, 2010, he hosted a Bash on the Bayou charity fundraiser for the Society. During the event, Somerhalder was presented with a donation of $11,100 by The Vampire Diaries fandom for his birthday project.

Together with his The Vampire Diaries co-stars Candice Accola and Michael Trevino, Somerhalder supports the It Gets Better Project, which makes it a goal to prevent suicide among LGBT youth associated with The Trevor Project. For his second campaign, Somerhalder teamed up with The Vampire Diaries co-star Paul Wesley to release a limited edition shirt designed by a fan, with the words "Blood Brothers Since 1864." This campaign sold almost 10,000 shirts.

On December 8, 2010, Somerhalder's 32nd birthday, he launched the "Ian Somerhalder Foundation" which he hopes will educate people on the importance of protecting the environment and animals: "Instead of gifts this year, my birthday wish is that we come together and raise funds to support projects that protect our habitat and nurture our furry friends." To spread awareness for his foundation, Somerhalder sponsors and often walks in Mardi Paws, a parade and organization held in his hometown of Covington. He opposes GMO foods and factory farming, and supports ecologist Allan Savory in his crusade to let cows graze in sync with nature to enrich soil, enhance biodiversity, and reverse climate change. In 2011, Somerhalder visited Savory in Africa and announced he was making a documentary about him with the goal of winning him a Nobel Prize.

Somerhalder is also a celebrity campaigner for RYOT, a Los Angeles-based media company known for RYOT.org, its cause-based, take action online news source.

== Personal life ==
Somerhalder dated his Vampire Diaries co-star Nina Dobrev from 2010 to 2013. In 2014, he began dating actress Nikki Reed. They married on April 26, 2015, in Malibu, California. They had a daughter in 2017, and a son in 2023.

While working on Lost, Somerhalder and Maggie Grace adopted a feral cat named Roo which that they found "literally dying" in the jungle, and it later became Grace's "travel buddy." Somerhalder stated that being a part of Lost was "the greatest experience" of "the greatest year of his life".

=== Brother's Bond Bourbon ===
Somerhalder has remained close friends with his former Vampire Diaries co-star Paul Wesley, and in 2020, they announced the launch of a straight bourbon whiskey named Brother's Bond Bourbon.

== Filmography ==
=== Film ===
Year	Title	Role	Notes	Ref.
1998	Celebrity	Unconfirmed	Uncredited	
2001	Life as a House	Josh		
2002	Changing Hearts	Jason Kelly		
2002	The Rules of Attraction	Paul Denton		
2004	In Enemy Hands	U.S.S. Swordfish Danny Miller		
2004	The Old Man and the Studio	Matt	Short film	
2006	National Lampoon's TV: The Movie	Unconfirmed	Uncredited	
2006	Pulse	Dexter McCarthy		
2006	The Sensation of Sight	Drifter		
2008	The Lost Samaritan	William Archer		
2009	Wake	Tyler		
2009	The Tournament	Miles Slade		
2010	How to Make Love to a Woman	Daniel Meltzer		
2013	Caught On Tape	Officer Lewis		
2013	Time Framed	Agent Black	Short film	
2014	The Anomaly	Harkin Langham		

=== Television ===
Year	Title	Role	Notes	Ref.
1997	The Big Easy	I.Q.	Episode: "The Black Bag"	
1999	Now and Again	Brian	Episode: "A Girl's Life"	
2000	Young Americans	Hamilton Fleming	Main role	
2001	Anatomy of a Hate Crime	Russell Henderson	TV film	
2002	CSI: Crime Scene Investigation	Tony Del Nagro	Episode: "Revenge Is Best Served Cold"	
2002	Law & Order: Special Victims Unit	Charlie Baker	Episode: "Dominance"	
2003	CSI: Miami	Ricky Murdoch	Episode: "The Best Defense"	
2004	Fearless	Jordan Gracie	Unsold TV pilot	
2004–2007; 2010	Lost	Boone Carlyle	Main role (season 1); Special Guest Star (seasons 2–3, 6); 28 episodes	
2004	Smallville	Adam Knight	6 episodes	
2007	Marco Polo	Marco Polo	TV film	
2007	Tell Me You Love Me	Nick	Recurring role; 6 episodes	
2008	Lost City Raiders	Jack Kubiak	TV film	
2009	Fireball	Lee Cooper	TV film	
2009–2017	The Vampire Diaries	Damon Salvatore	Main role; Producer (season 8)	
2014	Years of Living Dangerously	Himself	Documentary series; Episode: "Ice & Brimstone"	
2019	V Wars	Dr. Luther Swann	Main role; executive producer	
2020	Kiss the Ground	Himself	Documentary; executive producer	

=== Web ===
Year	Title	Role	Notes	Ref.
2009	The Vampire Diaries: A Darker Truth	Damon Salvatore	Episode: "A Darker Truth Part 4"	

=== As director ===
Television
Year	Title	Notes	Ref.
2015	The Vampire Diaries	Episode: "The Downward Spiral"	
2016	The Vampire Diaries	Episode: "Days of Future Past"	
2017	The Vampire Diaries	Episode: "We Have History Together"	
2019	V Wars	Episode: "The Junkie Run of the Predator Gene"	

== Awards and nominations ==
Year	Award	Category	Work	Result	Ref.
2002	Young Hollywood Awards	Exciting New Face – Male	—N/a	Won	
2005	Teen Choice Awards	Choice TV Breakout Performance – Male	Lost	Nominated	
2006	Screen Actors Guild Award	Outstanding Performance by an Ensemble in a Drama Series	Lost (with cast)	Won	
2010	Young Hollywood Awards	Cast to Watch (with Paul Wesley and Nina Dobrev)	The Vampire Diaries	Won	
2010	Teen Choice Awards	Choice TV Villain	The Vampire Diaries	Won	
2010	Teen Choice Awards	Choice Male Hottie	The Vampire Diaries	Nominated	
2011	Teen Choice Awards	Choice TV Actor Fantasy/Sci-Fi	The Vampire Diaries	Won	
2011	Teen Choice Awards	Choice Vampire	The Vampire Diaries	Nominated	
2011	Teen Choice Awards	Choice Male Hottie	The Vampire Diaries	Nominated	
2011	People's Choice Awards	Favorite TV Drama Actor	The Vampire Diaries	Nominated	
2012	People's Choice Awards	Favorite TV Drama Actor	The Vampire Diaries	Nominated	
2012	Genesis Awards	Humane Society	—N/a	Won	
2012	Teen Choice Awards	Choice TV Actor Fantasy/Sci-Fi	The Vampire Diaries	Won	
2012	Teen Choice Awards	Choice Male Hottie	The Vampire Diaries	Won	
2012	Do Something Awards	Best TV Star	The Vampire Diaries	Nominated	
2012	Do Something Awards	Twitter	—N/a	Nominated	
2012	Environmental Media Awards	EMA Futures Award	—N/a	Won	
2012	Fright Night Awards	Favorite Male TV/Movie Vampire	The Vampire Diaries	Won	
2012	International Green Awards	Most Responsible Celebrity	—N/a	Won	
2013	People's Choice Awards	Favorite Dramatic TV Actor	The Vampire Diaries	Nominated	
2013	Teen Choice Awards	Choice TV Actor: Fantasy/Sci-Fi	The Vampire Diaries	Won	
2014	People's Choice Awards	Favorite Sci-Fi/Fantasy TV Actor	The Vampire Diaries	Won	
2014	People's Choice Awards	Favorite On-Screen Chemistry (with Nina Dobrev)	The Vampire Diaries	Won	
2014	mtvU Fandom Awards	Ship of the Year (with Nina Dobrev)	The Vampire Diaries	Won	
2014	Teen Choice Awards	Choice TV Actor Fantasy/Sci-Fi	The Vampire Diaries	Won	
2014	Teen Choice Awards	Choice Male Hottie	The Vampire Diaries	Won	
2014	Teen Choice Awards	Choice Twit	—N/a	Nominated	
2014	Teen Choice Awards	Choice Social Media King	—N/a	Nominated	
2014	Young Hollywood Awards	Best Threesome (with Paul Wesley and Nina Dobrev)	The Vampire Diaries	Won	
2015	People's Choice Awards	Favorite Sci-Fi/Fantasy TV Actor	The Vampire Diaries	Nominated	
2015	People's Choice Awards	Favorite TV Duo (with Nina Dobrev)	The Vampire Diaries	Won	
2015	Teen Choice Awards	Choice TV Actor Fantasy/Sci-Fi	The Vampire Diaries	Nominated	
2015	Teen Choice Awards	Choice TV: Chemistry (with Kat Graham)	The Vampire Diaries	Nominated	
2015	Teen Choice Awards	Choice TV: Liplock (with Nina Dobrev)	The Vampire Diaries	Won	
2015	mtvU Fandom Awards	Ship of the Year (with Kat Graham)	The Vampire Diaries	Nominated	
2016	People's Choice Awards	Favorite Sci-Fi/Fantasy TV Actor	The Vampire Diaries	Nominated	
2016	Teen Choice Awards	Choice TV Actor Fantasy/Sci-Fi	The Vampire Diaries	Nominated	
2016	Teen Choice Awards	Choice TV: Chemistry (with Kat Graham)	The Vampire Diaries	Nominated	
2017	People's Choice Awards	Favorite Sci-Fi/Fantasy TV Actor	The Vampire Diaries	Nominated	
2017	Teen Choice Awards	Choice TV Actor Fantasy/Sci-Fi	The Vampire Diaries	Nominated	
2017	Teen Choice Awards	Choice Changemaker	—N/a	Nominated	
