= Neill Corporation =

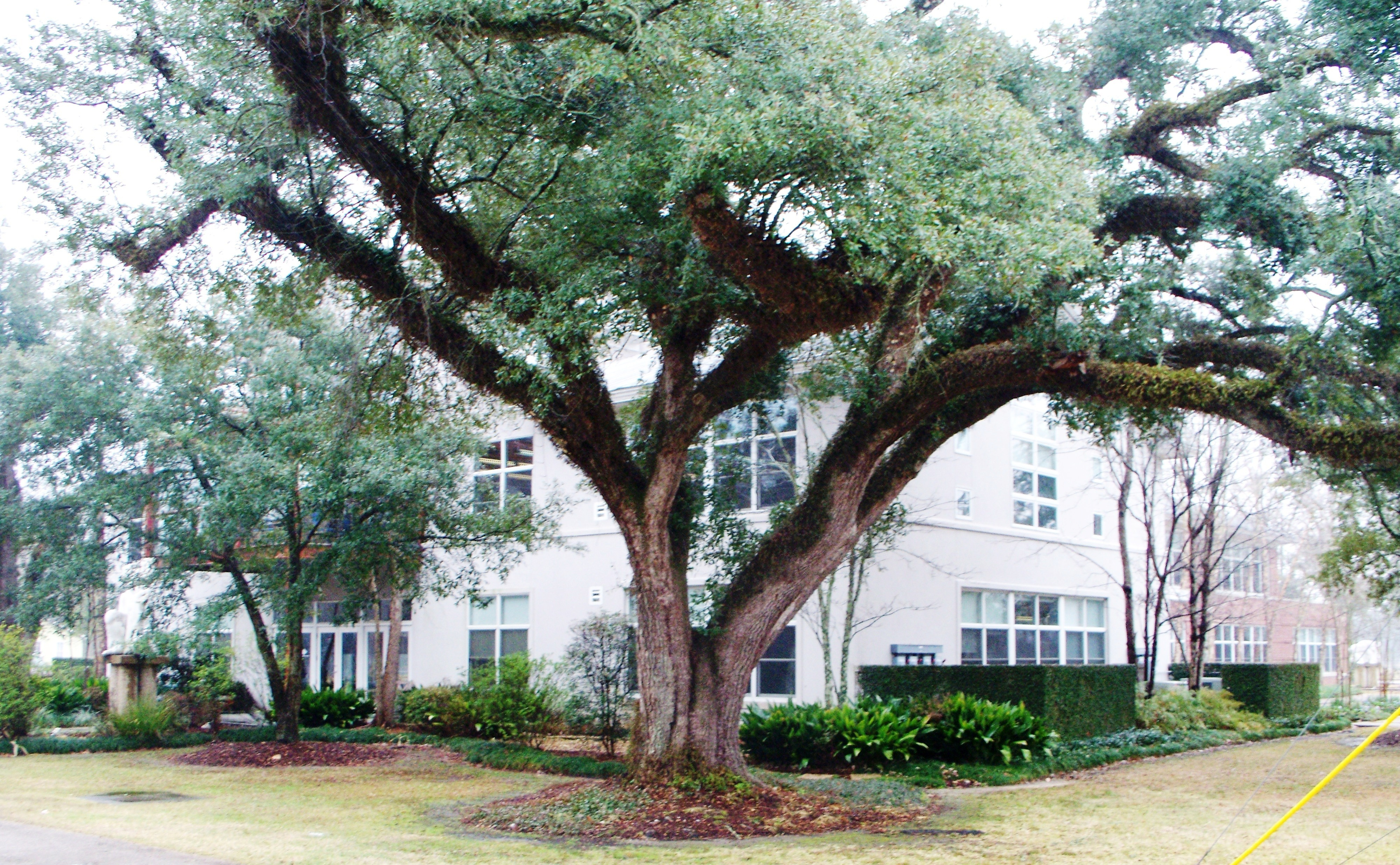
Neill Corporation's headquarters offers employees a lush garden environment.

Neill Corporation is an international corporation based in Hammond, Louisiana.

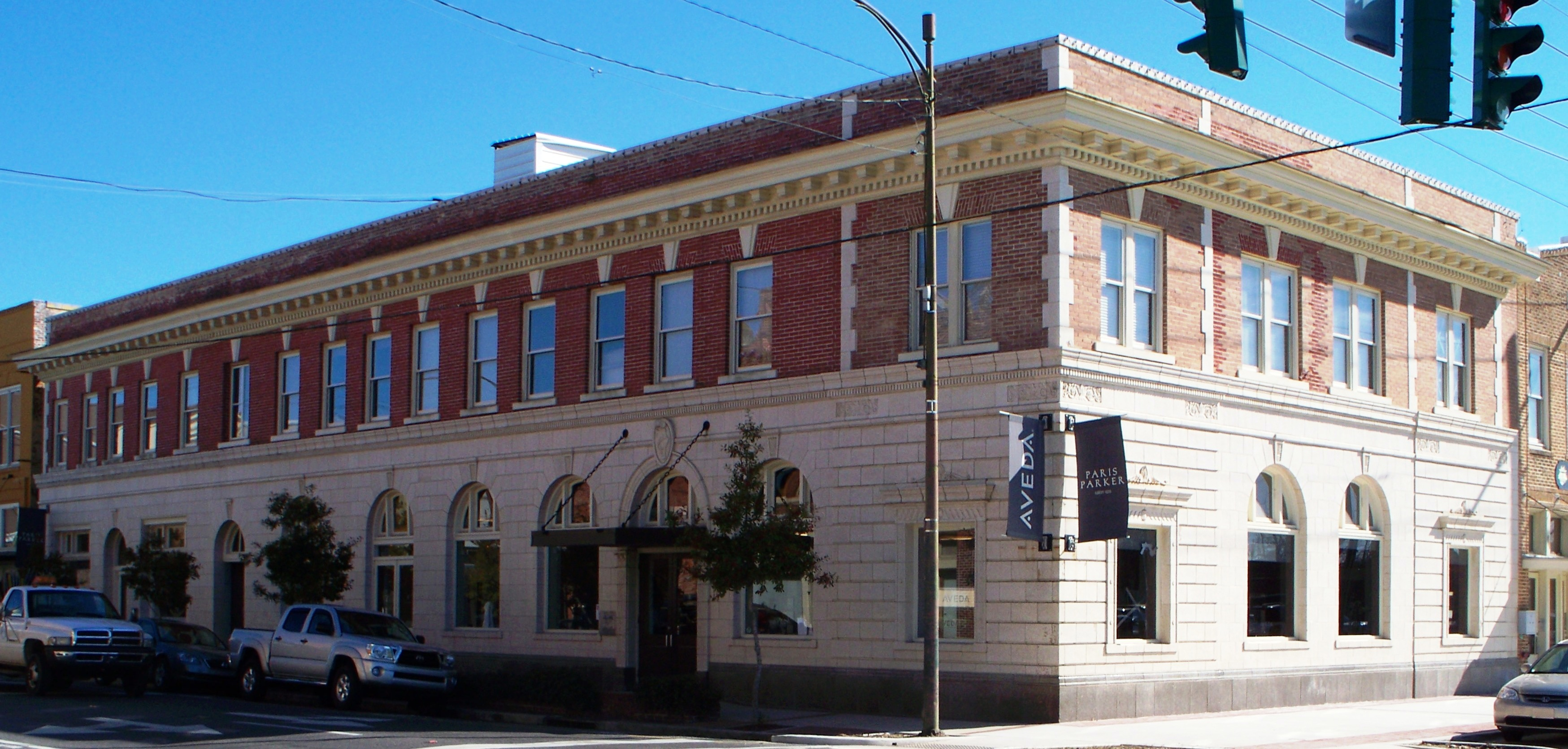
Paris Parker Aveda salon in the historic Guaranty Bank Building.

It dates back to 1932 when Abner Neill began developing experience in the cosmetics business. In 1944 Abner Neill started Magnolia Beauty Supply in Shreveport, Louisiana. Joined by Abner's son Edwin Neill II (1940-2004), the company became Neill Corporation in the 1970s.

Neill Corporation is the supplier of Paris Parker beauty salons and is allied with Aveda Institutes & Beauty Basics.

The CEO of Neill Corporation is Edwin's widow, Debra Neill Baker. She chose the theme "Expose Yourself" in her address to the graduating class at Southeastern Louisiana University's 2009 December 12 commencement exercises.
