= St. Scholastica Academy (Covington, Louisiana) =

Location
- 122 South Massachusetts Street; Covington, (St. Tammany Parish), Louisiana 70433; United States; 30°28′25″N 90°5′52″W

Information
- Type: Private, All-Girls High School
- Religious affiliations: Roman Catholic (Benedictine Sisters)
- Established: 1903; 123 years ago
- Sister school: St. Paul's School
- Dean: Jennifer Grimley (academics); Carol Ann Dufrene (students)
- Head of school: Sheri H. Gillio
- Teaching staff: 40.5 (on an FTE basis) (2021–22)
- Grades: 8–12
- Gender: Female
- Age range: 13-18
- Enrollment: 539 (2021–22)
- Student to teacher ratio: 13.3 (2021–22)
- Language: English
- Hours in school day: 7
- Colors: Royal blue and white
- Slogan: Giving Young Women Wings
- Sports: Basketball, Softball, Volleyball, Cross Country, Swimming, Bowling, Golf, Indoor Track, Soccer, Lacrosse, Tennis, Outdoor Track, SSA Royalettes (8-9 grade), SPS Golden Blues (10-12), SSA Cheerleading (8-10 grade), SPS Cheerleading (10-12)
- Mascot: White-winged dove
- Team name: Doves
- Accreditation: Southern Association of Colleges and Schools
- Publication: Osirian (literary magazine)
- Yearbook: The Dove
- School fees: $800 (2023-24)
- Tuition: $11,125 (2023-24)
- Associate Head of School: Eileen Depreo
- Website: www.ssacad.org

St. Scholastica Academy (SSA) is a private, Roman Catholic, all-girls high school in Covington, Louisiana. It is located in the Roman Catholic Archdiocese of New Orleans.

== Background ==
The SSA was established in 1903 by the Benedictine Sisters. St. Scholastica was St. Benedict's twin sister. St Scholastica's foundation is based on four pillars. These four pillars are located in front of the school's entrance. SSA offers Honors, Advanced Placement, and Dual Enrollment courses.

== History ==
In 1902 ground was broken in the building of a new school, St. Scholastica Academy. September 4, 1903, the large bell suspended above the new wooden four-story building rang for the first time. In 2016, Benedictine Hall was transformed into a STEM Building, to configure new science and math classrooms. In August 2019, Angelus Hall, a STEM classroom building holding a Mac Lab, TV Production Studio, 7 classrooms for Math & Theology departments, and 1 science lab was completed. Angelus Hall is connected to Benedictine Hall; the construction of Angelus Hall also came with the 10s, 20s, and 30s classroom buildings being demolished as they were outdated and no longer met students' needs.

== Athletics ==
St. Scholastica Academy athletics competes in the LHSAA.

== Associated schools ==
- St. Paul's School
