= St. Paul's School (Louisiana) =

Catholic Lasallian boys' school in Louisiana, USA

Saint Paul's School
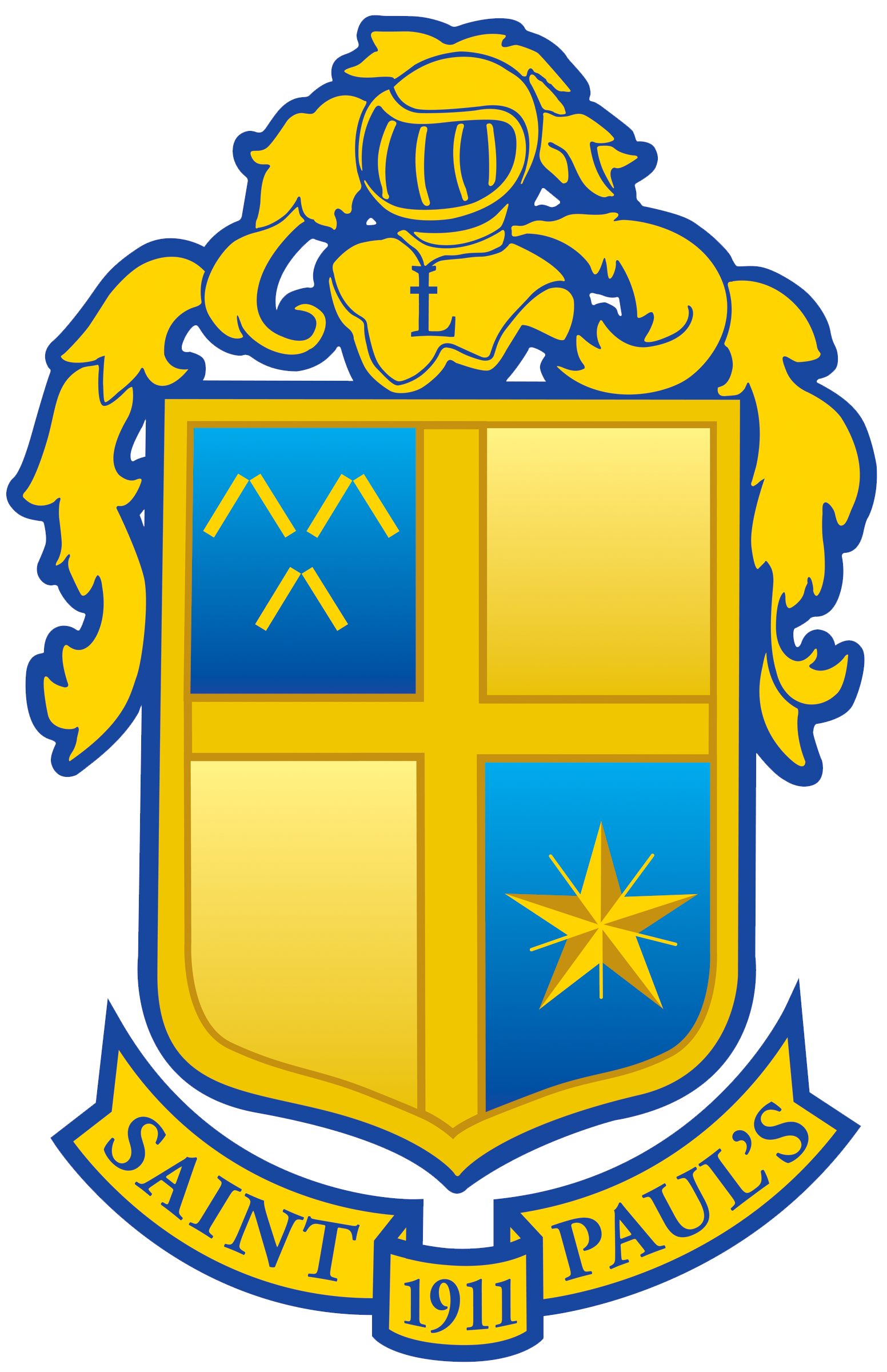
- School crest

Location
- 917 South Jahncke Avenue; Covington, Louisiana 70433; United States; 30°28′4.26″N 90°6′19.19″W

Information
- Type: Private
- Motto: Rise Up, O Men of God
- Religious affiliation: Catholic
- Patron saint: Saint Paul
- Established: 1911; 115 years ago
- Founder: Benedictines of Saint Joseph Abbey
- Sister school: St. Scholastica Academy
- Oversight: Archdiocese of New Orleans
- School code: 190-590
- President: Joe Dickens
- Dean: Mick Nunez
- Principal: Lee Pierre
- Grades: 8–12
- Gender: All-Boys
- Enrollment: 909 (2025)
- Hours in school day: 8:00-3:00
- Colors: Royal blue and Gold
- Slogan: "The Strength of The Wolf is The Pack."
- Athletics conference: LHSAA 5A
- Mascot: Wolf
- Nickname: Wolves
- Accreditation: Southern Association of Colleges and Schools
- Publication: Wolftracks
- Newspaper: The Paper Wolf
- Yearbook: The Conifer
- Tuition: $11,925 (2025-26)
- Alumni: Saint Paul’s School Alumni Association
- Website: www.stpauls.com

Saint Paul's School is a private all-boys Lasallian high school, located in Covington, Louisiana, just to the north of New Orleans. Located in the Archdiocese of New Orleans, the school is run by the Christian Brothers and is one of over 1,000 Lasallian schools in more than 80 countries. It is part of 300+ years of history originating from the founding of the Christian Brother Schools by Jean-Baptiste de La Salle. In 2015 and again in 2021, the United States Department of Education recognized Saint Paul's School as a National Blue Ribbon School of Excellence.

== History ==
In 1904, a group of residents of the Covington area banded together to fund the building of a new public school. After acquiring a tract of land and building a one-story, 2 bedroom building, the school, called Dixon Academy, opened in 1907. The school failed to attract enough students to remain viable.

In 1911, the school property was sold to the Benedictines of nearby Saint Joseph Abbey. The school was renamed Saint Paul's, and reopened in September, 1911, with only 48 students. By the end of the first session, enrollment numbered 70 boarders and 30 day students.

Meanwhile, nineteen French Christian Brothers had emigrated to Louisiana from France and Mexico, having been exiled for political reasons and purchased the school from the Benedictines.

Although Saint Paul's originally taught students only at high school level, it grew to encompass middle and elementary levels; this continued into the 1950s. However, by the 1960s there were enough other schools in the area to allow Saint Paul's to begin to eliminate the younger grades, with the intention of focusing on a college preparatory curriculum. By the late 1970s, the school had a six-year program, 7th-12th grades. The 1981-82 year was the final session with a 7th grade class, and the school continues a five-year program to this day.

The original Dixon Academy building (known as Dixon Hall on campus) had long been supplanted by other buildings, but remained standing and used for storage. In November 1981, during Thanksgiving break, the building burned to the ground; a forensic investigation determined old electrical wiring to be the cause. Using bricks from the original structure, a patio/garden area was created on the site, and dubbed "Founders' Circle".

The last of the original 19 brothers, Bro. Charles Crouzet, remained living on campus, although retired from teaching, until his death in 1985. A statue of Jesus was erected in Founders' Circle and dedicated to Bro. Charles in honor of his faithful devotion to the school and God.

As a boarding school, Saint Paul's was able to accommodate students from a wide geographic area; over the years, students from Central and South America, France, Greece, Russia, Korea, and Japan attended. However, due to a general decline in boarders, the increasing expense of housing residents, and the prospect of overhauling a dormitory which was in disrepair, Saint Paul's converted to an all day-student program beginning with the 2003–2004 school year.

In 2011, Saint Paul's celebrated its centennial birthday.

The Lasalle Hall dormitory was originally built as a two-wing building in 1964, with a third central wing added in 1970. In 2010–2011, the center wing (which had deteriorated beyond repair) was removed, and the remaining space underwent a full renovation and conversion into classroom space as the new Math and Science building. In the central courtyard, a set of pillars was added with plaques for each of the Lasallian Core Principles. The first day of classes in the renovated space was January 9, 2012.

During the 2014–2015 school year, Saint Paul's started construction on a new gymnasium for the Gene Bennet Sports Complex. The new gymnasium was completed and dedicated in September 2015. The new gymnasium is the primary home for basketball and physical education programs, while wrestling and powerlifting is housed in a renovated Gene Bennett Sports Complex.

During summer 2018 to fall 2018, Benilde Hall was renovated. Saint Paul's removed the second floor library and the ground floor was made into a student commons area and coffee shop.

=== Activities and Clubs ===
- Bowling
- Computer Club
- Drama (Marian Players)
- Environmental Science Club
- Guerrilla Wolves Video Club
- Habitat Club
- HOSA
- Key Club
- Lasallian Youth Leaders
- Marching Band (Marching Wolves)
- Mu Alpha Theta
- National Junior Honor Society
- National Honor Society
- Quiz Bowl
- School Newspaper (The Paper Wolf)
- Spanish Club
- Shell Eco Car
- Student Council
- Student Ambassadors
- Ultimate Frisbee Club
- Yearbook (The Conifer)

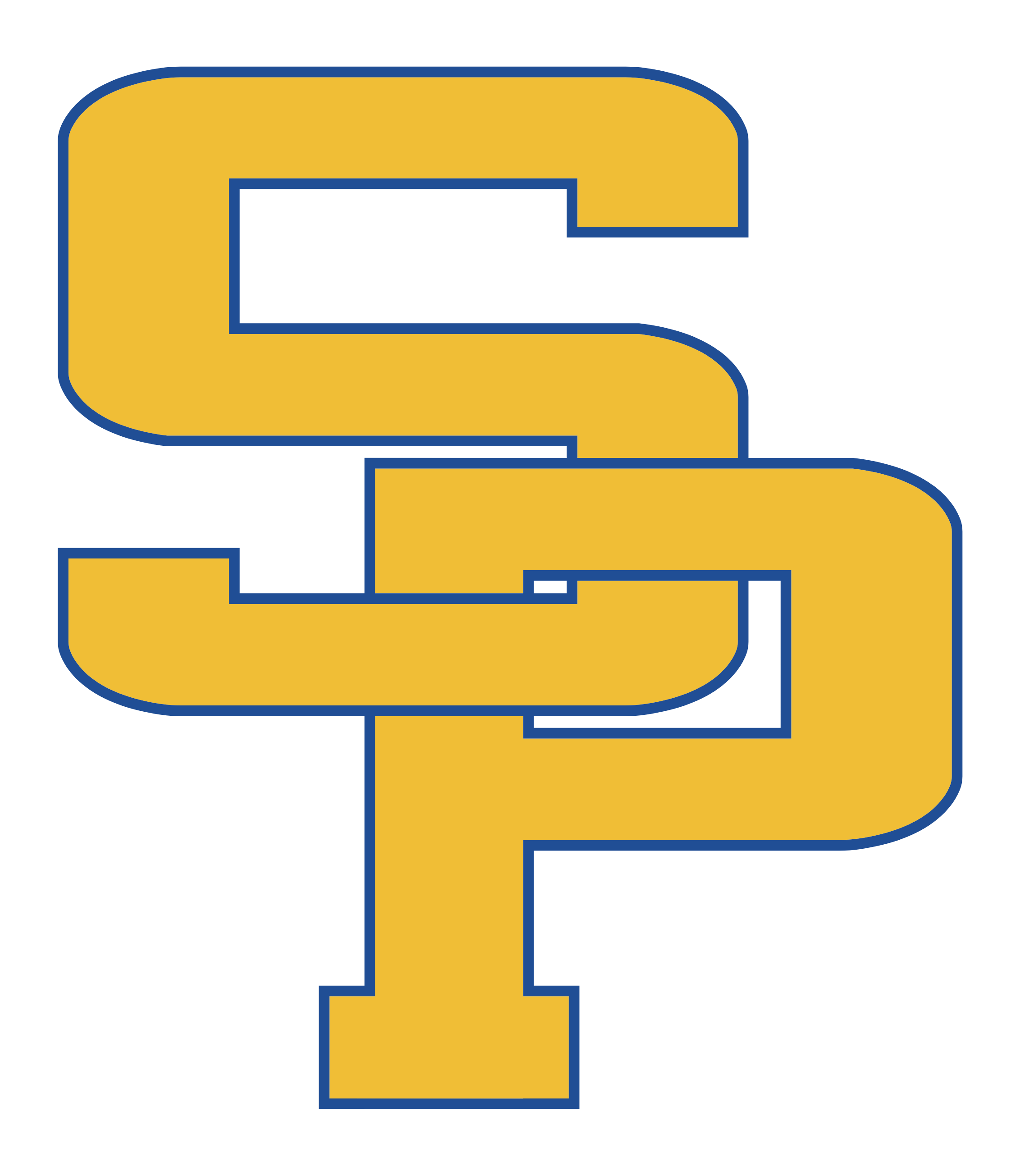
Interlinked S and P lettermark for Saint Paul's School.

== Athletics ==
St. Paul's School athletics competes in the LHSAA.

The school offers the following sports programs:

- Baseball
- Basketball
- Bowling
- Cross Country
- Football
- Golf
- Lacrosse
- Powerlifting
- Rugby
- Soccer
- Swimming
- Tennis
- Track and Field
- Ultimate Frisbee
- Wrestling

=== Championships ===
Baseball Championships

- (2) State: 1999, 2019

Cross Country Championships

- (6) State: 1997, 1998, 1999, 2000, 2013, 2016

The team won six state championships, four consecutively in ‘97, '98, '99, '00, and two more in '13 and '16. In 2011 the team placed 3rd in the LHSAA state championships and in 2012 were the state runners-up.

In 2017, Eric Coston set the Louisiana high school 3-mile record time at 14:25.7

Football Championships

- (11) District: 1990, 2005, 2006, 2007, 2009, 2010, 2011, 2012, 2013, 2015, 2016

Lacrosse Championships

- (1) State: 2017

Powerlifting Championships

- (3) State: 2012, 2021, 2023

Soccer Championships

- (11) State: 2025, 2023, 2020, 2019, 2017, 2016, 2015, 2014, 2011, 1998, 1997
- (4) State Runner-Up: 2021, 2018, 2013, 2012

Tennis Championships

- (1) State: 1991 (First state championship in school history)

Track and Field Championships

- (1) District: 2012

Wrestling Division II Team Championships

- (1) State: 2000

== Buildings ==
- Administration Building
- Office of Institutional Advancement
- Alumni Memorial Theater
- Band Hall
- Benilde Hall
- Briggs Assembly Center: used for campus ministry, graduation performances, fund raisers, school functions.
- Brother's Residence
- Dining Hall
- Our Lady of Peace Chapel
- The Gene Bennett Sports Complex
- Hunter Stadium
- La Salle Hall: originally used as a dormitory building, but after major renovations in 2011, the building now features over 30,000 square feet of academic space.
- Main School Building
- Maintenance Building
- Gymnasium
- Wolf Dome

== Brother Raymond Bulliard, FSC ==
Brother Raymond Bulliard, referred to by students as "Brother Ray," was the 17th Christian Brother President of St. Paul's School and is given credit for the school's success. In addition to serving the school as its president, Brother Ray also was regarded as one of the greatest principals and English teachers in the school's 111-year history. He was known for his special gift for remembering the names and interests of every student at the school. He died on April 23, 2023, after being diagnosed with cancer.

== Notable alumni ==
- Kade Anderson, baseball player
- Houston Bates, American football player
- Andy Cannizaro, baseball player
- Khaled Mattawa, poet, translator, Chancellor of the Academy of American Poets, teacher at the University of Michigan, Ann Arbor.
- Tanner Rainey, baseball player
- Ryan Schimpf, baseball player
- Nilo Silvan, American football player
- Ian Somerhalder, actor and model

== Associated schools ==
- St. Scholastica Academy (Covington, Louisiana)
