= Bogue Falaya =

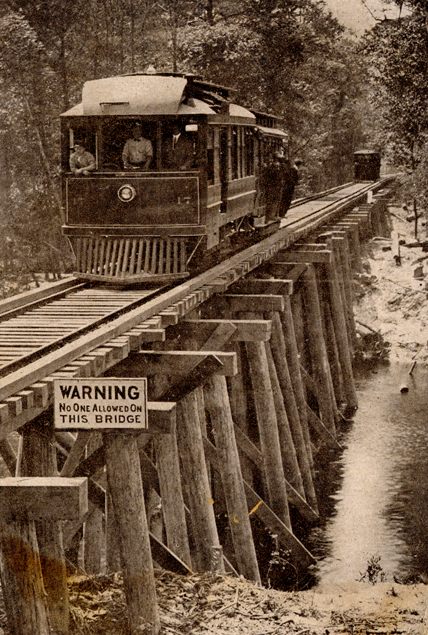
- Wooden bridge crossing the Bogue Falaya River near Covington, Louisiana, 1910s.
- Bogue Falaya

Location
- Country: United States
- State: Louisiana
- Parishes: Washington; St. Tammany

Physical characteristics
- Source
  - location: Washington Parish, Louisiana
  - coordinates: 30°42′11″N 90°09′55″W
- Mouth: Tchefuncte River
  - location: Covington, St. Tammany Parish, Louisiana
  - coordinates: 30°26′23″N 90°06′59″W
- Length: 28 mi (45 km)

Basin features
- Cities: Covington
- Tributaries
  - left: Abita River

The Bogue Falaya, also known as the Bogue Falaya River, is a 28-mile-long (45 km) river in southeastern Louisiana in the United States. It is a tributary of the Tchefuncte River, which flows to Lake Pontchartrain. The river flows through an area of mixed pine-hardwood and bottomland hardwood forests on the Gulf Coastal Plain.

The Bogue Falaya rises in southwestern Washington Parish and flows generally south-southeastwardly through western St. Tammany Parish, past Covington, where it collects the Abita River. It joins the Tchefuncte River about 10 miles (16 km) upstream of that river's mouth at Lake Pontchartrain.

The name is derived from the Choctaw words bogu, “river,” and falaya, "long."

A portion of the Bogue Falaya in St. Tammany Parish has been designated a "Natural and Scenic River" by the state government of Louisiana.

== Variant names and spellings ==
According to the Geographic Names Information System, the Bogue Falaya has also been known historically as:

- Bogue Falaia
- Bogue Falaya River
- Bogue Falia
- Bogue Faliah
- Bogue Fallaya
- Bogue Faylia
- Bogue Phalia
- Bouge Filia
- Bouge Filiah
- Bougue Falaia
- Buck-Palaya Arroyo
- Long River

== See also ==
- List of Louisiana rivers
