= First Bank and Trust =

American bank

First Bank & Trust
- Industry: Finance and Insurance
- Founded: May 18, 1991; 35 years ago
- Defunct: March 1, 2022; 4 years ago
- Fate: Acquired by BankPlus
- Headquarters: New Orleans, Louisiana, USA
- Products: Credit cards, Loans, deposit products, insurance, investments, financial planning, trust, asset management, and cash management services.
- Revenue: ▲US$24.37 million (2021)
- Net income: ▲US$25.32 million (2021)
- Total assets: ▲US$1.27 billion (2021)
- Total equity: ▲US$0.12 billion (2021)
- Website: http://www.fbtonline.com/

First Bank and Trust, bank of First Trust Corporation, was a New Orleans–based independent bank, founded in 1991, with branch locations across the Gulf Coast.

The main office was located in Downtown New Orleans inside the First Bank and Trust Tower

First Bank and Trust has branches located in Louisiana in New Orleans, Metairie, Algiers, Kenner, Harahan, Covington, Harvey, Baton Rouge, Amite, Greensburg, Hammond, and Lafayette. Additionally, First Bank and Trust serves Mississippi with branches in Biloxi and Gulftport. Home mortgage offices (FBT Mortgage, LLC), covering southeast Louisiana, are also located in branch offices.

First Bank and Trust's parent company, First Trust Corporation, also holds affiliated subsidiaries FBT Investments, FBT Advisors and First Insurance Agency.

First Bank and Trust was a state chartered and Federal Deposit Insurance Corporation-insured with approximately $1 billion in assets as of March 30, 2020.

First Trust Corporation was acquired by BancPlus Corporation, parent company of BankPlus, on March 1, 2022.

== Company logo ==
The company's logo is based on the Delta symbol that represented "change" and "strength" during ancient times. In New Orleans, the shape symbolizes the Mississippi River delta region that the bank serves.
