= Bevolo Gas and Electric Lights =

American Light fixture company

Bevolo Gas & Electric Lights
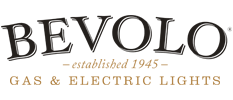
- Industry: Light fixture
- Founded: 1945 by Andrew Bevolo, Sr.
- Headquarters: New Orleans, Louisiana, United States
- Area served: Worldwide
- Products: Light fixtures
- Website: www.bevolo.com

Bevolo Gas and Electric Lights is the oldest and largest manufacturer of handmade, hand-riveted copper lanterns in the United States.

Andrew Bevolo, Sr. in 1945 founded Bevolo and remains a family business, currently operated by Andrew Bevolo, III. Andrew Bevolo, Sr. founded the company with experience working for Ford, Igor Sikorsky and Andrew Higgins. The company revolutionized gas lighting by utilizing hand-riveting, which is a technique superior to soldering that guarantees the lantern's continuous pristine condition. As a result, their lights are featured prominently in the New Orleans French Quarter and on the mansions in the historic Garden District.

== History ==
In the 20th century, A. Hays Town worked with Andrew Bevolo, Sr. to produce the trademark French Quarter Lamp. After Hurricane Katrina, Bevolo opened a manufacturing location in Covington, Louisiana, and a retail location in Mandeville. In 2009, Bevolo opened another retail location on the famous Royal Street in the French Quarter. In addition to showcasing the historic gas and electric lanterns, the retail locations sell antiques and other products manufactured by the company, including interior lighting and furniture.

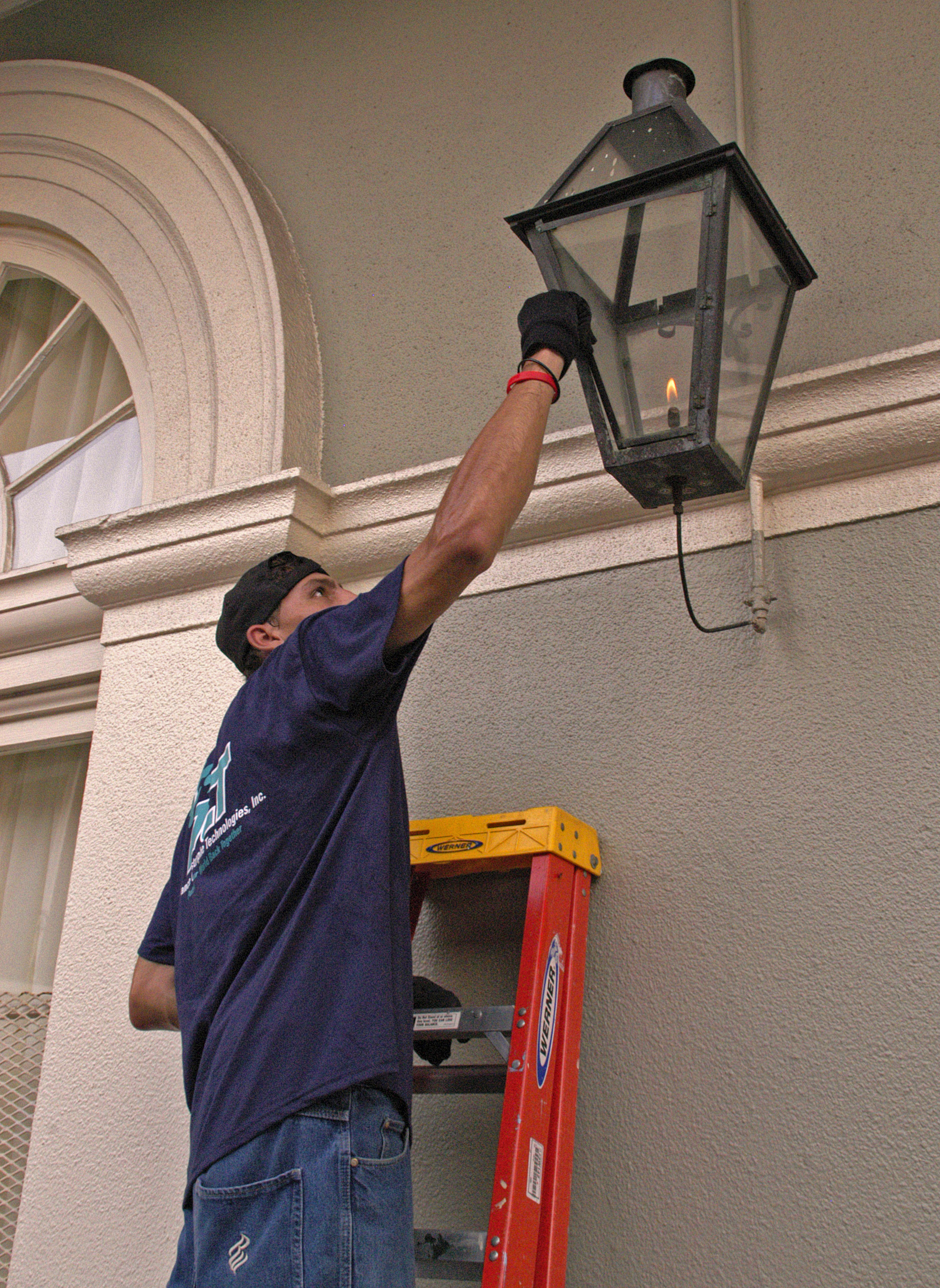
Historic gas lamp at Bourbon Orleans Hotel

The company caters to high income customers and has a wide variety of restaurant, commercial, residential clients. Bevolo products appear frequently on television and in movies.

== Product ==
All Bevolo gas and electric lights are manufactured in the New Orleans area and fabricated by hand using antiqued copper. Bevolo offers complementary design services to ensure lighting is the correct size and architecturally appropriate. The company has over 500 light and bracket combinations variations and offers custom made lighting. Bevolo lighting is ETL (Edison Testing Laboratories) approved.
