= Pushepatapa Creek =

Stream in Louisiana, U.S.

Coordinates: 30.80833°N 89.82296°W

Pushepatapa Creek is a stream in the U.S. state of Louisiana.

Pushepatapa is a name most likely derived from the Choctaw language; it's purported to mean "sandy bottom". Variant names are "Poosheepatapa Creek", "Poosheepatopa Creek", "Pushapatappa Creek", "Pushepetapa Creek", "Pushepetappy Creek", and "Pushpetappy Creek".
