= Tchefuncte River =

River in Louisiana

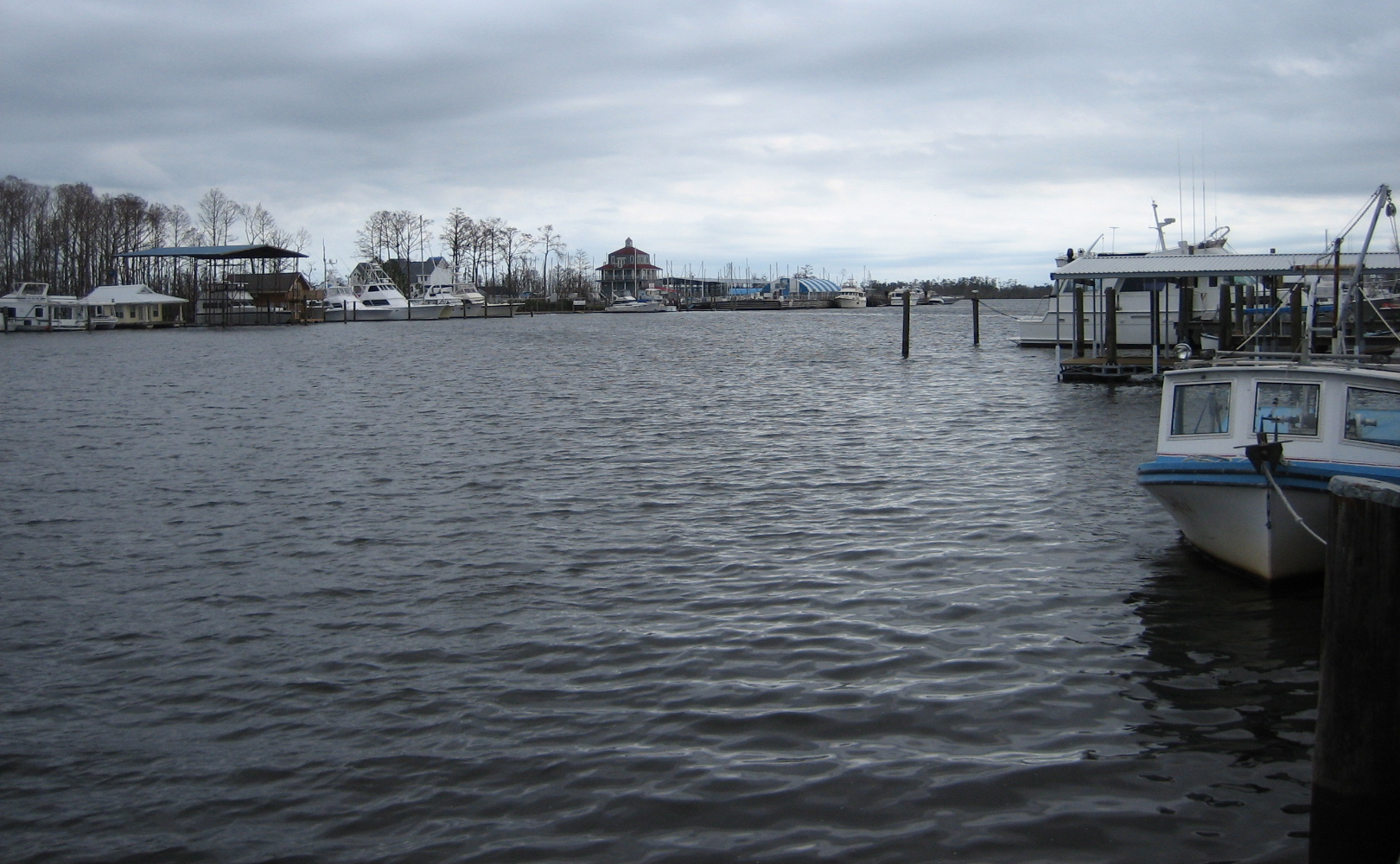
- Tchefuncte River as seen at Madisonville
- Tchefuncte River

Location
- Country: United States
- State: Louisiana
- Parishes: Washington; Tangipahoa; St. Tammany

Physical characteristics
- Source
  - location: Tangipahoa Parish, Louisiana
  - coordinates: 30°54′22″N 90°20′59″W
- Mouth: Lake Pontchartrain
  - location: Madisonville, St. Tammany Parish, Louisiana
  - coordinates: 30°22′36″N 90°09′38″W
- Length: 70 mi (110 km)

Basin features
- Cities: Covington; Madisonville
- Tributaries
  - left: Bogue Falaya
- GNIS number: 1628339

The Tchefuncte River (/tʃəˈfʌŋktə/ chə-FUNK-tə) drains into Lake Pontchartrain in Louisiana in the United States. It is about 70.0 miles (112.7 km) long.

== Etymology ==
The name Tchefuncte is believed to derive from the word Hachofakti, which is the Choctaw word for the American chinquapin, a species of chestnut, which was used by Native Americans to relieve headaches and fevers.

== Tchefuncte culture ==
The area around the river was inhabited by the hunter-gatherer Tchefuncte culture dating back to 600 BCE. The Native Americans gathered freshwater clams, fish, and crawfish, and built shell middens on the river. Their houses were probably temporary circular shelters having a frame of light poles covered with palmetto, thatch, or grass mixed with mud.

== Tchefuncte shipyard ==
During the War of 1812, Secretary of the Navy William Jones ordered Captain John Shaw to supervise the construction of a shallow-draft blockship armed with 32 heavy cannons at the shipyard in Madisonville, Louisiana. On December 16, 1814 Major General Andrew Jackson wrote a letter to Secretary of War John Armstrong Jr. demanding that the ship be completed. When the Battle of New Orleans began, the vessel was still moored at the Madisonville Naval Shipyard unfinished.

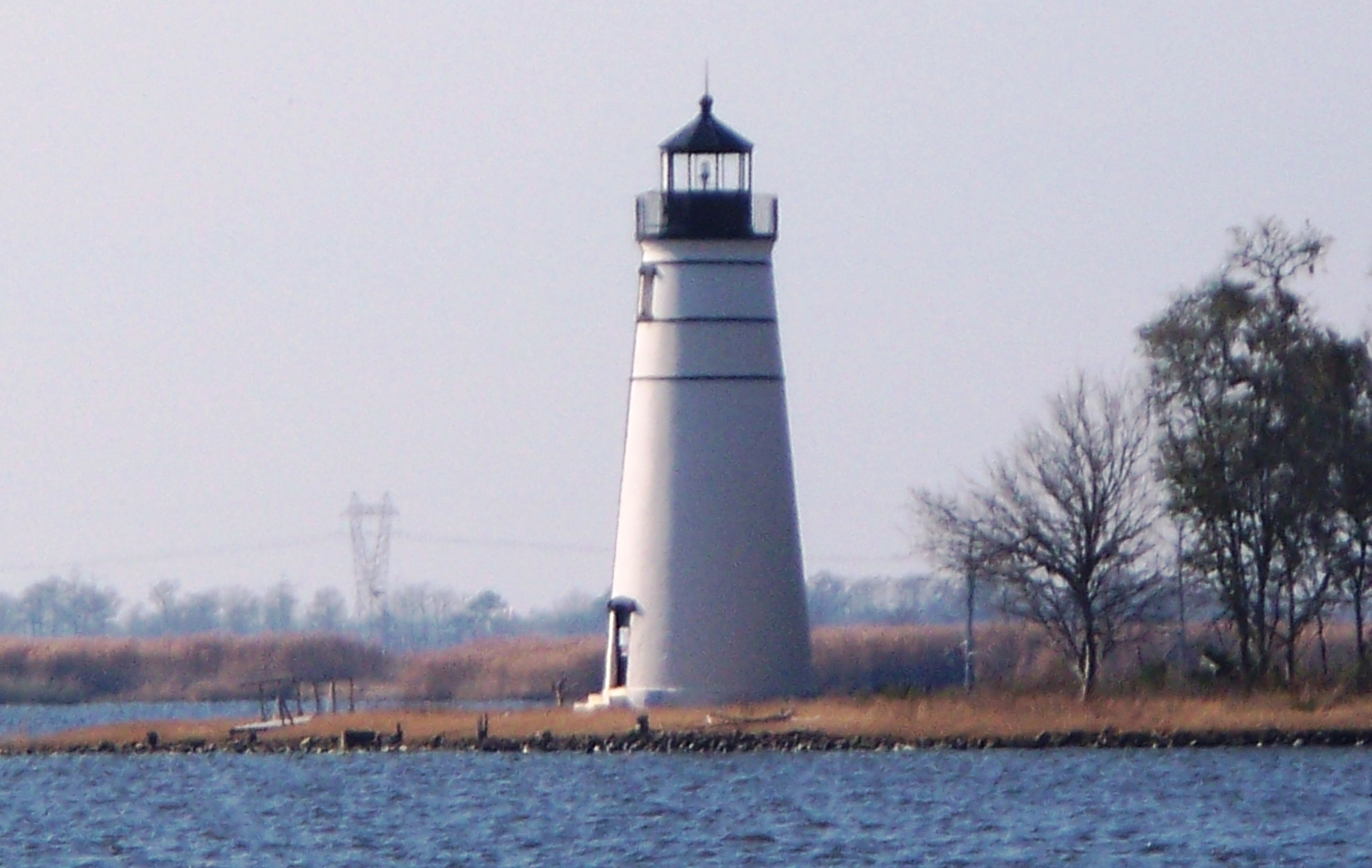
Madisonville's Tchefuncte River Lighthouse stands resolutely on the Saint Tammany north shore of Lake Pontchartrain. This lighthouse was built in 1837.

== Lighthouse ==
In 1837, the Tchefuncte River Range Lights was built to guide vessels across Lake Pontchartrain to the mouth of the Tchefuncte River. The lighting apparatus was supplied by Winslow Lewis and consisted of nine lamps with several 14-inch reflectors. The lighthouse was damaged sometime during the Civil War and was repaired in 1867. The U.S. Coast Guard later took control over the lighthouse in 1939 and used an electrical automation system to power the lighthouse. Then in 1999, the local town of Madisonville assumed ownership and the Institute of Museum and Library Services issued a grant for restoring the historical property. The lighthouse is visible from Marina del Ray down to the parking area at the Madisonville Boat Launch. The lighthouse also survived Hurricane Katrina and Hurricane Rita, and continues to be an important historical location.

== Course ==
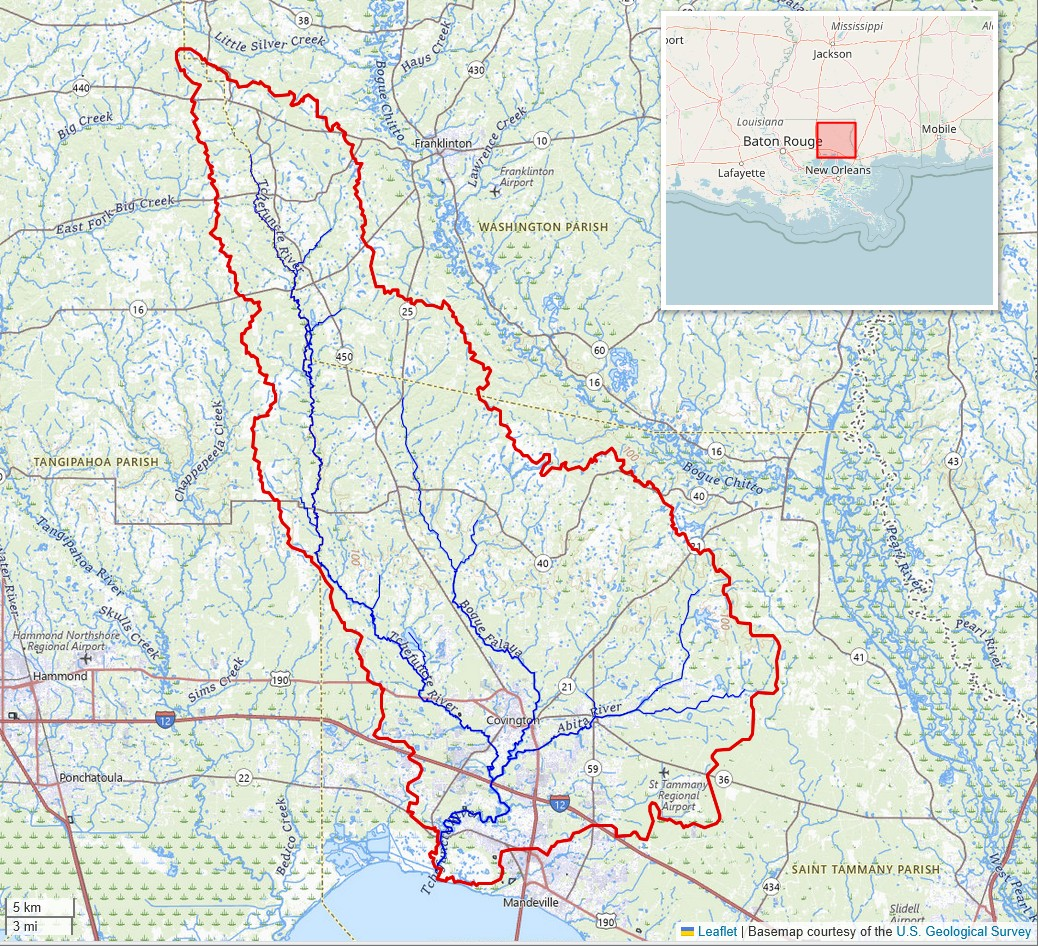
Tchefuncte River Watershed Map (Interactive map)

The Tchefuncte rises in northeastern Tangipahoa Parish and initially flows southward; the river is used to define part of the eastern boundary of Tangipahoa Parish and parts of the western boundaries of Washington and St. Tammany Parishes before turning southeastward into St. Tammany Parish, where it passes the city of Covington and the town of Madisonville. It collects its largest tributary, the Bogue Falaya, at Covington and flows into Lake Pontchartrain about 2 miles (3.2 km) south of Madisonville, near the lake's northern extremity.

== Today ==
In the 19th century, the Tchefuncte River was an important commercial waterway, where building materials and other products of the north shore of Lake Pontchartrain were loaded to be shipped across the Lake to New Orleans. Today, The Tchefuncte River, located in southeastern Louisiana, is known for its scenic beauty and serves as a popular spot for boating and recreational activities. The river's banks are home to several marinas, the largest in the area being Marina del Ray, a riverside park, yacht marinas, restaurants, coffee shops, and bars, and the Lake Pontchartrain Basin Maritime Museum.

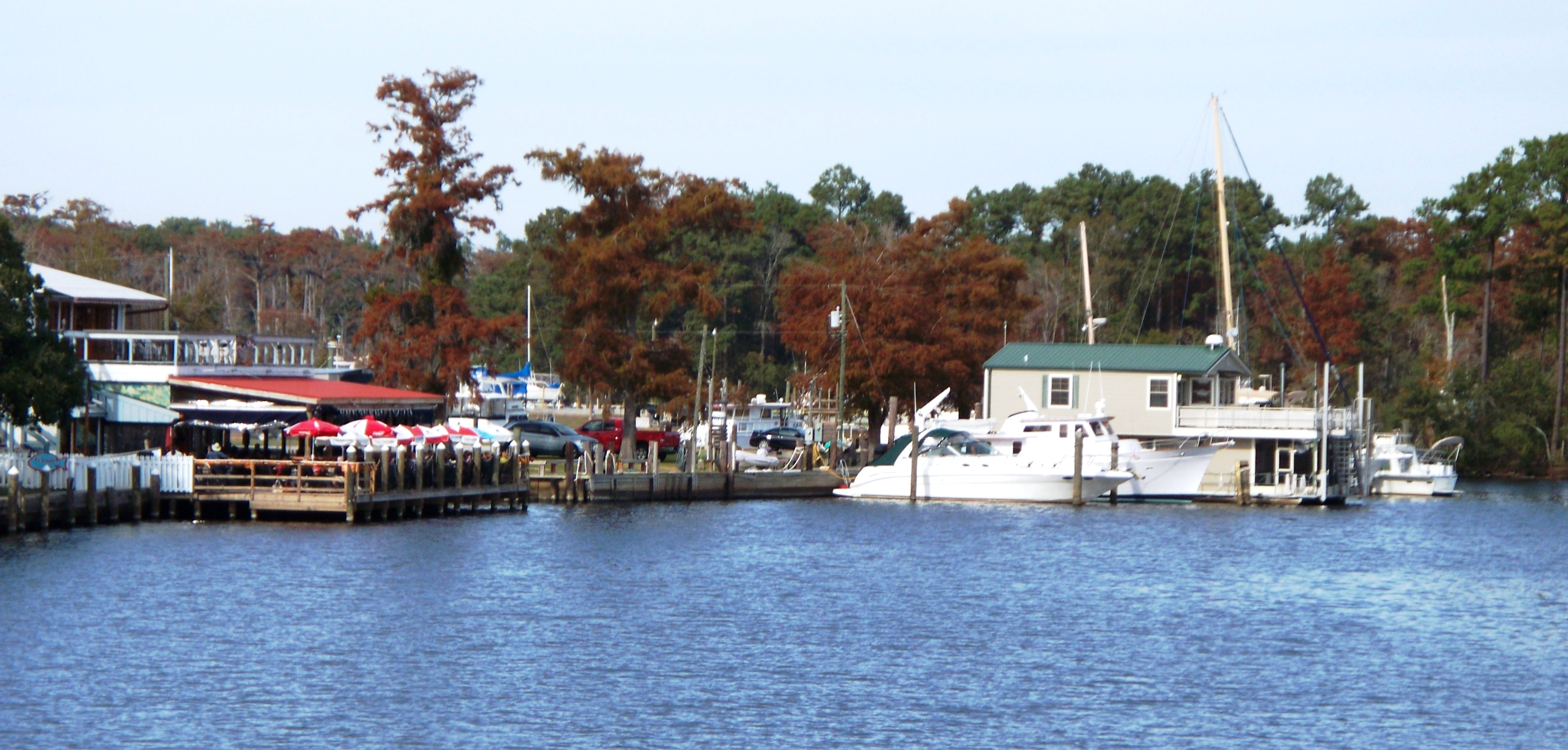
Madisonville's colorful waterfront, viewed here looking north from the drawbridge on LA 22, features outdoor dining along the Tchefuncte River estuary.

The Tchefuncte has been designated by the government of Louisiana as a "Natural and Scenic River". Fairview-Riverside State Park is located along the river, upstream of Madisonville.

== See also ==
- List of Louisiana rivers
