= First Guaranty Bank =

American bank based in Louisiana

First Guaranty Bancshares, Inc.
- Type: Public
- Traded as: Nasdaq: FGBI; Russell 2000 Index component
- Industry: Banking
- Founded: 1934; 92 years ago
- Headquarters: Hammond, Louisiana, US
- Area served: Louisiana
- Key people: Marshall T. Reynolds, (chairman); Alton B. Lewis (CEO & president); Eric J. Dosch (CFO)
- Total assets: ▲$1.750 billion (2017)
- Total equity: ▲$0.143 billion (2017)
- Number of employees: 349 (2017)
- Website: fgb.net

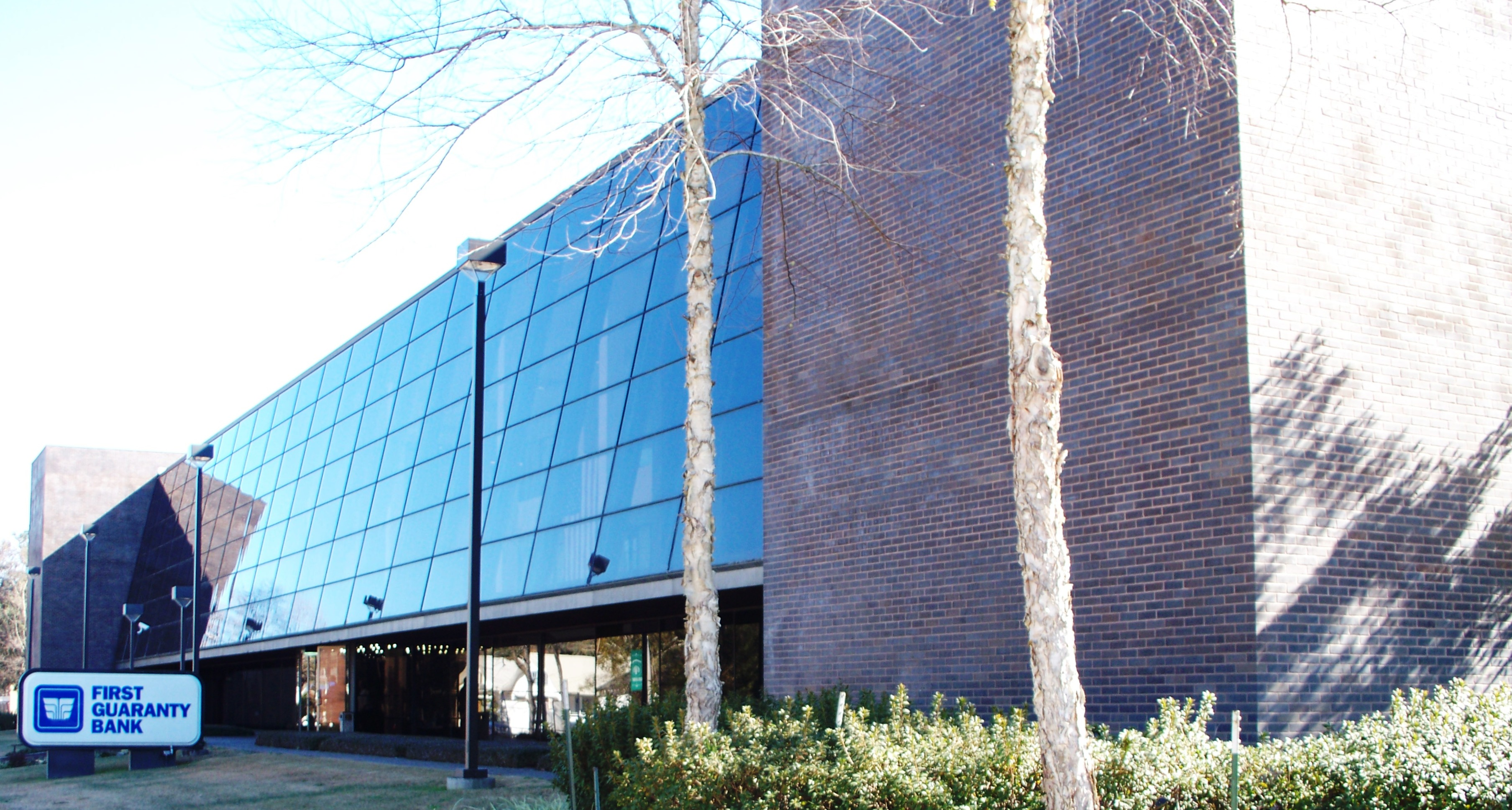
First Guaranty Bank's main office on East Thomas Street in Hammond, Louisiana, one block east of US 190's intersection with LA 1065.

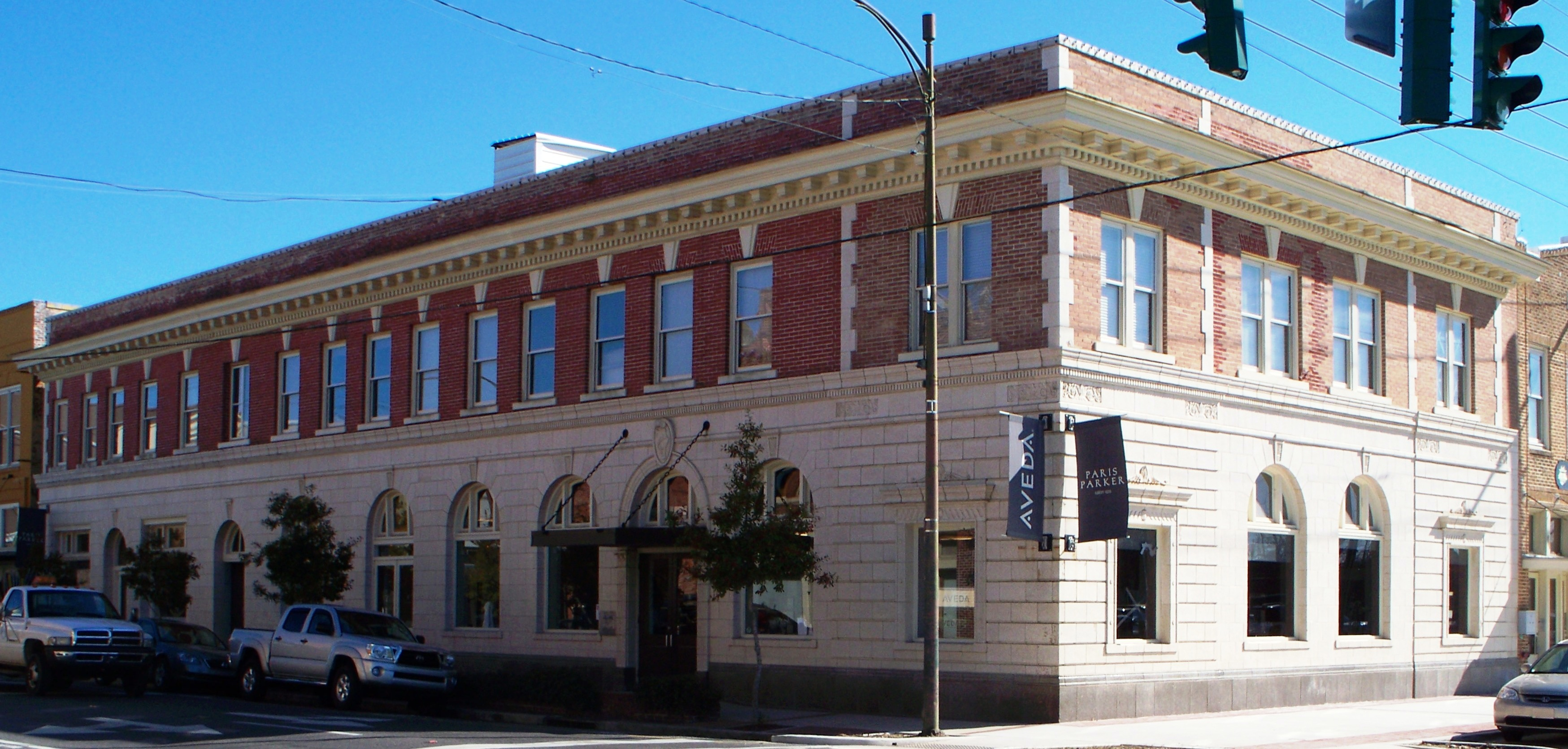
Former Guaranty Bank Building in Hammond's Historic District, now a Paris Parker Aveda Salon owned by Neill Corporation.

First Guaranty Bank (FGB) is a bank based in Hammond, Louisiana. It is the primary subsidiary of First Guaranty Bancshares, Inc., a bank holding company. The bank operates 21 branches.

== History ==
The bank was founded in Hammond, Louisiana in 1934 as Guaranty Bank & Trust Company.

In 1971, the bank was renamed First Guaranty Bank.

In 1999, the bank acquired 13 branches from Bank One.

In 2007, the company acquired Homestead Bancorp, Inc. for $13 million in cash. It also acquired Douglass National Bank of Kansas City.

On September 22, 2011, the bank exited its participation in the Troubled Asset Relief Program by repurchasing securities from the United States Treasury for $21.1 million.

In 2017, the company acquired Premier Bancshares for $21 million in cash and stock.

In August 2019, the bank's holding company entered into a deal to purchase the holding company of The Union Bank of Marksville, Louisiana for $43 million. When completed late in 2019, the acquisition will increase the bank's number of branches by about 50% to around 30.

== Allegation of racial discrimination ==
In 2019, Nikole Hannah-Jones, in a New York Times podcast, asserted that the bank discriminated against two African-American farmers, June and Angie Provost. According to the reporting, the bank is alleged to have engaged in fraud by changing loan amounts and forging the signatures of the applicants. This had the intended effect of putting financial pressure on the Provosts and eventually led them to lose their farm and their home to foreclosure. The case is now the subject of litigation and a federal USDA whistle-blower complaint. The bank denied these allegations, saying that they are "completely unfounded and frivolous", also stating that it "has not and does not engage in discriminatory practices".
