= Covington, Louisiana =

- City
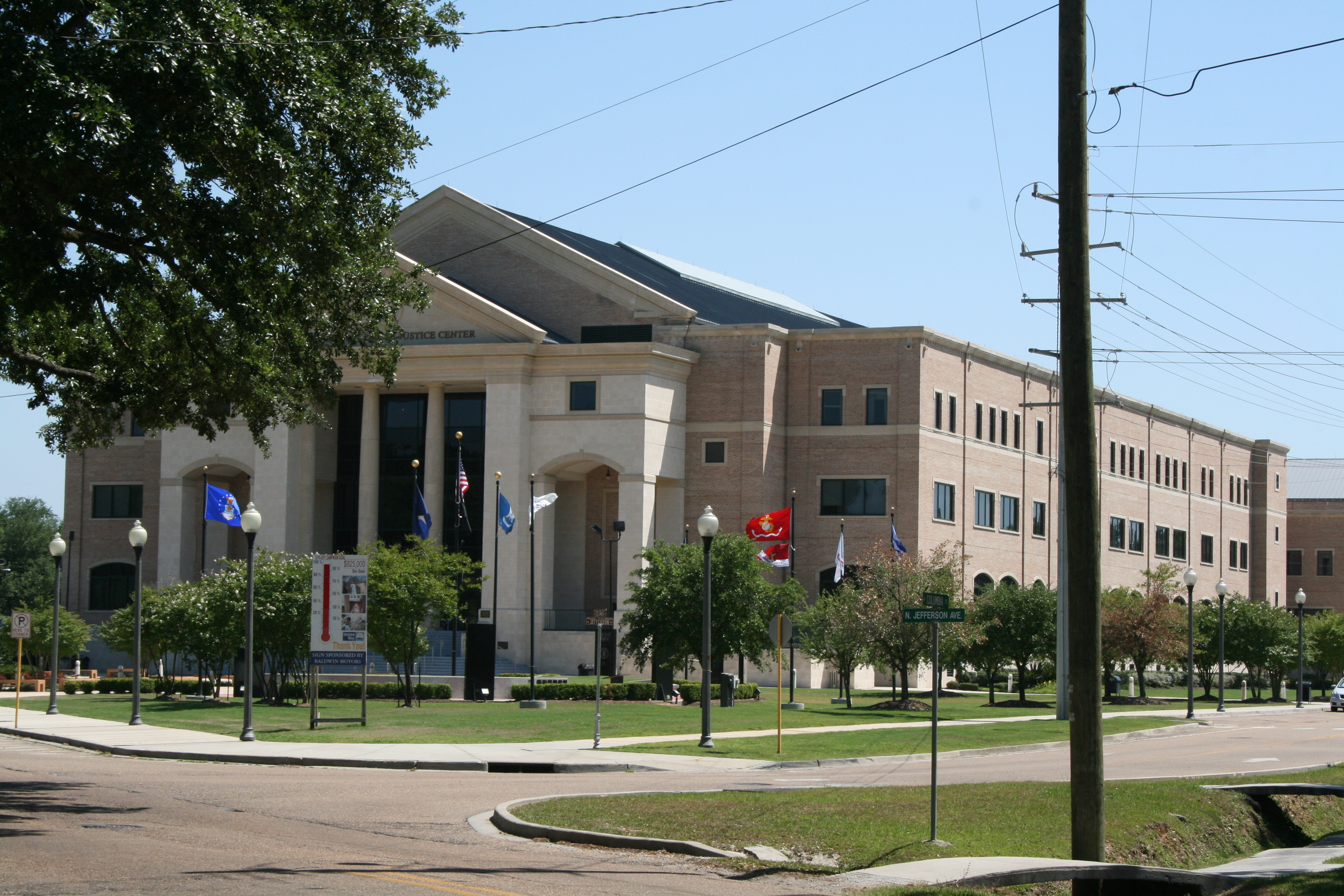
- St. Tammany Parish Offices

- Location of Covington in St. Tammany Parish, Louisiana.

- Location of Louisiana in the United States
- Coordinates: 30°28′44″N 90°06′15″W
- Country: United States
- State: Louisiana
- Parish: St. Tammany
- Founded: 1813
- Founder: John Wharton Collins
- Named for: Leonard Wailes Covington

Government
  - Mayor: Mark R. Johnson

Area
  - Total: 8.15 sq mi (21.12 km^{2})
  - Land: 8.02 sq mi (20.77 km^{2})
  - Water: 0.14 sq mi (0.35 km^{2})
- Elevation: 26 ft (7.9 m)

Population (2020)
  - Total: 11,564
  - Density: 1,441.9/sq mi (556.74/km^{2})
- Time zone: UTC-6 (CD T)
  - Summer (DST): UTC-5 (CDT)
- ZIP codes: 70433, 70434, 70435
- Area code: 985
- FIPS code: 22-18125
- Website: https://www.covla.com

Covington is a city in and the parish seat of St. Tammany Parish, Louisiana, United States. The population was 11,564 at the 2020 United States census. It is located at a fork of the Bogue Falaya and the Tchefuncte River. Covington is part of the Slidell-Mandeville-Covington statistical area.

== History ==
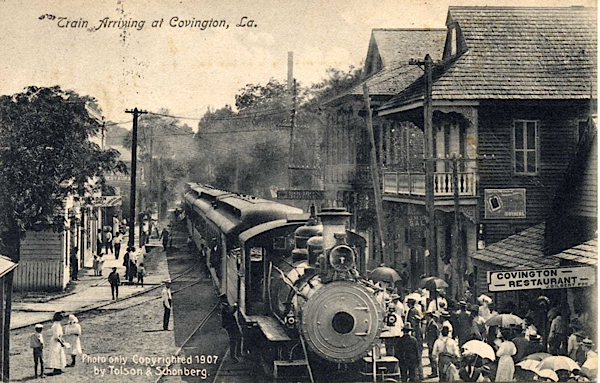
A train at Covington in 1907

The earliest known settlement by Europeans in the area was in 1800 by Jacques Drieux, during the British West Florida period.

In 1813, John Wharton Collins established a town with the name of Wharton. He is buried on the corner of the city cemetery directly across from the Covington Police Department. On March 11, 1816, the town of Wharton was renamed as Covington. There are conflicting stories about how the city came to be named Covington. Many historians believe the city was renamed for General Leonard Covington, a hero of the War of 1812. Covington was killed late in 1813, having established his home in the Mississippi Territory.

Local historian Judge Steve Ellis floats another theory centered on the suggestion by Jesse Jones, a local attorney, that the city be named in honor of the Blue Grass whiskey (made in Covington, Kentucky) enjoyed by town officials. In any case, Leonard Covington is the namesake of both towns.

Originally, commerce was brought to Covington via boat up the Bogue Falaya River, which used the Tchefuncte River as a means of passage to and from Lake Pontchartrain. Then in 1888, the railroad came to town. Much of the former railroad right-of-way is now occupied by the Tammany Trace, a 31-mile bike trail running east and west through several communities on the north side of Lake Pontchartrain.

In the late 20th century, with the expansion of Louisiana's road system, many people who worked in New Orleans moved to Covington, commuting to work via the Lake Pontchartrain Causeway. With the expansion of the interstate system, Covington experienced a boom of growth. Many people moved to the Northshore for more affordable housing, larger lot size, and a small-town feeling. This is considered to be associated with white flight out of New Orleans, though the Jefferson Parish area had the most expansion during that period.

== Geography ==
According to the United States Census Bureau, the city has a total area of 8.2 square miles (21.2 km^{2}), of which 0.23 square miles (0.6 km^{2}), or 2.60%, is covered by water. The city has many subdivisions. Notable ones include the communities of: West 30s, West 20s, Ozone, River Forest, Covington Point, Downtown Covington, and Barkley Parc.

== Demographics ==
Historical population
Census	Pop.	Note	%±
1870	585		—
1880	567		−3.1%
1890	976		72.1%
1900	1,205		23.5%
1910	2,601		115.9%
1920	2,942		13.1%
1930	3,208		9.0%
1940	4,123		28.5%
1950	5,113		24.0%
1960	6,754		32.1%
1970	7,170		6.2%
1980	7,892		10.1%
1990	7,691		−2.5%
2000	8,483		10.3%
2010	8,765		3.3%
2020	11,564		31.9%
2025 (est.)	11,721	▲	1.4%
U.S. Decennial Census

Covington racial composition as of 2020
Race	Number	Percentage
White (non-Hispanic)	8,208	70.98%
Black or African American (non-Hispanic)	1,941	16.78%
Native American	31	0.27%
Asian	99	0.86%
Pacific Islander	7	0.06%
Other/mixed	506	4.38%
Hispanic or Latino	772	6.68%

As of the 2020 United States census, 11,564 people, 3,710 households, and 2,546 families resided in the city. In 2010, the population of Covington was 8,765. At the 2000 United States census, 8,483 people, 3,258 households, and 2,212 families lived in the city. The population density was 1,248.0 inhabitants per square mile (481.9/km^{2}). As of 2010, the 3,565 housing units had an average density of 524.5 per square mile (202.5/km^{2}).

In 2000, the racial makeup of the city was 77.45% White, 20.17% African American, 0.33% Native American, 0.34% Asian, 0.04% Pacific Islander, 0.25% from other races, and 1.43% from two or more races. Hispanics or Latinos of any race were 1.56% of the population. In 2019, the racial and ethnic makeup of the city was 77.6% White, 18.9% Black and African American, 0.2% American Indian or Alaska Native, 0.4% Asian, 0.6% some other race, and 2.3% two or more races.

At the 2000 U.S. census, of 3,258 households, 33.8% had children under 18 living with them, 46.8% were married couples living together, 17.2% had a female householder with no husband present, and 32.1% were not families. About 27.5% of all households were made up of individuals, and 9.9% had someone living alone who was 65 or older. The average household size was 2.52 and the average family size was 3.10.

In the city, the age distribution was 26.8% under 18, 8.5% from 18 to 24, 26.1% from 25 to 44, 24.1% from 45 to 64, and 14.5% who were 65 or older. The median age was 38 years. For every 100 females, there were 86.8 males. For every 100 females 18 and over, there were 80.0 males.

The median income for a household in the city was $36,949, and for a family was $50,332. Males had a median income of $36,434 versus $23,859 for females. The per capita income for the city was $21,438. About 11.8% of families and 16.1% of the population were below the poverty line, including 23.5% of those under 18 and 17.2% of those 65 or over. The 2019 American Community Survey determined the city had a median income of $71,548 and poverty rate of 13.4%.

== Economy ==
The city is home to Zen-Noh Grain Corporation, a subsidiary of the Japanese cooperative Zen-Noh. and the satellite communications company that operates a low Earth orbit satellite constellation, Globalstar. Bevolo Gas and Electric Lights has a manufacturing facility in Covington, and gChem also have their headquarters located in the city.

== Arts and culture ==
A 10-foot-tall (3.0 m) statue of Ronald Reagan on a 6-foot (1.8 m) base is reputed to be the world's largest of the former president.

== Parks and recreation ==
The Covington trail head is the start of Tammany Trace, a 31-mile (50 km) paved rails-to-trails path for hikers and bicyclists, which connects Covington with Mandeville, Abita Springs, Lacombe, and Slidell.

== Education ==
St. Tammany Parish Public Schools operates public schools in Covington.

- Covington High School (9-12)
- Pitcher Junior High School (7-8)
- Pine View Middle School (4-6)
- Covington Elementary School (K-3)
- Lyon Elementary School (K-3)

Private schools in the city limits include:

- Saint Paul's School
- Saint Scholastica Academy
- St. Peter Catholic School (of the Roman Catholic Archdiocese of New Orleans)

== Media ==
Movies filmed in Covington:

- 1997 — Eve's Bayou
- 2005 — Local Color
- 2014 — American Ultra
- 2019 — The Highwaymen

== Notable people ==
- Christian Bogle, racing driver
- Peggy Caserta, businesswoman and memoirist
- Edgerrin Cooper, professional football player with the Green Bay Packers
- Peggy Dow (Peggy Varnadow Helmerich), film actress and philanthropist, lived much of her childhood in Covington.
- Frank Burton Ellis, state senator (1940–1944), U.S. District Court judge, 1962–1965
- Dave Fortman, guitarist for the band Ugly Kid Joe and current American music producer, graduated from Covington High School
- Elizabeth Futral is an opera soprano reared in Covington. Her father was minister of the Covington First Baptist Church for many years.
- Daniel F. Galouye, science-fiction writer
- Katherine Haik, Miss Teen USA 2015
- Heath B. Jones, 14th Master Chief Petty Officer of the Coast Guard
- Pete Maravich, NBA all-star, lived in Covington until his death in 1988.
- Brendan Allen, Middleweight UFC fighter born in Covington
- Walker Percy, author and essayist, lived in Covington until his death in 1990.
- Harry Reeks, landscape painter and combat artist for the U.S. Marine Corps
- Leon Rene, songwriter
- Amy Serrano, filmmaker, poet, essayist, and humanitarian
- Amanda Shaw, Cajun fiddler, singer, and actress
- Ian Somerhalder, actor and model, grew up in Covington
- Stephen Stills, musician
- Hank Stram, NFL Hall of Fame coach, lived in Covington until his death in July 2005.
- Theo Von, comedian and podcaster grew up in Covington
