= Innovations for Learning =

U.S. nonprofit organization

Chapter One
- Formation: 1993
- Founders: Seth Weinberger
- Type: Global nonprofit early literacy organization
- Purpose: Improve childhood literacy
- Location(s): Canada; United Kingdom; United States
- Method: High-impact tutoring Enrichment tutoring Virtual volunteering
- Website: www.chapterone.org

Chapter One (previously known as Innovations for Learning), is a global education nonprofit organization, dedicated to improving early literacy outcomes for children in under-resourced schools. It is grounded in the belief that learning to read is a basic civil right with the power to transform lives. Chapter One recognizes the systemic barriers faced by students from low-income backgrounds, students of color, English Language Learners, and students with learning disabilities, therefore its stated mission is to provide equitable early literacy access and solutions to marginalized student populations. Founded by Seth Weinberger in 1993, the philanthropically supported initiative strives to bridge the gap by providing a literacy model to accelerate beginner reading for all students, regardless of socioeconomic background, race, language barriers, or learning differences primarily in Title 1 eligible schools.

== Background ==
Seth Weinberger launched Chapter One (then Innovation for Learning), in 1993 in the city of Evanston, Illinois. While a lawyer at Mayer Brown law firm, he and his wife, Barbara Goodman, a librarian, founded the Cherry Preschool with several other families. Seth saw the challenges teachers face in helping struggling students learn to read, so Weinberger became a self-taught programmer and began developing educational software as he continued his law career. The first three software games were licensed to an educational publisher that helped Chapter One grow in prominence. By 2009, he left his law practice to focus on continuing the expansion of Chapter One.

== Online Reading Volunteers ==
Chapter One’s Online Reading Volunteers (ORV) program supports corporate social responsibility (CSR) initiatives and equity and inclusion in education. Targeting schools with a high percentage of students coming from low-income families according to the federal Title 1 program, ORV started in Chicago, then expanded to New York City and Detroit in 2012. ORVs ongoing expansion into Seattle was supported with funding from Partners of '63, a philanthropic group of Harvard Business School graduates during their 2012 annual meeting in Seattle. The ORV program continues to grow with prominent companies and organizations around the globe launching virtual workplace volunteering with employees from General Motors, Chase Bank, Comerica Bank, Quicken Loans, and DTE Energy taking part. Employee volunteers e-mentor students by tutoring over video calls from their office during business hours as part of an optimal educational experience.

The ORV program trains corporate volunteers in early literacy instruction and then connects them with local schools and families within their community. Volunteers spend 30 minutes with assigned students engaging in virtual activities that build fluency, comprehension, phonics, and spelling skills.

According to a study by Curriculum & Evaluation Associates, students receiving at least twenty volunteer-led tutoring sessions, gained more than three reading levels compared to those who received fewer than five sessions. Research from the National Literacy Trust expanded research to examine the impact of the program in the United Kingdom and found that participating students increased 3.2 reading levels on average. Phonics scores also increased by an average of 9.3 points. This research concludes that students participating consistently with Online Reading Volunteers achieved greater reading and fluency gains.

== Instructor platform ==
Introduced in 2008 as a handheld device, then known as TeacherMate, the Instructor Platform was implemented in 12 Chicago schools and expanded to 500 schools across 14 states by the fall of 2009. Used by more than 40,000 students, Instructor Platform included educational software that covered basic math, reading, vocabulary, and spelling. Running full-color Flash games, teachers could download student records, generate reports, and set precise skills and levels that were synced with the reading and math curricula used in the school, including spelling words.

A partnership with Stanford University led by Paul Kim from the Stanford Graduate School of Education launched international pilot programs with the device in countries including Mexico, Korea, and the Philippines. A pilot study of the Instructor Platform tripled the literacy test results of teachers in Rwanda. Another pilot program in four Washington, D.C. schools generated results with more than 49% of students passing benchmark scores after one year of utilizing the Instructor Platform, an increase from 16%. A study by the University of Illinois Chicago of 176 first grade classrooms in Chicago Public Schools found that students who used the Instructor Platform performed higher on end-of-year reading tests in three categories than those who did not engage with the platform.

The transition from hardware to an app available on iOS devices continued Chapter One's growth into more schools. Miami-Dade County Public Schools implemented the downloadable reading program with the iPod Touch to about 600 students in 2012 after an initial pilot in some of the district's classrooms the previous year. Activities focused on improving phonics, comprehension, vocabulary, and reading fluency while the program combined teaching, tutoring, and technology.

== High-impact tutoring ==
Helping schools and districts in the US and Canada that are seeking to increase their early literacy focus, Chapter One provides high-impact tutoring to give students targeted and explicit one-to-one instruction during the school day. Chapter One has implemented its high-impact tutoring model in many large urban school district including Chicago Public Schools, Seattle, Baltimore City Public Schools, Indianapolis, and Columbus, as well as Broward County Public Schools, the sixth largest school district in the United States.

Chapter One hires college degreed ELIs who are trained and supported to tutor students. Guided by philanthropically supported technology, such as devices and proprietary software, Early Literacy Interventionists conference with each student two to four times per week for about five minutes. The software enables ELIs to assess and instruct contemporaneously and sync assessment data to the cloud in real-time. They assess each learner's needs and cater the phonics-focused instruction to meet the unique learning needs of each student.

According to a study on the impact of high-impact tutoring with Chapter One, a greater percentage of early learners receiving one-to-one tutoring outperformed those not tutored on an assessment measuring emergent reading proficiency; demonstrated a significantly higher rate of progression in their reading; and achieved grade level proficiency.

== Global reach ==
Expanding operations to the United Kingdom with support from the British global asset management group Janus Henderson, the ORV program began serving students in cities including London, Leeds, Doncaster, and Brandford in 2018. International expansion also includes Canada when Chapter One Canada launched in Ontario that same year. Prior to the 2018 expansion of international operations, Chapter One also served schools in countries including Mexico, Korea, the Philippines, Rwanda, Uganda, and Sri Lanka.

A grant from the TELUS Friendly Future Foundation in Canada helped expand programming to Indigenous children in Ontario and British Columbia. The supported expansion included School District 60: Peace River North and Tia-o-qui-aht First Nation on Vancouver Island. Also in Canada, Symcor sponsored an e-story book series written and illustrated by Indigenous artists with storylines designed to support language revitalization and advance priorities, perspectives, and world views of the Indigenous communities.

== Combatting COVID-19 learning loss ==
Funding from the Janus Henderson Foundation to combat the learning loss caused by COVID-19 helped Chapter One ensure an additional 300 students in the United Kingdom received in-home tutoring. In addition, Janus Henderson's grant provided support to expand high-impact tutoring in Denver Public Schools.

North Chicago School District #187 launched high-impact tutoring with Chapter One to accelerate learning for students who had fallen behind in early literacy due to COVID-19 school closures. Early Literacy Interventionists began working virtually with district kindergartners and first graders along with their families at the start of the 2020–21 academic year when schools went remote.

A partnership with the global manufacturing company Laitram developed a pilot program called "Ready-Set-Read!" for the manufacturing company's employees and their families to combat the education disruption caused by COVID-19.
