= Pulley =

Wheel to support movement and change of direction of a taut cable

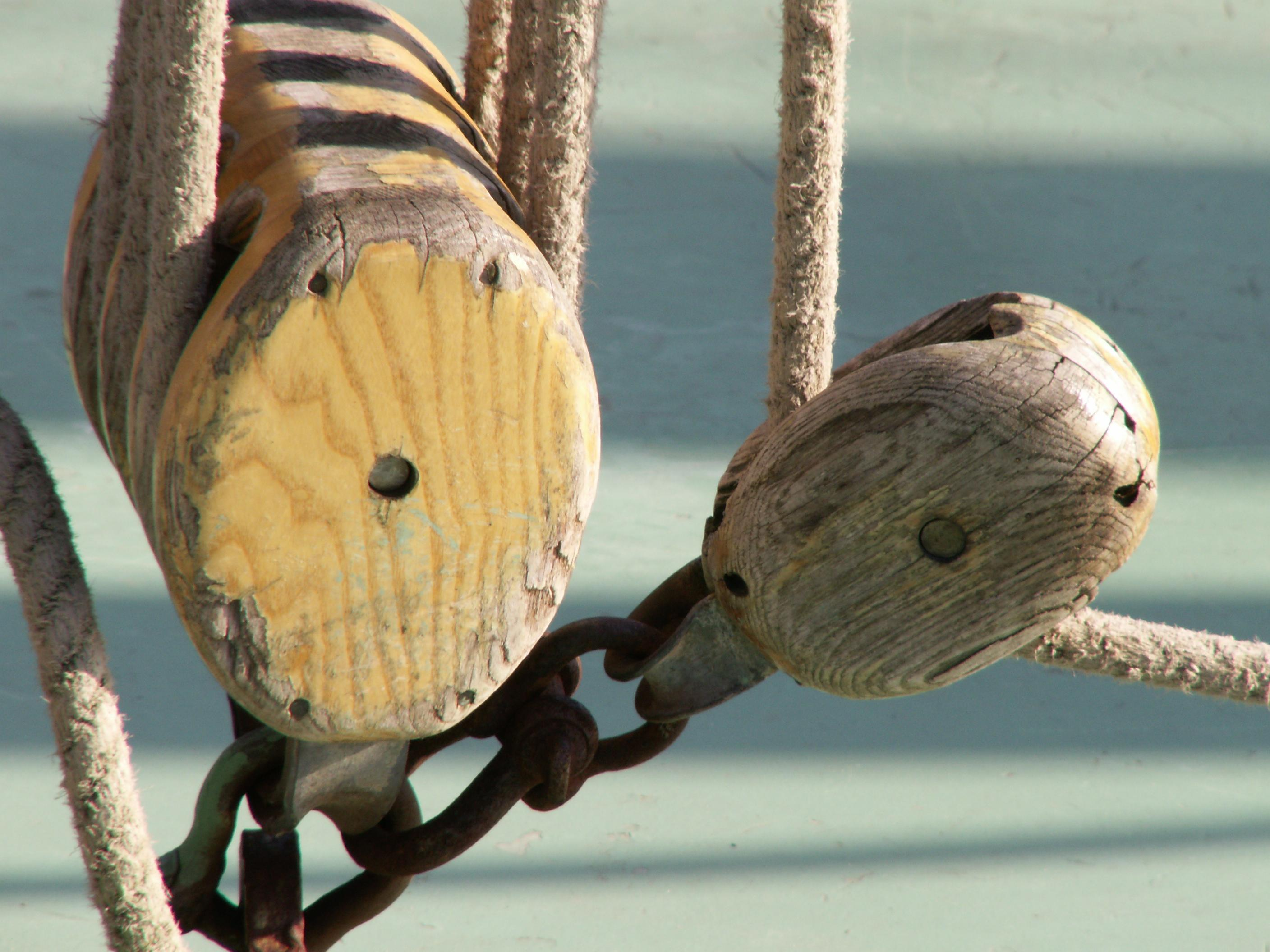
- Pulleys on a ship. In this context, pulleys are normally known as blocks
- Classification: Simple machine
- Industry: Construction, transportation
- Wheels: 1
- Axles: 1

A pulley is a wheel on an axle or shaft enabling a taut cable or belt passing over the wheel to move and change direction, or transfer power between itself and a shaft. A sheave (/ʃiːv/) or pulley wheel is a grooved wheel often used for holding a belt, wire rope, or rope and incorporated into a pulley. The sheave spins on an axle or bearing inside the frame of the pulley. This allows the wire or rope to move freely, minimizing friction and wear on the cable. Sheaves can be used to redirect a cable or rope, lift loads, and transmit power. The words sheave and pulley are sometimes used interchangeably.

A pulley may have a groove or grooves between flanges around its circumference to locate the cable or belt. The drive element of a pulley system can be a rope, cable, belt, or chain.

== History ==
The earliest evidence of pulleys dates back to Ancient Egypt in the Twelfth Dynasty (1991–1802 BC) and Mesopotamia in the early 2nd millennium BC, and then appeared in Ancient Egypt and Ancient Greece where it was described by the Greek mathematician Archytas of Tarentum.

In Roman Egypt, Hero of Alexandria (c. 10–70 AD) identified the pulley as one of six simple machines used to lift weights. Pulleys are assembled to form a block and tackle in order to provide mechanical advantage to apply large forces. Pulleys are also assembled as part of belt and chain drives in order to transmit power from one rotating shaft to another. Plutarch's Parallel Lives recounts a scene where Archimedes proved the effectiveness of compound pulleys and the block-and-tackle system by using one to pull a fully laden ship towards him as if it were gliding through water.

== Block and tackle ==
Various ways of rigging a tackle

A block is a set of pulleys (wheels) assembled so that each pulley rotates independently from every other pulley. Two blocks with a rope attached to one of the blocks and threaded through the two sets of pulleys form a block and tackle.

A block and tackle is assembled so one block is attached to the fixed mounting point and the other is attached to the moving load. The ideal mechanical advantage of the block and tackle is equal to the number of sections of the rope that support the moving block.

In the diagram on the right, the ideal mechanical advantage of each of the block-and-tackle assemblies shown is as follows:

- Gun tackle: 2
- Luff tackle: 3
- Double tackle: 4
- Gyn tackle: 5
- Threefold purchase: 6

== Rope and pulley systems ==
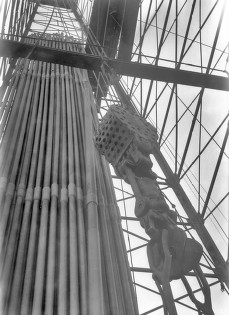
Pulley in oil derrick

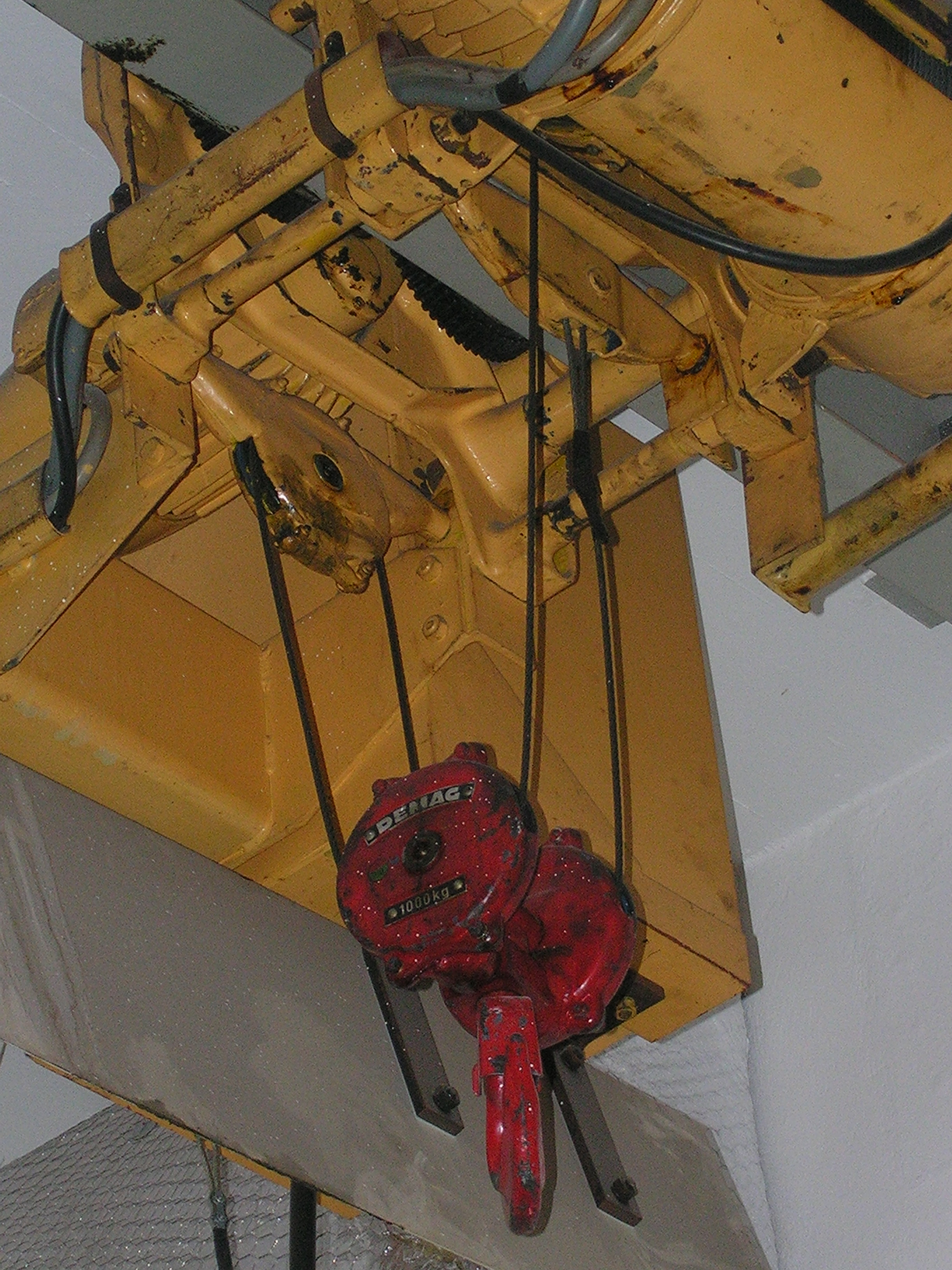
A hoist using the compound pulley system yielding an advantage of 4. The single fixed pulley is installed on the hoist. The two movable pulleys (joined) are attached to the hook. One end of the rope is attached to the crane frame, another to the winch.

A rope and pulley system, that is, a block and tackle, is characterised by the use of a single continuous rope to transmit a tension force around one or more pulleys to lift or move a load—the rope may be a light line or a strong cable. This system is included in the list of simple machines identified by Renaissance scientists.

If the rope and pulley system does not dissipate or store energy, then its mechanical advantage is the number of parts of the rope that act on the load. This can be shown as follows.

Consider the set of pulleys that form the moving block and the parts of the rope that support this block. If there are p of these parts of the rope supporting the load W, then a force balance on the moving block shows that the tension in each of the parts of the rope must be W/p. This means the input force applied to the rope is T=W/p. Thus, the block and tackle reduces the input force by the factor p.

== Adjustable pulley ==
A "sheave" can also refer to a pulley which has an adjustable operating diameter for use with a mechanical belt. This is accomplished by constructing the pulley out of several pieces. The two main "halves" of the pulley can be moved closer together or farther apart, thus altering the operational diameter. The usual construction is some sort of locking collar or set screws to secure the components, one half with a threaded central shaft and one half with a threaded center. By rotating the components, one can "screw" the parts closer together or further apart, thus changing the distance between the two halves and allowing the belt to ride higher or lower in the groove. The adjustments are constrained to a specific range of sizes and are not limitless. One application of this is the Variomatic automatic transmission.

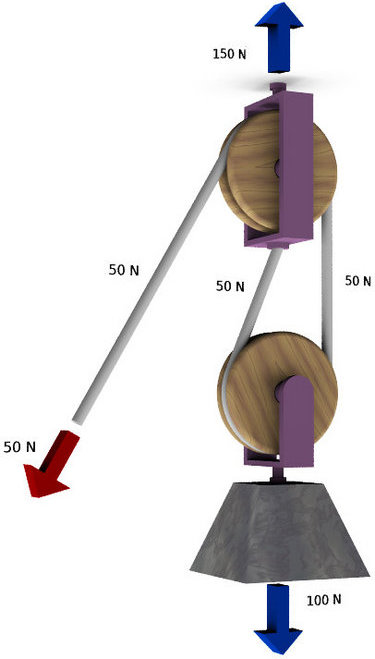
A gun tackle has a single pulleys in both the fixed and moving blocks with two rope parts supporting the load W.

Separation of the pulleys in the gun tackle shows the force balance that results in a rope tension of W/2.
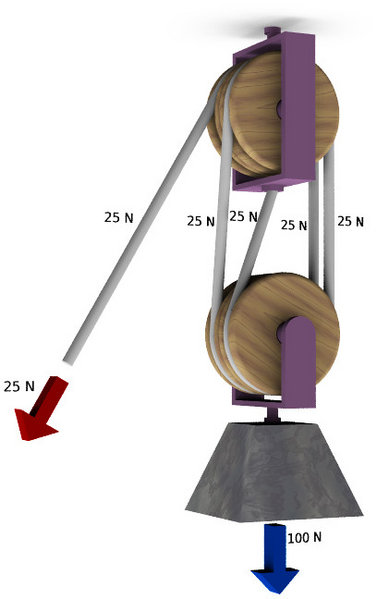
A double tackle has dual pulleys in both the fixed and moving blocks with four rope parts supporting the load W.

Separation of the pulleys in the double tackle shows the force balance that results in a rope tension of W/4.

=== Method of operation ===
The simplest theory of operation for a pulley system assumes that the pulleys and lines are weightless and that there is no energy loss due to friction. It is also assumed that the lines do not stretch.

In equilibrium, the forces on the moving block must sum to zero. In addition the tension in the rope must be the same for each of its parts. This means that the two parts of the rope supporting the moving block must each support half the load.

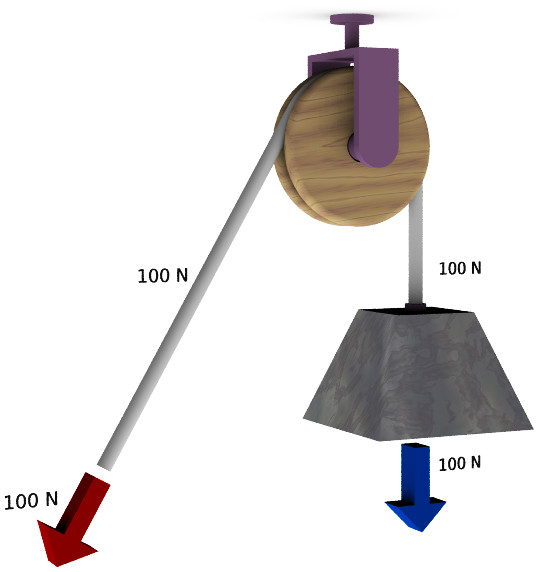
Fixed pulley

Diagram 1: The load F on the moving pulley is balanced by the tension in two parts of the rope supporting the pulley.

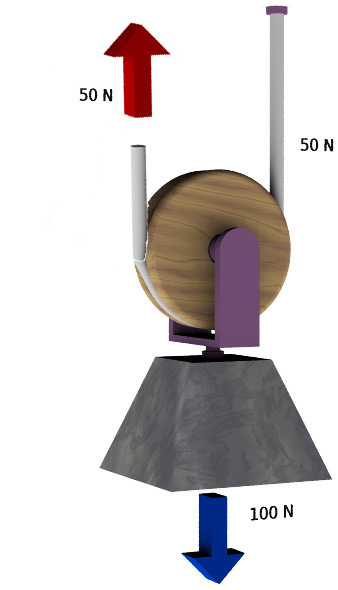
Movable pulley

Diagram 2: A movable pulley lifting the load W is supported by two rope parts with tension W/2.

These are different types of pulley systems:

- Fixed: A fixed pulley has an axle mounted in bearings attached to a supporting structure. A fixed pulley changes the direction of the force on a rope or belt that moves along its circumference. Mechanical advantage is gained by combining a fixed pulley with a movable pulley or another fixed pulley of a different diameter.
- Movable: A movable pulley has an axle in a movable block. A single movable pulley is supported by two parts of the same rope and has a mechanical advantage of two.
- Compound: A combination of fixed and movable pulleys forms a block and tackle. A block and tackle can have several pulleys mounted on the fixed and moving axles, further increasing the mechanical advantage.
Diagram 3: The gun tackle "rove to advantage" has the rope attached to the moving pulley. The tension in the rope is W/3, yielding an advantage of three.

Diagram 3a: The Luff tackle adds a fixed pulley "rove to disadvantage." The tension in the rope remains W/3, yielding an advantage of three.

The mechanical advantage of the gun tackle can be increased by interchanging the fixed and moving blocks so the rope is attached to the moving block and the rope is pulled in the direction of the lifted load. In this case the block and tackle is said to be "rove to advantage." Diagram 3 shows that now three rope parts support the load W which means the tension in the rope is W/3. Thus, the mechanical advantage is three.

By adding a pulley to the fixed block of a gun tackle the direction of the pulling force is reversed though the mechanical advantage remains the same, Diagram 3a. This is an example of the Luff tackle.

=== Free body diagrams ===
The mechanical advantage of a pulley system can be analysed using free body diagrams which balance the tension force in the rope with the force of gravity on the load. In an ideal system, the massless and frictionless pulleys do not dissipate energy and allow for a change of direction of a rope that does not stretch or wear. In this case, a force balance on a free body that includes the load, W, and n supporting sections of a rope with tension T, yields:

$$n T -W = 0.$$

The ratio of the load to the input tension force is the mechanical advantage MA of the pulley system,

$$MA = \frac{W}{T} = n.$$

Thus, the mechanical advantage of the system is equal to the number of sections of rope supporting the load.

== Belt-and-pulley systems ==
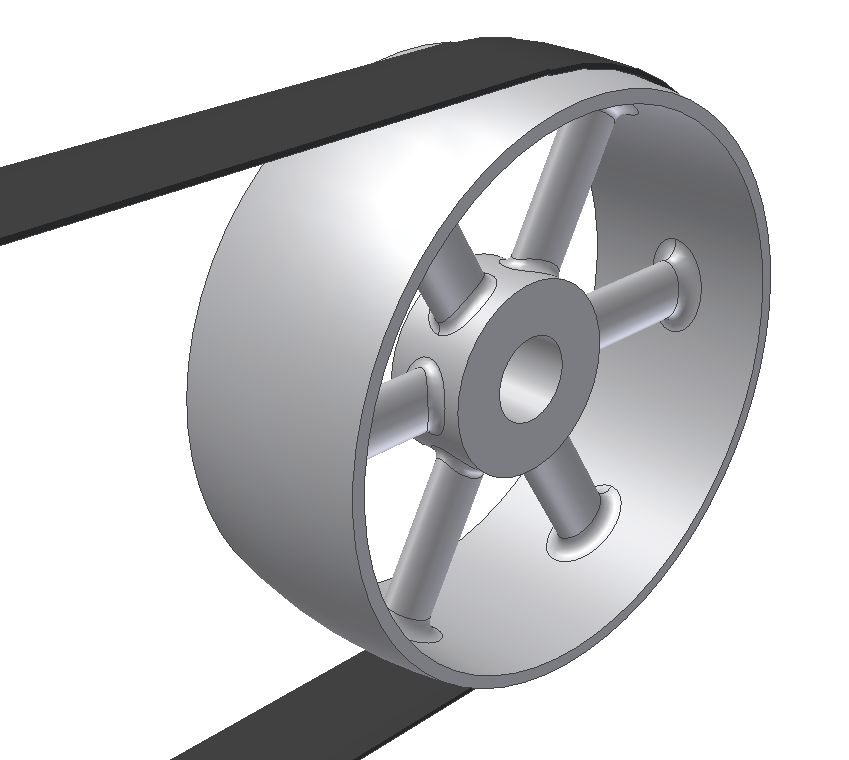
Flat belt on a crowned belt pulley

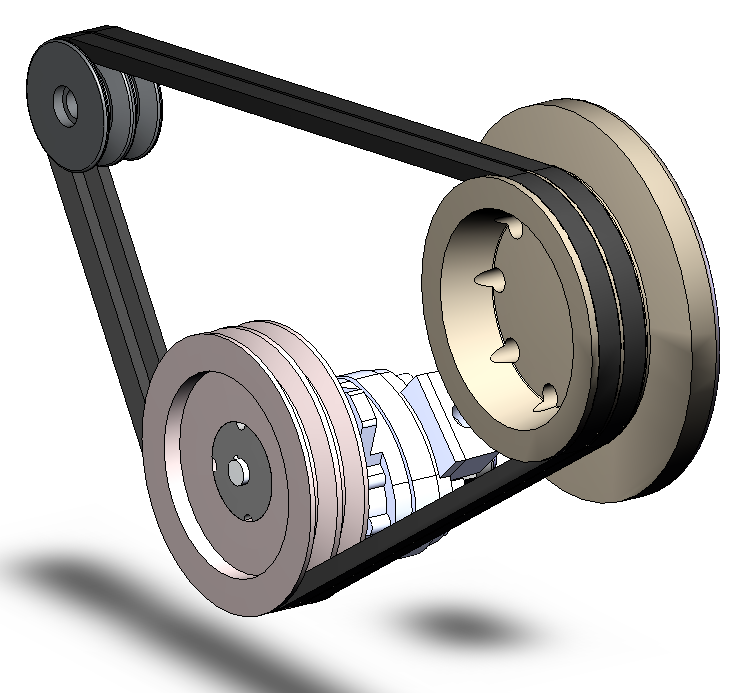
Belt-and-pulley system

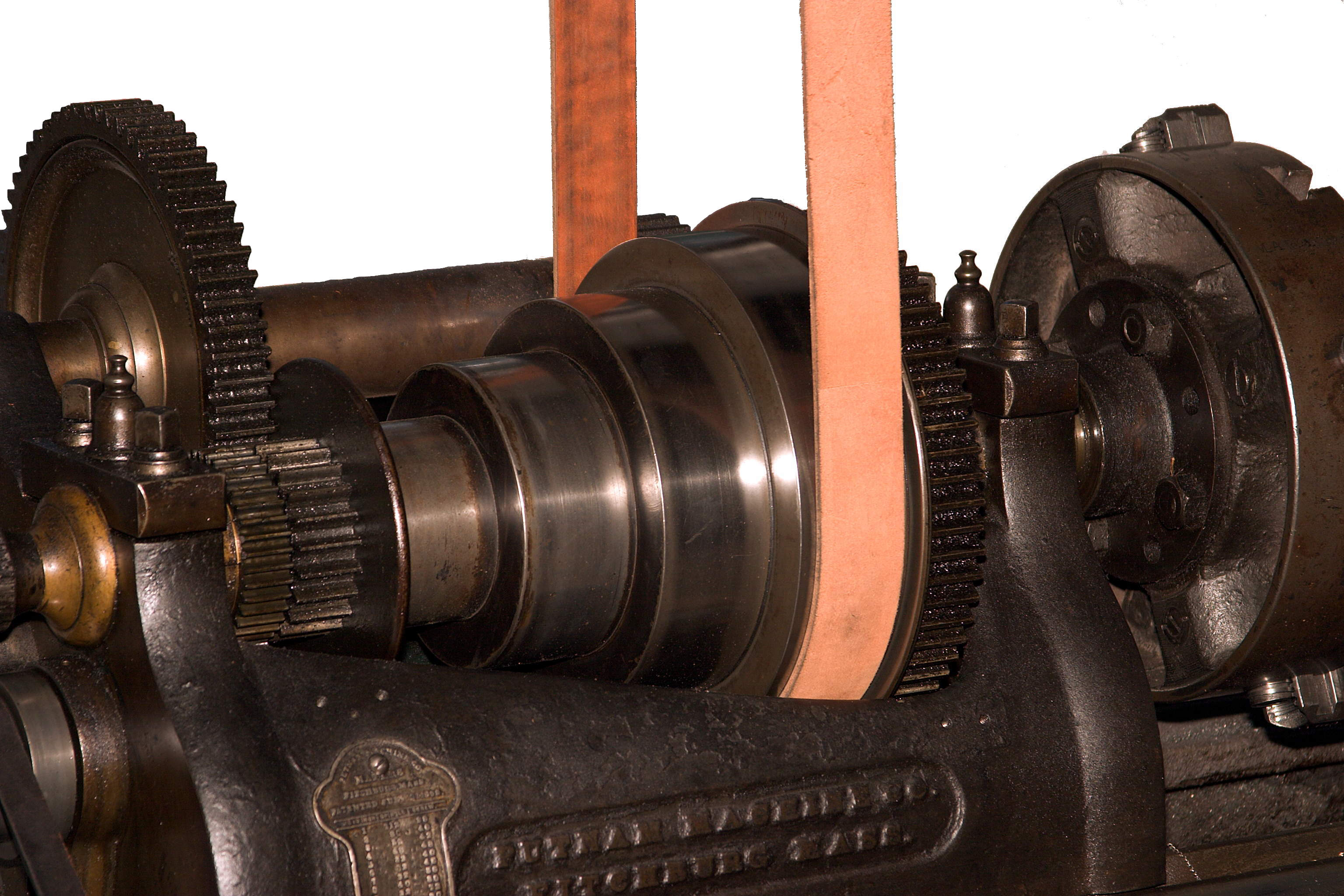
Cone pulley driven from above by a line shaft

A belt-and-pulley system is characterized by two or more pulleys in common to a belt. This allows for mechanical power, torque, and speed to be transmitted across axles. If the pulleys are of differing diameters, a mechanical advantage is realized.

A belt drive is analogous to that of a chain drive; however, a belt sheave may be smooth (devoid of discrete interlocking members as would be found on a chain sprocket, spur gear, or timing belt) so that the mechanical advantage is approximately given by the ratio of the pitch diameter of the sheaves only, not fixed exactly by the ratio of teeth as with gears and sprockets.

In the case of a drum-style pulley, without a groove or flanges, the pulley often is slightly convex to keep the flat belt centered. It is referred to as a crowned pulley. Once widely used on factory line shafts, this type of pulley is still found driving the rotating brush in upright vacuum cleaners, belt sanders and bandsaws. Agricultural tractors built up to the early 1950s generally had a belt pulley for a flat belt (which is what Belt Pulley magazine was named after). It has been replaced by other mechanisms with more flexibility in methods of use, such as power take-off and hydraulics.

Just as the diameters of gears (and, correspondingly, their number of teeth) determine a gear ratio and thus the speed increases or reductions and the mechanical advantage that they can deliver, the diameters of pulleys determine those same factors. Cone pulleys and step pulleys (which operate on the same principle, although the names tend to be applied to flat-belt versions and V-belt versions, respectively) are a way to provide multiple drive ratios in a belt-and-pulley system that can be shifted as needed, just as a transmission provides this function with a gear train that can be shifted. V-belt step pulleys are the most common way that drill presses deliver a range of spindle speeds.

With belts and pulleys, friction is one of the most important factors. Some uses for belts and pulleys involve peculiar angles (leading to bad belt tracking and possibly slipping the belt off the pulley) or low–belt-tension environments, causing unnecessary slippage of the belt and hence extra wear to the belt. To solve this, pulleys are sometimes lagged. Lagging is the term used to describe a coating, cover or wearing surface with various textured patterns applied to pulley shells, or the application thereof. Lagging is often used to extend the life of the shell by providing a replaceable outer layer or to improve the friction between the belt and the pulley. Notably, drive pulleys are often rubber-lagged (coated with a rubber friction layer) for exactly this reason. Applying powdered rosin to the belt may increase the friction temporarily but may shorten the life of the belt.

== See also ==
- Block (sailing) – Sailing term; single or multiple pulley
- Conveyor pulley
- Deadeye – Item used in rigging of sailing ships
- Differential pulley – Self-balancing mechanical lifting hoist
- Hoist – Device used for lifting or lowering a load
- Idler pulley – Type of wheel
