= Conveyor belt =

Close-loop rubber band used in motorized conveying system

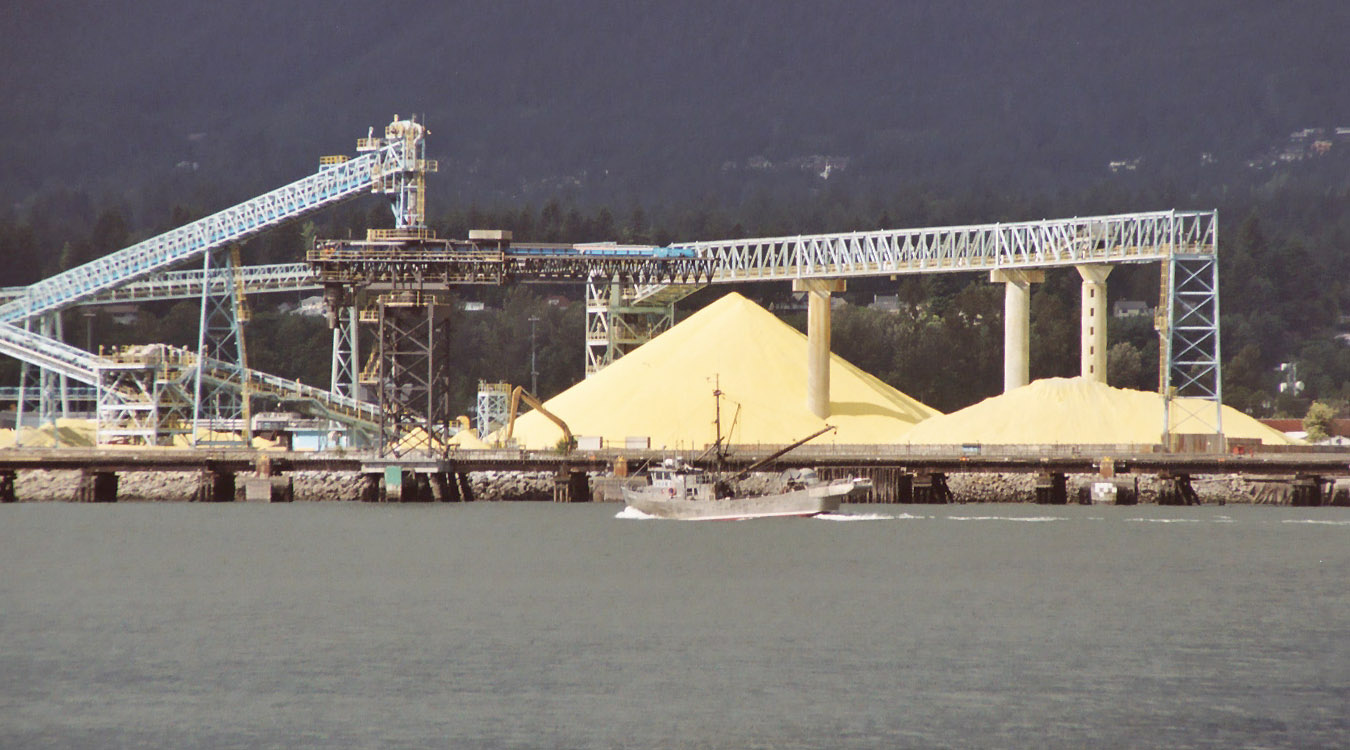
- These conveyor structures contain belts for moving bulk sulfur from railcars to storage piles and from the piles to ships.
- Classification: Conveyor system
- Industry: Various
- Application: Transportation
- Inventor: Thomas Robins
- Invented: 1892 (134 years ago)

A conveyor belt is the carrying medium of a belt conveyor system (often shortened to a belt conveyor). A belt conveyor system consists of two or more pulleys (sometimes referred to as drums), with a closed loop of carrying medium—the conveyor belt—that rotates about them. One or both of the pulleys are powered, moving the belt and the material on the belt forward. The powered pulley is called the drive pulley, while the unpowered pulley is called the idler pulley. There are two main industrial classes of belt conveyors; Those in general material handling such as those moving boxes along inside a factory and bulk material handling such as those used to transport large volumes of resources and agricultural materials, including grain, salt, coal, ore, sand, overburden and more.

== Overview ==
Point of contact between a power transmission belt and its pulley. A conveyor belt uses a wide belt and pulleys and is supported by rollers or a flat pan along its path.

Conveyors are durable and reliable components used in automated distribution and warehousing, as well as manufacturing and production facilities. In combination with computer-controlled pallet handling equipment this allows for more efficient retail, wholesale, and manufacturing distribution. It is considered a labor-saving system that allows large volumes to move rapidly through a process, allowing companies to ship or receive higher volumes with smaller storage space and with labor expense.

Belt conveyors are the most commonly used powered conveyors because they are the most versatile and the least expensive. Products are conveyed directly on the belt so both regular and irregular shaped objects, large or small, light and heavy, can be transported successfully. Belt conveyors are also manufactured with curved sections that use tapered rollers and curved belting to convey products around a corner. These conveyor systems are commonly used in postal sorting offices and airport baggage handling systems.

Belt conveyors are generally fairly similar in construction consisting of a metal frame with rollers at either end of a flat metal bed. Rubber conveyor belts are commonly used to convey items with irregular bottom surfaces, small items that would fall in between rollers (e.g. a sushi conveyor bar), or bags of product that would sag between rollers. The belt is looped around each of the rollers and when one of the rollers is powered (by an electrical motor) the belting slides across the solid metal frame bed, moving the product. In heavy use applications, the beds in which the belting is pulled over are replaced with rollers. The rollers allow weight to be conveyed as they reduce the amount of friction generated from the heavier loading on the belting. The exception to the standard belt conveyor construction is the sandwich belt conveyor. The sandwich belt conveyor uses two conveyor belts, instead of one. These two conventional conveyor belts are positioned face to face, to firmly contain the items being carried in a "sandwich-like" hold.

Belt conveyors can be used to transport products in a straight line or through changes in elevation or direction. For conveying bulk materials, over gentle slopes or gentle curvatures, a troughed belt conveyor is used. The trough of the belt ensures that the flowable material is contained within the edges of the belt. The trough is achieved by keeping the idler rollers in an angle to the horizontal at the sides of the idler frame. A pipe conveyor is used for material travel paths that require sharper bends and inclines up to 35 degrees. A pipe conveyor features the edges of the belt being rolled together to form a circular section like a pipe. Like a troughed belt conveyor, a pipe conveyor also uses idler rollers. However, in this case, the idler frame completely surrounds the conveyor belt helping it to retain the pipe section while pushing it forward. In the case of travel paths requiring high angles and snake-like curvatures, a sandwich belt is used. The sandwich belt design enables materials carried to travel along a path of high inclines up to 90-degree angles, enabling a vertical path as opposed to a horizontal one. This transport option is also powered by idlers.

Other important components of the belt conveying system apart from the pulleys and idler rollers include the drive arrangement of reducer gear boxes, drive motors, and associated couplings. scrapers to clean the belt, chutes for controlling the discharge direction, skirts for containing the discharge on the receiving belt, take up assembly for "tensioning" the belt, safety switches for personnel safety and technological structures like stringer, short post, drive frames, pulley frames make up the balance items to complete the belt conveying system. In certain applications, belt conveyors can also be used for static accumulation or cartons.

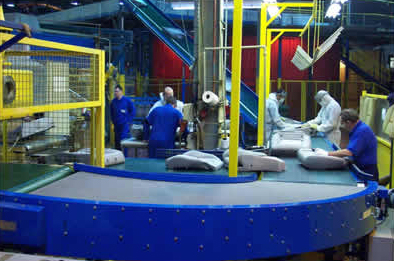
Belt conveyor systems at a packing depot

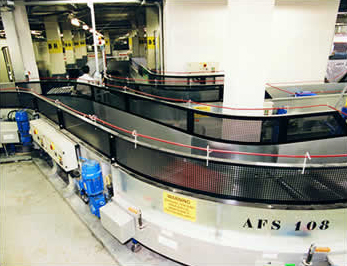
Baggage handling belt conveyor system

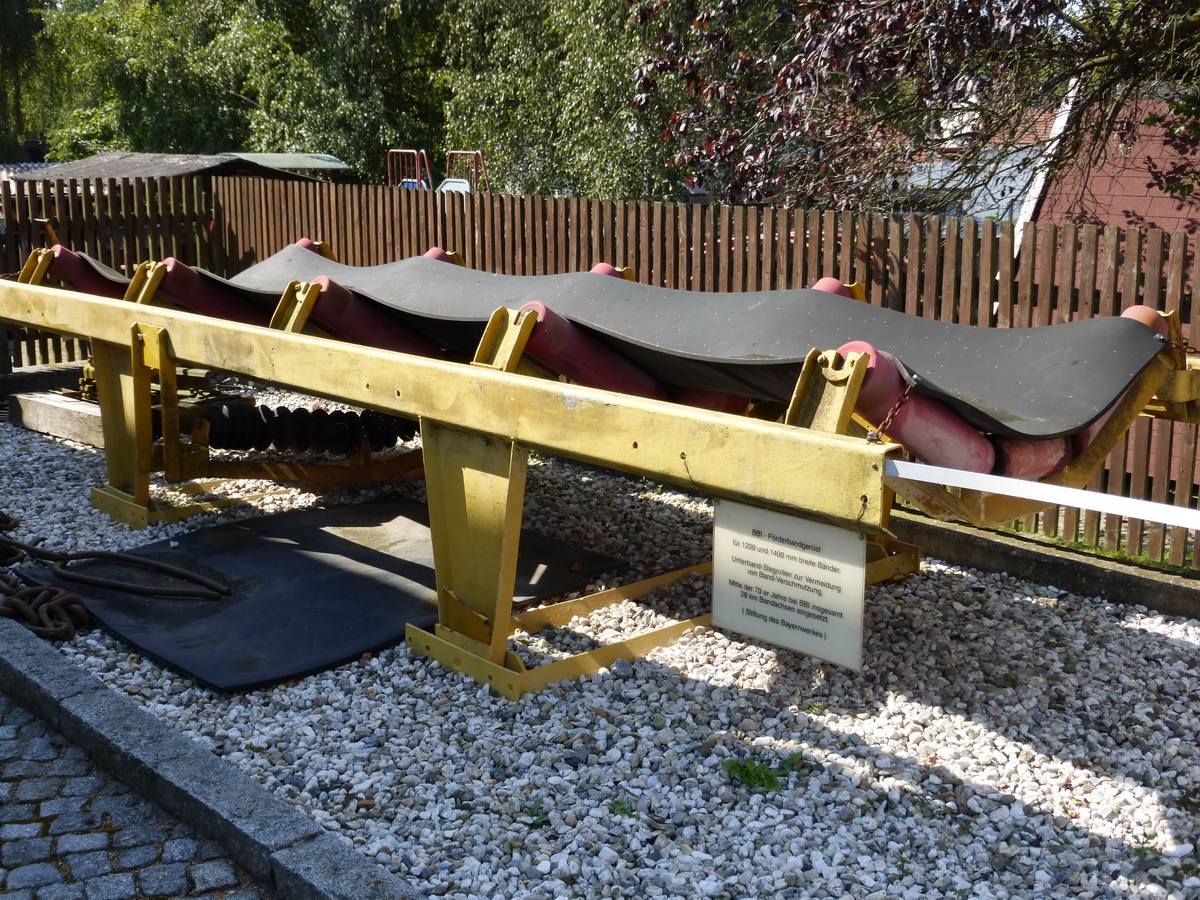
Belt conveyor from an open-pit lignite mine in Bavaria

== History ==
Primitive conveyor belts have been in use since the 19th century. In 1868, an English shipwright Joseph Thomas Parlour from Pimlico patented a grain elevator with a conveyor belt while Illinoisan Charles Denton of Ames Plow Co. patented a reaper with a belt "conveyer". By the 1880s conveyor belts were used in American elevators, sugarcane mills and sawmills, as well as British maltings.

In 1892, Thomas Robins began a series of inventions which led to the development of a conveyor belt used for carrying coal, ores and other products. In 1901, Sandvik invented and started the production of steel conveyor belts. In 1905, Richard Sutcliffe invented the first conveyor belts for use in coal mines, which revolutionized the mining industry. In 1913, Henry Ford introduced conveyor-belt assembly lines at Ford Motor Company's Highland Park, Michigan factory.

In 1972, the French society REI created in New Caledonia the longest straight-belt conveyor in the world in that moment, at a length of 13.8 km (8.6 miles). Hyacynthe Marcel Bocchetti was the concept designer. The longest conveyor belt is that of the Bou Craa phosphate mine in Western Sahara (1973, 98 km in 11 sections). The longest single-span conveyor belt is at the Boddington bauxite mine in Western Australia (31 km).

In 1957, the B. F. Goodrich Company patented a Möbius strip conveyor belt, that it went on to produce as the "Turnover Conveyor Belt System". Incorporating a half-twist, it had the advantage over conventional belts of a longer life because it could expose all of its surface area to wear and tear. Such Möbius strip belts are no longer manufactured because untwisted modern belts can be made more durable by constructing them from several layers of different materials. In 1970, Intralox, a Louisiana-based company, registered the first patent for all plastic, modular belting.

== Structure ==
The belt consists of one or more layers of material. It is common for belts to have three layers: a top cover, a carcass and a bottom cover. The purpose of the carcass is to provide linear strength and shape. The carcass is often a woven or metal fabric having a warp & weft. The warp refers to longitudinal cords whose characteristics of resistance and elasticity define the running properties of the belt. The weft represents the whole set of transversal cables allowing to the belt specific resistance against cuts, tears and impacts and at the same time high flexibility. The most common carcass materials are steel, polyester, nylon, cotton and aramid (class of heat-resistant and strong synthetic fibers, with Twaron or Kevlar as brand names). The covers are usually various rubber or plastic compounds specified by use of the belt.

Steel conveyor belts are used when high strength class is required. For example, the highest strength class conveyor belt installed is made of steel cords. This conveyor belt has a strength class of 10,000 N/mm (57,000 lb_{f}/in) and it operates at Chuquicamata mine, in Chile. Polyester, nylon and cotton are popular with low strength classes. Aramid is used in the range 630–3,500 N/mm (3,600–20,000 lb_{f}/in). The advantages of using aramid are energy savings, enhanced lifetimes and improved productivity. As an example, a 2,250-newton-per-millimetre (12,800 lb_{f}/in), 3,400-metre-long (3,700 yd) underground belt installed at Baodian Coal Mine, part of in Yanzhou Coal Mining Company, China, was reported to provide energy savings of over 15%. Whilst Shenhua Group, has installed several aramid conveyor belts, including a 4,400-newton-per-millimetre (25,000 lb_{f}/in) belt with a length of 11,600 m (7.2 miles).

== Applications ==
Today there are different types of conveyor belts that have been created for conveying different kinds of material available in PVC and rubber materials. Material flowing over the belt may be weighed in transit using a beltweigher. Belts with regularly spaced partitions, known as elevator belts, are used for transporting loose materials up steep inclines. Belt Conveyors are used in self-unloading bulk freighters and in live bottom trucks. Belt conveyor technology is also used in conveyor transport such as moving sidewalks or escalators, as well as on many manufacturing assembly lines. Stores often have conveyor belts at the check-out counter to move shopping items, and may use checkout dividers in this process. Ski areas also use conveyor belts to transport skiers up the hill. Industrial and manufacturing applications for belt conveyors include package handling, trough belt conveyors, trash handling, bag handling, coding conveyors, and more. Integration of Human-Machine Interface (HMI) to operate the conveyor system can also help with control, accuracy and efficiency.

=== Long belt conveyors ===
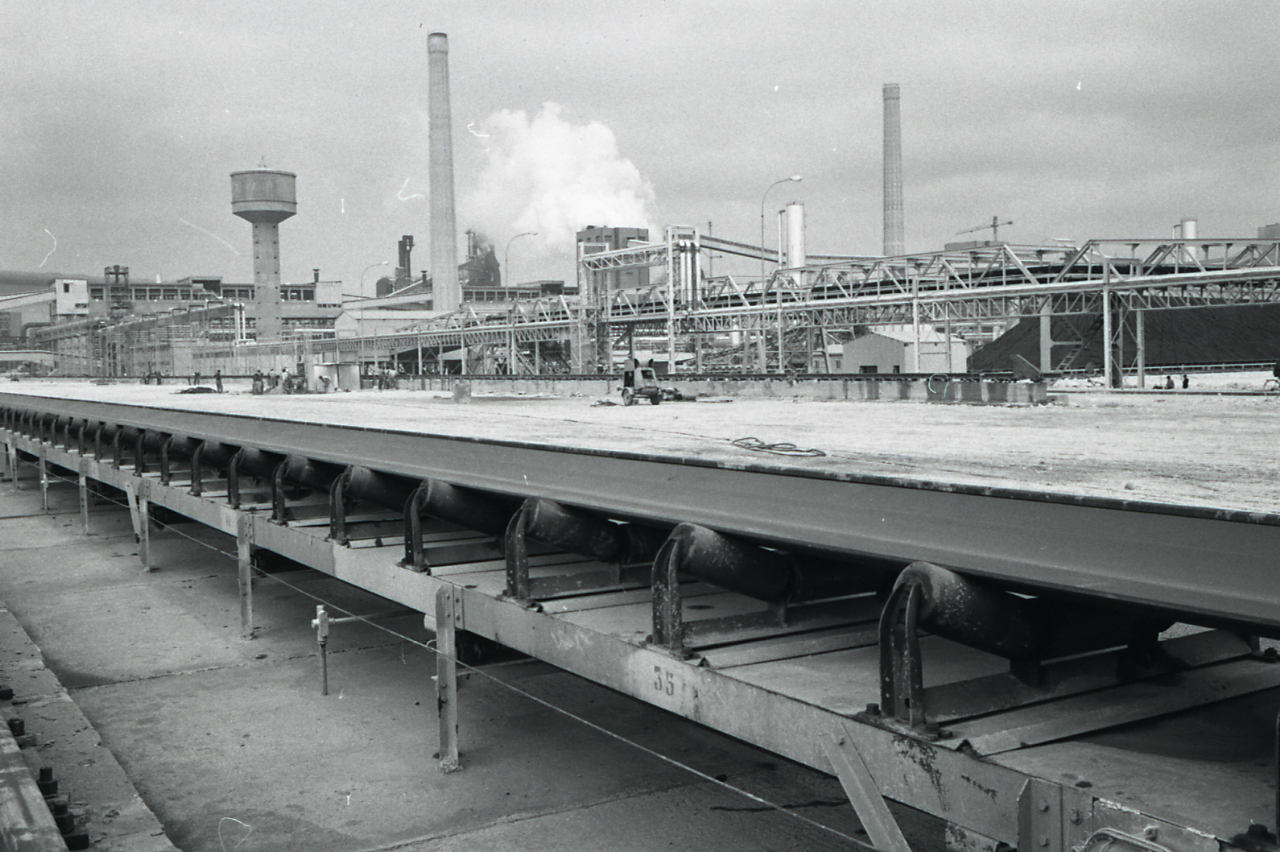
Taranto, Paolo Monti, 1964

The longest belt conveyor system in the world is in Western Sahara. It was built in 1972 by Friedrich Krupp GmbH (now thyssenkrupp) and is 98 km (61 miles) long, from the phosphate mines of Bu Craa to the coast south of El-Aaiun.

The longest conveyor system in an airport is the Dubai International Airport baggage handling system at 63 km (39 miles). It was installed by Siemens and commissioned in 2008, and has a combination of traditional belt conveyors and tray conveyors.

Boddington Bauxite Mine in Western Australia is officially recognized as having the world's longest single flight conveyor. Single flight means the load is not transferred, it is a single continuous system for the entire length. This conveyor is a cable belt conveyor system with a 31-kilometre-long (19 mi) conveyor feeding a 20-kilometre-long (12 mi) conveyor. Cable belt conveyors are a variation on the more conventional idler belt system. Instead of running on top of idlers, cable belt conveyors are supported by two endless steel cables (steel wire rope) which are in turn supported by idler pulley wheels. This system feeds bauxite through the difficult terrain of the Darling Ranges to the Worsley Alumina refinery.

The second longest single trough belt conveyor is the 26.8-kilometre-long (16.7 mi) Impumelelo conveyor near Secunda, South Africa. It was designed by Conveyor Dynamics, Inc. based in Bellingham, Washington, USA and constructed by ELB Engineering based in Johannesburg South Africa. The conveyor transports 2,400 t/h (2,600 short tons per hour) coal from a mine to a refinery that converts the coal to diesel fuel. The third longest trough belt conveyor in the world is the 20-kilometre-long (12 mi) Curragh conveyor near Westfarmers, QLD, Australia. Conveyor Dynamics, Inc. supplied the basic engineering, control system and commissioning. Detail engineering and Construction was completed by Laing O'Rourke.

The longest single-belt international conveyor runs from Meghalaya in India to a cement factory at Chhatak Bangladesh. It is about 17 km (11 miles) long and conveys limestone and shale at 960 t/h (1,060 short tons per hour), from the quarry in India to the cement factory (7 km or 4.3 miles long in India and 10 km or 6.2 miles long in Bangladesh). The conveyor was engineered by AUMUND France and Larsen & Toubro. The conveyor is actuated by three synchronized drive units for a total power of about 1.8 MW supplied by ABB (two drives at the head end in Bangladesh and one drive at the tail end in India). The conveyor belt was manufactured in 300-metre (980-foot) lengths on the Indian side and 300-metre (980-foot) of lengths on the Bangladesh side. The idlers, or rollers, of the system are unique in that they are designed to accommodate both horizontal and vertical curves along the terrain. Dedicated vehicles were designed for the maintenance of the conveyor, which is always at a minimum height of 5 metres (16 ft) above the ground to avoid being flooded during monsoon periods.

=== Belt conveyor safety system ===
Conveyors used in industrial settings include tripping mechanisms such as trip cords along the length of the conveyor. This allows for workers to immediately shut down the conveyor when a problem arises. Warning alarms are included to notify employees that a conveyor is about to turn on. In the United States, the Occupational Safety and Health Administration has issued regulations for conveyor safety, as OSHA 1926.555.

Some other systems used to safeguard the conveyor are belt sway switches, speed switches, belt rip switches, and emergency stops. The belt sway switch will stop the conveyor if the belt starts losing its alignment along the structure. The speed switch will stop the belt if the switch is not registering that the belt is running at the required speed. The belt rip switch will stop the belt when there is a cut, or a flap indicating that the belt is in danger of further damage. An emergency stop may be located on the conveyor control box in case of trip chord malfunctions.

=== Reuse ===
Worn rubber or elastomer belts can be reused in many ways. Applications for the material include toolbox liners, anti-fatigue floor mats, dock bumpers, landscale edging, livestock fencing, and water diversion.

== See also ==
- Check weigher
- Conveyor pulley
- Conveyor system
- Grain bin
- Lineshaft roller conveyor
- Travelator
- Tensioner
- Treadmill
