= Conveyor transport =

Conveyor transport is the broad category of transport modes that includes modes developed from the idea of a conveyor belt. Examples include:

- Conveyor belt, two or more pulleys, with a continuous loop of material that rotates about them
- Escalator, a moving staircase, for carrying people between floors of a building
- Moving sidewalk, for transporting along a horizontal or inclined surface

== See also ==
- Public transport
