= Bagger =

Grocery store employee

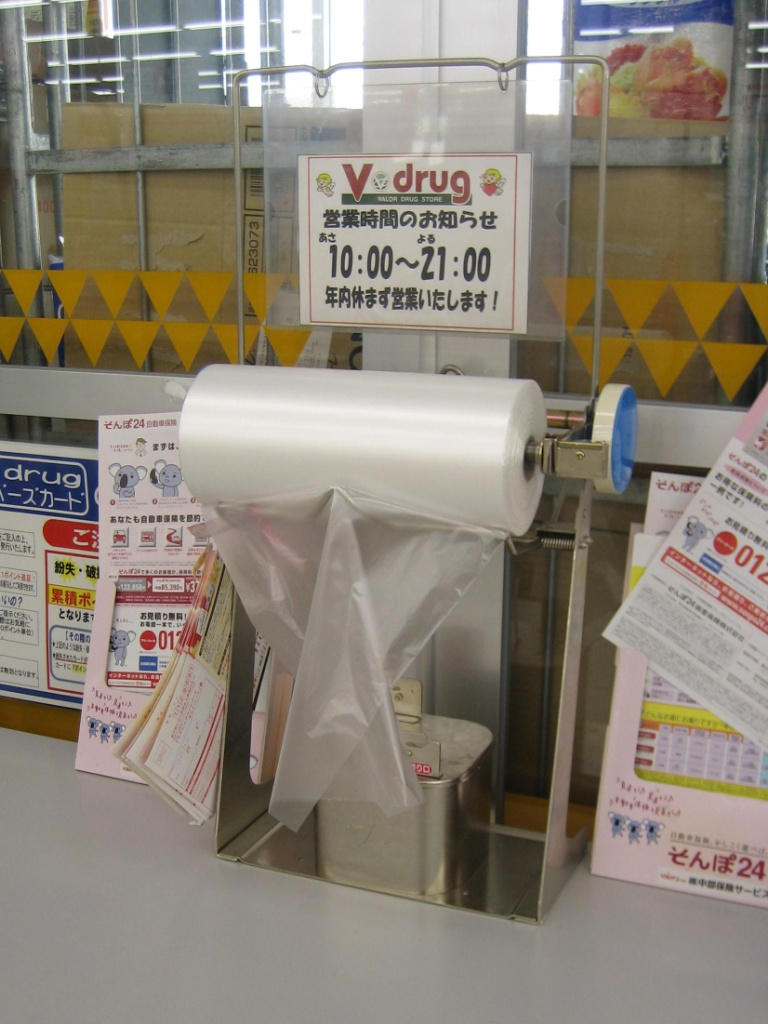
Self bagging area in Japan

Bagger, packer, sacker or bag boy (US) is an unofficial title given to a courtesy clerk at a grocery store.

== Job profile ==
The primary duties of a bagger revolve around putting groceries into a shopping bag and then into a shopping cart. Upon requests, baggers may take the groceries out to a customer's motor vehicle or supply other forms of service. Some baggers in stores will do this unless the customer refuses and wishes to bring their own groceries out. Depending on store policy, it may be customary to tip a courtesy clerk for this service.

Depending on the store, other duties may include:

- Performing cash pickups on registers, counting tills, balancing the cash office, researching cash discrepancies, detecting wire transfer fraud, filing wire transfer reports, managing, reviewing and maintaining wire transfer records, performing cash drops, researching customer transactions, ordering supplies, balancing lottery;
- Performing time clock overrides, contacting and following up with customers regarding complaints and/or concerns, logging in-store safety and/or policy violations, performing routine maintenance on cash registers, lottery machines and computers, loading and picking up cash in self-checkouts, performing self-checkout scan overrides, taking customer complements/complaints, organizing and distributing prizes for customer complements;
- Conducting various customer transactions including but not limited to refunds, lottery, purchases, wire transfers, dry-cleaning, bus ticket sales, payroll check cashing, taking and redirecting all in-store phone calls, employee training, conducting cash office, accounting and lottery audits, giving customer assistance, putting back items left behind, and reorganizing products on aisles to make a neater appearance (commonly called "breaking down", "blocking", "facing", or "conditioning").

Some courtesy clerks can perform maintenance in the stores, such as minor plumbing, electrical, landscaping, child care, elderly assistance, and many more jobs. The duties vary vastly depending on the store and union regulations, and some of the previous duties, in fact, are actually prohibited from being done at some stores by a courtesy clerk due to union contracts.

== Etymology ==
The title of bagger is the result of an extensive evolution of the position of courtesy clerk. The title bag boy was adopted for some time, until it was finally shortened to bagger.

== Availability ==
The position of baggers is particularly widespread in grocery stores in the United States. There are volunteer baggers in Mexico who primarily offer services for tips.

Other countries never adopted this service. There are no baggers in Norway. In Germany, self-service is standard and shopping carts are also used to load one’s vehicle oneself, without necessarily transferring goods to a bag first, with the American branch of Aldi also utilizing this type of non-bagging service to reduce overall store costs (though bags are sold in stores to account for customers loading their own bags in the dedicated bagging section in front of the store after checkout).

Convenience stores usually do not employ baggers. The customer frequency is too low. Instead, cashiers may perform the duties of a bagger (provided the purchase volume is significant enough). In territories prohibiting alcohol consumption in public, liquor stores bag individual bottles at the checkout.

== See also ==
- Checkout divider
- Right to sit
