= Checkout divider =

Sign for separating different customer's items

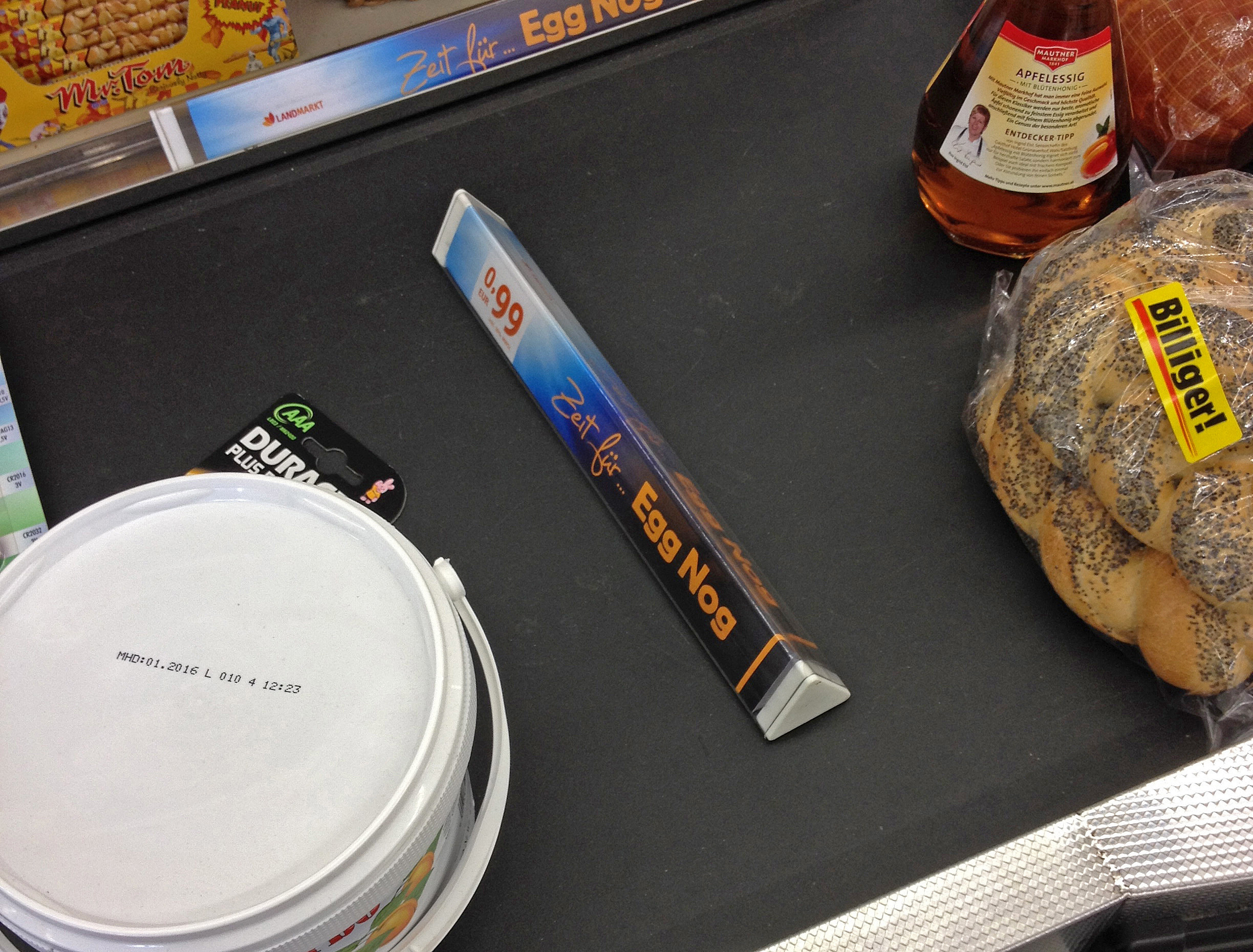
Checkout divider decorated with advertising

A checkout divider is a small sign or bar meant for placement between items on a conveyor belt at a checkout in a supermarket or other retail store. Its purpose is to separate one customer’s items from another’s.

Checkout dividers are usually next to the conveyor belt on the side where the cashier is sitting or standing. Most checkout dividers display the store's name or some advertising.

Checkout dividers have been the subject of numerous internet debates, mainly regarding who is responsible for placing the checkout dividers.

== See also ==
- Bagger
