= Belt Pulley =

American agricultural equipment magazine

Belt Pulley was a U.S.-based magazine dedicated to antique farm tractors of all brands and makes. It published successfully for over 2 decades and was one of the best known titles in the category. It was a family business run first by the Aumann family and then by the Elmore family. In 2009 it was sold, and the new owner eventually changed the name of the publication to Vintage Tractor Digest. This ended its publication under the Belt Pulley title.

== History and profile ==
Belt Pulley magazine was founded in 1987 by Kurt Aumann of Nokomis, Illinois. Aumann was only 17 years of age when he first started publishing the magazine. In 1998, Jane Aumann took over primary responsibility for the editing of the magazine as Kurt sought to build his auctioneering business called Aumann Auctions Inc.

In January 2003, Kurt sold his interest in Belt Pulley magazine to Chad and Katie Elmore of Jefferson, Wisconsin. The Elmores published the magazine for 6 more years. In 2009 they sold it Brandon Pfeiffer of Indiana who in turn sold the publication, which was by then called "Vintage Tractor Digest" to Brenda Stant of Outrange Farm Publications Inc, Bethlehem, Maryland.

== Context of publication: the antique tractor restoration hobby ==
Although there have been local threshing shows throughout the midwestern United States for many years, the hobby of collecting and restoring old farm machinery began to boom in the 1980s. Organizations of collectors were formed and began to host annual shows for the public. As a result, public interest in old farm tractors and farm machinery grew phenomenally. One such organization that grew tremendously in the 1980s was the LeSueur County Pioneer Power Association of LeSueur, Minnesota. The interests of individual collectors naturally seemed to crystallize around particular makes of farm tractor, and clubs were formed by collectors of particular brands of tractor manufacturers. The Massey-Harris collectors, the John Deere collectors, and the International Harvester collectors each had their own national organization and newsletter. Accordingly, the magazine called Wild Harvest was dedicated to Massey-Harris tractors and farm machinery, Green magazine and Two Cylinder magazine were dedicated to John Deere tractors and Red Power was dedicated to International Harvester farm machinery. Because of the need for sufficient members to sustain a viable organization, these antique farm equipment organizations and their respective magazines, were limited only to the products of those farm equipment companies which happened to make farm tractors and, indeed, were further limited to only the major farm tractor manufacturing companies. Overlooked in the literature of the antique farm equipment literature were all the machines made by the various "short line" companies like the New Holland Machine Company of New Holland, Pennsylvania, the New Idea Spreader Company of Coldwater, Ohio, and the David Bradley Company of Bradley, Illinois. (Belt Pully's 4 issue article on The History of The David Bradley Company and Works of Bradley Illinois is the best researched history known.) No formal organizations ever existed for those tractors manufactured by the many smaller companies. Into this environment was born the Belt Pulley magazine, with its professed goal, of being dedicated to "all brands of antique farm tractors."

== Belt Pulley reporters, contributors, and correspondents ==
In the first few issues of the Belt Pulley magazine, Kurt Aumann wrote nearly all the articles contained in each issue. If any inclination toward any one brand of tractor or any one antique farm collectors organization could be perceived in the new publication, it would be an inclination toward the products of the Oliver Farm Equipment Company. This was a reflection of the close relationship that Kurt Aumann had developed with individual members of the Hart-Parr/Oliver Collectors Association. Nonetheless, the magazine sought to cover the history and the technical data of all makes and brands of antique farm tractors and farm equipment. Toward this end, the magazine announced its intention of establishing a network of the reporters from around the nation to contribute articles. Originally, the writers or contributors to Belt Pulley magazine were called "Reporters." An early list of Reporters for the Belt Pulley magazine included Ed Westen of Kewaunee, Wisconsin, Jerry Engstrom of Fargo, North Dakota; Richard LaRusso of New Milford, Connecticut; Robert Oliphant of Waterford, Virginia; David Grube of Ringold, Pennsylvania; and Loran Ellingson of Northwood, North Dakota. In 1989, Kevin Talley of Vermillion, South Dakota and Sam Meeker of North Henderson, Illinois were added as reporters. The reporters attended antique tractor shows across the nation and submitted "show reports" to the magazine on the shows they had attended. Humorous reminiscences from Walter M. Buescher, a retired Allis-Chalmers salesman and manager, were featured in a Belt Pulley column for several years.

=== Ed Westen ===
Ed Westen became a regular contributor of articles to the Belt Pulley magazine, such as an article on Pioneer Village in Minden, Nebraska, a two-part series of articles on the restoration of his own Huber Model HK tractor, and an article on the Minneapolis-Moline Model D "Universal" tractor. In the May/June 1992 issue of Belt Pulley magazine, Ed Westen began the column called "The Good Ol' Days" with which Ed's name became most commonly identified.

=== Dr. Walter "Chick" Bishop ===
Dr. Walter "Chick" Bishop is a retired educator living near Litchfield, Illinois. Dr. Bishop has contributed a regularly to the Belt Pulley magazine and was credited as the magazine's first and only "staff writer." In an article published in the November/December 1987 issue of Belt Pulley entitled "Why To Restore" Dr. Bishop attempted to answer the question posed in the title of the article. In the course of the article, he outlined a short history of the antique tractor collection and restoration hobby. This article lead Dr. Bishop to an article on the settlers of the Corn Belt breaking the sod with the first steel plow made by John Deere. This article, in turn, led Dr. Bishop into a series of articles on John Deere tractors and farm machinery, which included the Waterloo Boy tractor, the "John Deere" Model D tractor, the "John Deere" Model A tractor, the "John Deere" Model B tractor, the "John Deere" Model H and Model M tractors. Bishop closed out the series of articles on Deere and Company with an "Overview" of the company.

=== Brian Wayne Wells ===
The longest serving and most prolific writer for the Belt Pulley magazine is Brian Wayne Wells, currently, of Winfield, West Virginia. Starting with the March/April 1994 issue of Belt Pulley, he has contributed an article to every issue of the magazine since that time and has continued to do so down to the present time. His first article carried in that March/April 1994 issue was actually a legal article on the Freedom of Information legislation of the states of Iowa and Wisconsin. As a practising attorney with membership in the bars of Mississippi, Minnesota and West Virginia, Brian was asked by Editor in Chief, Kurt Aumann to write the article, called "Researcher's Rights" and outlines the proposition that the materials held by various publicly funded archives and libraries is actually the property of the public at large and, thus, the property of the individual researcher. The article points out that restrictions of the use of the content and or copies of these public documents by librarians are not legal restrictions.

Since that first article, every other article written by Brian Wayne Wells and Monique Carr has dealt with farming subjects of the past.

Generally, his articles fall into three different categories

1. the history of a particular antique tractor (like the article on the 1938 F-20 owned by Robert Westfall);
2. the history of a farm equipment company (like the articles on the history of the New Idea Spreader Company of Coldwater, Ohio, the article on the history of the Algoma Foundry and Manufacturing Company of Algoma, Wisconsin and the article on the David Bradley company of Kankakee, Illinois); and
3. articles which describe the various type of farming conducted around the country (like the article on Sheep Herding in Wyoming," "Dry Land Farming in Wyoming," and "Navy Bean Faring in Huron County, Michigan.)

== See also ==
- List of steam fairs - were vintage & classic tractors and machinery are often on display (in the UK)
