= Intralox =

American conveyor belt manufacturer

Intralox, LLC
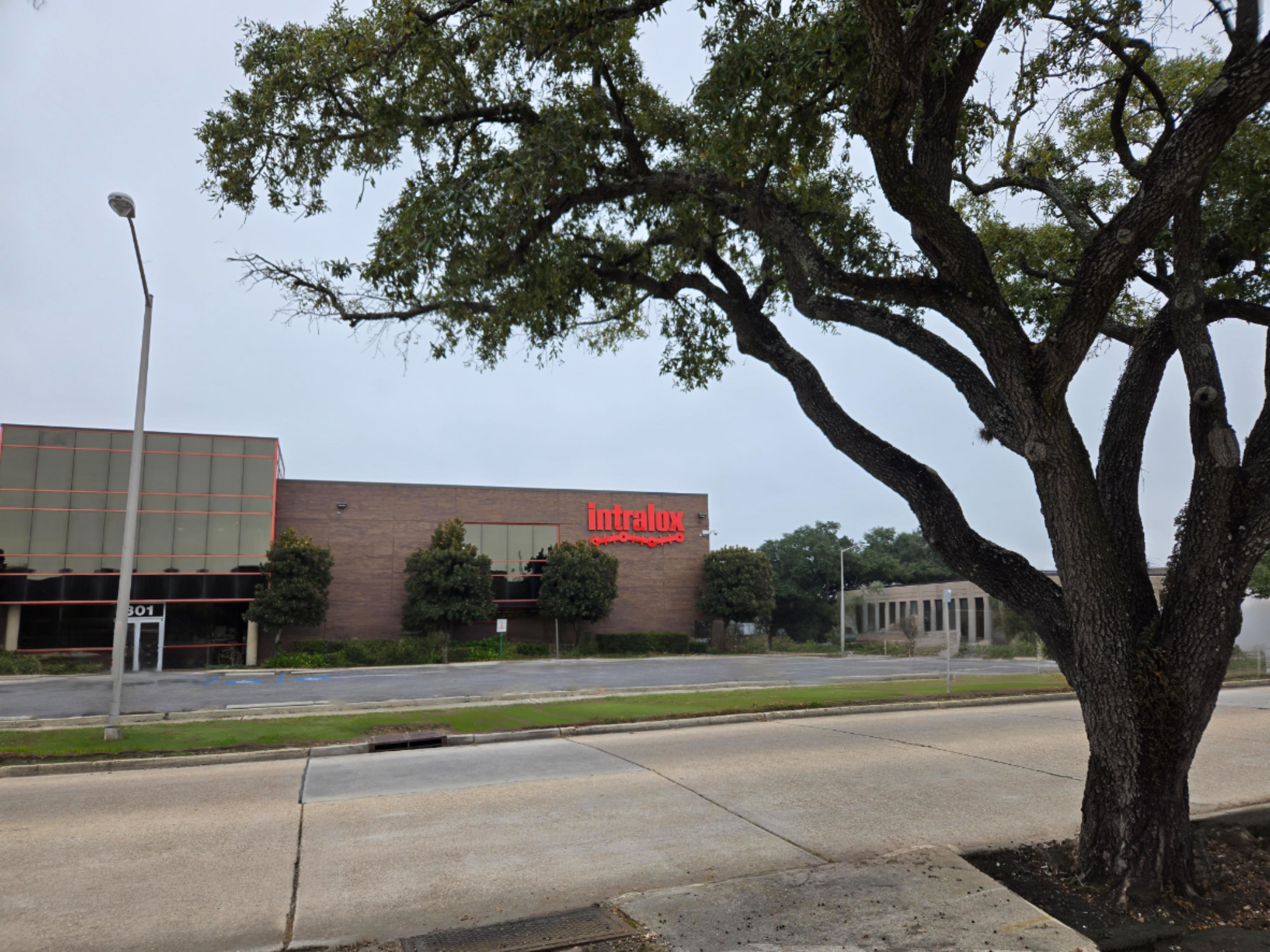
- Intralox, LLC, USA, Corporate Headquarters
- Type: Private
- Industry: Conveying solutions
- Founder: J. M. Lapeyre
- Headquarters: Harahan, LA, US
- Number of employees: 2500
- Parent: Laitram, LLC
- Website: Intralox.com

Intralox, headquartered in the New Orleans, Louisiana, suburb of Harahan is a manufacturer of conveyor belts. Intralox specializes in modular plastic conveyor belts and related services and equipment.

Intralox is the largest division of Laitram, LLC, and has regional headquarters in Amsterdam and Shanghai and assembly centers located around the globe. Intralox's products and services are used in general food processing, meat, poultry and seafood processing, beverage handling, can manufacturing, baking, case and box handling, and packaging.

== History ==
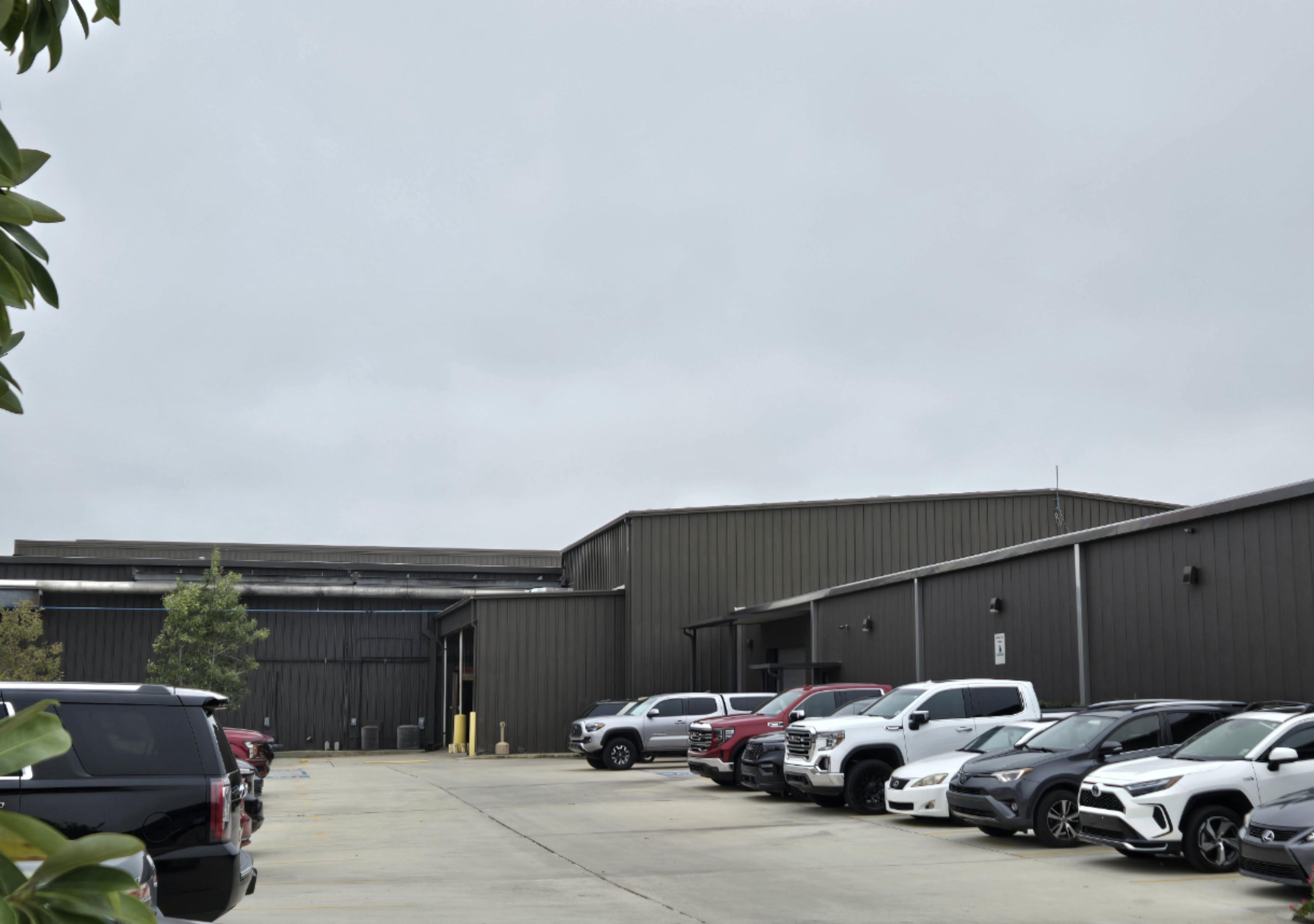
Intralox, LLC, USA, Original Corporate Headquarters Building

In 1949, Intralox founder J. M. Lapeyre invented an automatic shrimp-peeling machine that changed the industry. He patented his shrimp peeler and 190 other inventions during his lifetime. He also founded multiple companies under parent company, Laitram, LLC, including Laitram Machinery, Intralox, Lapeyre Stair, and Laitram Machine Shop — all based on his inventions.

Intralox registered the first patent for modular plastic belting in 1970 and has been the first company to introduce many of the conveying concepts in the market today and currently holds more than 490 active patents worldwide.

== Recognition ==
- Intralox ARB Conveyance Technology Acclaimed for Handling New, Greener Beverage Packages with Ease
- Special Recognition for International Trade Efforts
- NSF Food Safety Leadership Award 2010
- 2009 China Food Safety Provider Award: Intralox EZ Clean Family of Hygienic Solutions
- European Anuga FoodTec Award 2009: Intralox ARB Technology and Hygienic Solutions
