= Conveyor pulley =

A conveyor pulley is a mechanical device used to change the direction of the belt in a conveyor system, to drive the belt, and to tension the belt. Modern pulleys are made of rolled shells with flexible end disks and locking assemblies. Early pulley engineering was developed in Australia by Josef Sitzwohl in 1948 and later by Helmuth Lange and Walter Schmoltzi in Germany.

== See also ==
- Flexible shaft
