= Louisiana Highway 45 =

State highway in Louisiana, United States

Louisiana Highway 45

- Route of LA 45 highlighted in red

Route information
- Maintained by Louisiana DOTD
- Length: 22.081 mi (35.536 km)
- Existed: 1955 renumbering–present

Major junctions
- South end: Dead end at Bayou Barataria in Lafitte
- LA 3134 in Jean Lafitte; LA 3134 in Estelle; US 90 Bus. / I-910 / Future I-49 in Marrero
- North end: LA 18 in Marrero

Location
- Country: United States
- State: Louisiana
- Parishes: Jefferson

Highway system
- Louisiana State Highway System; Interstate; US; State; Scenic
← LA 44	→ LA 46

Louisiana Highway 45 (LA 45) is a state highway located in Jefferson Parish, Louisiana. It runs 22.08 miles (35.53 km) in a north–south direction from a dead end at Bayou Barataria in Lafitte to a junction with LA 18 in Marrero.

The route connects Marrero, an unincorporated suburb of New Orleans, with several small communities located along Bayou Barataria, including the town of Jean Lafitte. It also provides access to the Barataria Unit of the Jean Lafitte National Historical Park and Preserve, a protected area of environmental and cultural significance which, among its many functions, features walking trails through its vast swamps and marshes.

Roughly halfway along its route, LA 45 and LA 3134 share a high-level bridge across a section of Bayou Barataria that serves as a link in the Gulf Intracoastal Waterway. Near its northern terminus, LA 45 has an interchange with U.S. Highway 90 Business (US 90 Bus.), an elevated freeway traversing the communities of Jefferson Parish located on the west bank of the Mississippi River.

LA 45 was designated in the 1955 Louisiana Highway renumbering from a portion of former State Route 30. Around 1980, a nine-mile (14 km) section of the route between Crown Point and Estelle was bypassed for through traffic in favor of the newly constructed LA 3134 (Leo Kerner/Lafitte Parkway, originally Lafitte-Larose Highway). In the future, most of this mileage is proposed to be eliminated from the state highway system by the Louisiana Department of Transportation and Development (La DOTD).

== Route description ==
=== Lafitte to Crown Point ===
From the south, LA 45 begins at a dead end at the east bank of Bayou Barataria in the unincorporated community of Lafitte. It follows Jean Lafitte Boulevard, an undivided two-lane highway that travels east for two blocks before turning north parallel to the bayou. Over the next 2.7 miles (4.3 km), the roadway is flanked by small residences and boathouses lining Bayou Barataria on the west and a large body of water known as "The Pen" on the east. North of Lafitte, LA 45 crosses a movable bridge over Bayou Des Oies and continues for about 2.5 miles (4.0 km) into the town of Jean Lafitte. Here, the highway intersects LA 302 (Fisherman Boulevard), a short connector that provides access to LA 3257 (Privateer Boulevard) on the opposite bank of the bayou. This junction is located near a cluster of many of the town's important facilities, such as the town hall, post office, library branch, and public schools.

LA 45 proceeds along Jean Lafitte Boulevard as the road curves east with a section of Bayou Barataria that serves as a link in the Gulf Intracoastal Waterway. 2.3 miles (3.7 km) later, LA 45 reaches a junction located beside the high-level Wagner Bridge spanning the waterway. From this junction, LA 303 begins and proceeds ahead on Jean Lafitte Boulevard as LA 45 turns south onto the bridge's south approach ramp concurrent with LA 3134. A median divides the two lanes of traffic as the ramp makes a long loop back the north, and the highway ascends onto the Wagner Bridge, reaching a height of 72 feet (22 m) above the Gulf Intracoastal Waterway. Returning to grade, the highway widens to four lanes and becomes known as the Leo Kerner/Lafitte Parkway. After a short distance, LA 45 departs from this alignment as it turns onto a ramp leading back toward Bayou Barataria. Through traffic bound for the New Orleans area continues straight ahead on LA 3134 (Leo Kerner/Lafitte Parkway) toward Marrero.

=== Crown Point to Marrero ===
At the foot of the ramp, LA 45 turns northeast onto Barataria Boulevard and crosses underneath the Wagner Bridge, continuing the route of LA 301 along the west bank of Bayou Barataria. Returning to an undivided two-lane highway once again, LA 45 enters the small community of Crown Point. The highway turns northwest at an intersection with LA 560-4 (Sharpe Road) to follow the smaller Bayou Des Familles. Soon afterward, LA 45 crosses LA 3134 at a point located only 0.3 miles (0.48 km) north of their previous junction. The surroundings become abruptly uninhabited as LA 45 enters the thickly wooded terrain of the Jean Lafitte National Historical Park and Preserve. About 1.5 miles (2.4 km) beyond the junction with LA 3134, the highway passes the park's visitor center, which provides access to its many nature trails and other facilities. LA 45 continues northward on Barataria Boulevard through the preserve for another two miles (3.2 km), at which point the highway passes through a floodwall and into a suburban area known as Estelle.

After curving to the northeast, LA 45 widens to a divided six-lane highway and reaches its fourth and final junction with LA 3134 at the latter's northern terminus. LA 45 continues into the heavily populated suburban community of Marrero and intersects Lapalco Boulevard, a busy commercial thoroughfare. Continuing north, LA 45 passes Archbishop Shaw High School and the historic Hope Haven and Madonna Manor. Immediately beyond these complexes, LA 45 intersects US 90 Bus. (Westbank Expressway) at Exit 4B. This elevated urban expressway with grade-level service roads connects to New Orleans on the east bank of the Mississippi River, as well the nearby west bank cities of Gretna and Westwego. LA 45 continues a short distance further to a T-intersection with LA 18 at 4th Street, a few blocks short of reaching the River Road.

=== Route classification and data ===
LA 45 is classified by the Louisiana Department of Transportation and Development (La DOTD) as a rural major collector between Lafitte and Crown Point. The remainder of the route varies from a rural minor collector through Jean Lafitte National Historical Park and Preserve to an urban principal arterial between Estelle and Marrero. Daily traffic volume in 2013 peaked at 41,400 vehicles in Marrero near the US 90 Bus. interchange. South of Marrero, the route generally averaged less than 7,000 vehicles per day with a low of 560 reported over the Crown Point loop. The posted speed limit is generally 55 mph (90 km/h) in rural areas, reduced to 35 mph (55 km/h) in most populated areas.

== History ==
=== Pre-1955 route numbering ===
In the original Louisiana Highway system in use between 1921 and 1955, LA 45 was part of State Route 30. Route 30 followed the west bank of the Mississippi River from Algiers north to Lettsworth in Pointe Coupee Parish. From there, it took a more westerly path across the Atchafalaya River at Simmesport and proceeded to a terminus at US 71 in Bunkie. Much of this route is followed by LA 1 and LA 18 today. The modern LA 45 was formerly a portion of Route 30 that, due to an anomaly in its original legislative route description, extended southward off of the main route at Marrero. It followed what was then known as the "Barataria Road" alongside Bayous Des Familles and Barataria to the fishing community of Lafitte. The other, shorter branch of Route 30 continued downriver from Marrero through Gretna to the Algiers Ferry landing and became Route 30-D around 1940.

The Barataria Road was graveled in 1927, and it was almost entirely paved in 1939. The alignment remained virtually the same during the pre-1955 era, although road maps of the 1920s and 1930s showed two differences that most likely never existed and were later corrected. Until the early 1930s, the Barataria Road branch of Route 30 was often shown to connect with the main branch of the highway at Westwego rather than Marrero. It was also shown to bypass Crown Point, then known as Peach Orchard, by following a cutoff similar to, but west of, the present LA 3134. This route is even shown as an existing gravel roadway on the Louisiana Highway Commission's departmental maps of the early 1930s and duplicated in the commercial road maps of the era. However, contemporary cartography by the United States Geological Survey shows no such road existing, and it disappeared from the above maps by the end of the decade in favor of the familiar alignment.

In the pre-1955 era, two extensions were proposed that would have continued from Route 30 south of Lafitte. Both were given new highway numbers, as was common practice by the Louisiana Highway Commission at this time. The first was Route 428, designated in 1928, which would have traveled due south across the wetlands to Grand Isle, a small community in lower Jefferson Parish. The other was Route 1255, designated in 1930, which would have traveled southwest along the Gulf Intracoastal Waterway over similar terrain to Larose in neighboring Lafourche Parish. Both routes would have provided Jefferson Parish with shortcuts to various points near the Gulf of Mexico, but neither of these ambitious projects ever came to fruition.

=== Post-1955 route history ===
LA 45 was created in the 1955 Louisiana Highway renumbering, replacing the branch of Route 30 between Marrero and Lafitte.

La 45—From a point near Bayou Rigolets through or near Lafitte and Crown Point to a junction with La 18 at or near Marrero.

— 1955 legislative route description

Since that time, a large section of the route between the Gulf Intracoastal Waterway and Estelle has been bypassed for through traffic in favor of LA 3134 (Leo Kerner/Lafitte Parkway). This highway was constructed during the late 1970s on a new four-lane alignment running parallel to LA 45 and cutting across several of its curves. It was intended as the first link in the Lafitte-Larose Highway, a project that had been planned since at least 1930. A major element of the project was the construction of a high-level bridge spanning the Gulf Intracoastal Waterway at Crown Point. The new Wagner Bridge was completed in 1976, replacing the original swing bridge of the same name on LA 45 just downstream. LA 45 shares the bridge with LA 3134, which was never completed beyond the southern approach.

== Future ==
La DOTD is currently engaged in a program that aims to transfer about 5,000 miles (8,000 km) of state-owned roadways to local governments over the next several years. Under this plan of "right-sizing" the state highway system, nearly all portions of LA 45 bypassed by LA 3134 are proposed for deletion as they no longer perform a significant interurban travel function. The sole exception is a small portion connecting LA 3134 near Crown Point to the visitor center entrance of the Jean Lafitte National Historical Park and Preserve.

== Major intersections ==
The entire highway is in Jefferson Parish.

Location	mi	km	Destinations	Notes
Lafitte	0.000	0.000	Dead end at Bayou Barataria	Southern terminus
Lafitte	1.898– 1.954	3.055– 3.145	Bridge over Bayou Des Oies	
Jean Lafitte	5.379	8.657	LA 302 (Fisherman Boulevard) to LA 3257 (Privateer Boulevard)	Eastern terminus of LA 302
Jean Lafitte	8.949– 8.956	14.402– 14.413	LA 303 (Jean Lafitte Boulevard); LA 3134	Western terminus of LA 303; southern terminus of LA 3134; south end of LA 3134 concurrency
Jean Lafitte	Begin 1.735-mile (2.792 km) segment of 2.045-mile-long (3.291 km) concurrency with LA 3134 not counted in LA 45 route mileage			
Jean Lafitte	0.860– 1.741	1.384– 2.802	Wagner Bridge over Gulf Intracoastal Waterway / Bayou Barataria	
Resume LA 45 route mileage on north end of Wagner Bridge
	9.266	14.912	LA 3134 north (Leo Kerner/Lafitte Parkway) – New Orleans	North end of LA 3134 concurrency
	9.889	15.915	LA 301 (Barataria Boulevard)	Northern terminus of LA 301
Crown Point	10.931	17.592	LA 560-4 (Sharpe Road)	Northern terminus of LA 560-4
	11.868– 11.956	19.100– 19.241	LA 3134 (Leo Kerner/Lafitte Parkway) – Lafitte, New Orleans	
Estelle	18.851– 18.916	30.338– 30.442	LA 3134 south (Leo Kerner/Lafitte Parkway) – Crown Point, Lafitte	Northern terminus of LA 3134; to Jean Lafitte National Historical Park and Preserve (Barataria Preserve)
Marrero	21.756– 21.801	35.013– 35.085	US 90 Bus. (Westbank Expressway) / I-910 – Westwego, Gretna, Algiers	Exit 4B on US 90 Bus.; I-910 unsigned
Marrero	22.081	35.536	LA 18 (Barataria Boulevard, 4th Street)	Northern terminus
1.000 mi = 1.609 km; 1.000 km = 0.621 mi: Concurrency terminus
