= Louisiana Highway 560 =

State highway in Louisiana, United States

Louisiana Highway 560

Route information
- Maintained by Louisiana DOTD
- Existed: 1955 renumbering–present

Location
- Country: United States
- State: Louisiana
- Parishes: Jefferson

Highway system
- Louisiana State Highway System; Interstate; US; State; Scenic
← LA 559	→ LA 561

Louisiana Highway 560 (LA 560) is a collection of two current and two former state-maintained streets in Marrero and Crown Point, Jefferson Parish. All four routes were established with the 1955 Louisiana Highway renumbering.

== Current routes ==
=== Louisiana Highway 560-2 ===
Louisiana Highway 560-2
- Location: Marrero
- Length: 0.17 mi (270 m)
- Existed: 1955–present

From the south, LA 560-2 begins at an intersection with LA 18 (4th Street to the east/Barataria Boulevard to the south). It continues northward along Barataria Boulevard to a terminus at LA 541 (River Road).

The entire highway is in Marrero, Jefferson Parish.

mi	km	Destinations	Notes
0.00	0.00	LA 18 (Barataria Boulevard, 4th Street)	Southern terminus
0.17	0.27	LA 541 (River Road)	Northern terminus
1.000 mi = 1.609 km; 1.000 km = 0.621 mi

=== Louisiana Highway 560-4 ===
Louisiana Highway 560-4
- Location: Crown Point
- Length: 0.85 mi (1,370 m)
- Existed: 1955–present

From the southwest, LA 560-4 begins at a dead-end east of the LA 45/LA 3134 (Leo Kerner/Lafitte Parkway, formerly Lafitte-Larose Highway) bridge over Bayou Barataria at Crown Point (near Jean Lafitte). It heads northeast on Sharpe Road along the north bank of the bayou before turning northwest to a terminus at LA 45 (Barataria Boulevard).

LA 560-4 was known as State Route 1306 in the pre-1955 Louisiana highway system.

The entire highway is in Crown Point, Jefferson Parish.

mi	km	Destinations	Notes
0.00	0.00	Dead end east of LA 45 / LA 3134 (Leo Kerner/Lafitte Parkway)	Southwestern terminus
0.85	1.37	LA 45 (Barataria Boulevard)	Northeastern terminus
1.000 mi = 1.609 km; 1.000 km = 0.621 mi

== Former routes ==
=== Louisiana Highway 560-1 ===
Louisiana Highway 560-1
- Location: Marrero
- Length: 0.17 mi (270 m)
- Existed: 1955–2010

From the south, LA 560-1 began at a dead-end on the north side of the New Orleans and Gulf Coast Railroad tracks. It continued northward on Distillery Lane along the border between Marrero and Harvey to a terminus at LA 541 (River Road).

LA 560-1 originally began at an intersection LA 18 (4th Street). In 2001, it was truncated north of the railroad tracks to allow for remote control operation of locomotives servicing the Kinder Morgan plant. The route became a dead-end, accessing only gates of the industrial plant on both sides of the road. It was deleted altogether in 2010.

The entire highway was in Marrero, Jefferson Parish.

mi	km	Destinations	Notes
0.00	0.00	Dead end north of New Orleans and Gulf Coast Railroad tracks	Southern terminus
0.17	0.27	LA 541 (River Road)	Northern terminus
1.000 mi = 1.609 km; 1.000 km = 0.621 mi

=== Louisiana Highway 560-3 ===
Louisiana Highway 560-3
- Location: Marrero
- Length: 0.71 mi (1,140 m)
- Existed: 1955–2010

From the southwest, LA 560-3 began at an intersection with LA 45 (Barataria Boulevard) just south of the latter's northern terminus at LA 18. It continued eastward along 7th Street before turning northward along Avenue B to a terminus at LA 18 (4th Street). The route was deleted in 2010.

The entire highway was in Marrero, Jefferson Parish.

mi	km	Destinations	Notes
0.00	0.00	LA 45 (Barataria Boulevard)	Southwestern terminus
0.71	1.14	LA 18 (4th Street)	Northeastern terminus
1.000 mi = 1.609 km; 1.000 km = 0.621 mi
