= Louisiana Highway 3134 =

State highway in Louisiana, United States

Louisiana Highway 3134
- Leo Kerner/Lafitte Parkway
- LA 3134 highlighted in red

Route information
- Maintained by Louisiana DOTD
- Length: 7.2 mi (11.6 km)
- Existed: c. 1976–present

Major junctions
- South end: LA 45 in Jean Lafitte
- LA 45 in Crown Point
- North end: LA 45 in Estelle

Location
- Country: United States
- State: Louisiana
- Parishes: Jefferson

Highway system
- Louisiana State Highway System; Interstate; US; State; Scenic
← LA 3132	→ LA 3136

Louisiana Highway 3134 (LA 3134) is a state highway in Louisiana that serves Jefferson Parish. It spans 7.2 miles (11.6 km) in a north-south direction along Leo Kerner/Lafitte Parkway between Jean Lafitte and Estelle (south of Marrero) and acts as a four-lane bypass to the older Barataria Boulevard (LA 45).

== Route description ==
From the south, LA 3134 begins at an unfinished interchange with LA 45 in Jean Lafitte. It proceeds northward as a two-lane, undivided highway co-signed with LA 45 and crosses a bridge over Bayou Barataria/Gulf Intracoastal Waterway.

Reaching the north side of the bayou at Crown Point, the route widens to four lanes divided, and LA 45 splits to the west. LA 3134 continues north, intersecting LA 45 again and crossing Bayou des Familles. LA 3134 proceeds north to a terminus at LA 45 just south of Marrero in an area known as Estelle.

== History ==
Until recently, the route was known as Lafitte-Larose Highway as it was originally projected to extend southwest from its present terminus to Larose roughly along the Gulf Intracoastal Waterway. This extension was never constructed, and the highway is now signed as Leo Kerner/Lafitte Parkway.

As early as 1934, planners considered the idea of constructing a road between Lafitte and Larose that would shorten the route to Grand Isle by 26 miles. The project was jointly proposed by the Jefferson Parish Police Jury and the "good roads bureau" of the Association of Commerce. It was to be nominated to the federal Civil Works Administration if approved through public meetings. In this initial concept, the new highway would be constructed on the bank of the new Intracoastal Waterway using the dredge material as the initial foundation. In the 1960s, it was proposed to connect the town of Larose, in Lafourche Parish, with the southern end of Marrero at LA 45. The proposed 28-mile highway was to be designed as a four-lane divided facility, initially established with two lanes. Starting at a point on LA 308 approximately 2 miles south of Larose, the highway was proposed to follow the Intracoastal Waterway eastward, crossing over Bayou Pirot, and reaching Barataria island in Jefferson Parish, a distance of approximately 20.5 miles. At Barataria, it was to cross Bayou Barataria near Kerner's Ferry Bridge and then continue through Lafitte towards Crown Point, where it would then cross the Intracoastal Waterway approximately at the location of the Wagner's Ferry Bridge, 3 miles from Barataria. From this new bridge, the route was to continue on a relatively straight northerly path and terminate at Barataria Blvd (LA 45) approximately 1,500 feet from Ames Blvd.

Planning was completed and an environmental impact statement was filed for review and approval by the Louisiana Department of Highways (currently the Louisiana Department of Transportation and Development). According to the statement, the project's main purpose was to, "relocate and eliminate the hazardous condition that exists on LA 45 and also serve as a hurricane evacuation route." Once constructed, it would significantly reduce the travel time from Grand Isle to New Orleans, eliminating 30 miles from the next direct route by way of U.S. 90 through Raceland. A secondary purpose of the project was to replace the two swing bridges in the vicinity of Lafitte: Kerner's Ferry Bridge and Wagner's Ferry Bridge.

If constructed, the project would cover 1,018 acres of land area, which included 636 acres of marshland, 252 acres of swampland, and only 130 acres of residential or potentially residential land. Although 87% of the project area was classified as wetlands, the project was given environmental approval in 1972. At the time, the basis for approval was primarily through an economic cost-benefit analysis, which gave low economic value to wetlands.

The first portion of the highway was constructed from LA 45 in Marrero to the Intracoastal Canal at Crown Point, including a new high-rise bridge that replaced the previous Wagner's Ferry Bridge, which was located approximately 0.6 miles west of the new location. By 1976, the bridge was opened in advance of the highway. Ultimately, construction of this 5-mile portion was completed and opened to traffic in December 1980. The remainder of the project interconnecting Lafitte with Larose was never undertaken.

As a project, the Lafitte-Larose highway was a casualty of the progressively evolving public position and governmental policy regarding the environment. In response to deteriorating environmental conditions nationally, the United States Environmental Protection Agency was created under President Richard Nixon's administration in December 1970, when the project was well into planning and design. Though the project filed an Environmental Impact Statement for review in 1972, the EPA's position on wetlands was yet to evolve from the historic Swamp Land Acts of the mid-1800s, which considered swamp land to be more valuable if drained for development. Even after environmental review and approval, a strong faction of concerned citizens and environmental groups continued to protest the project. A lawsuit that was settled out of court, brought forth by the National Wildlife Federation, Louisiana Wildlife Federation, the Orleans Audubon Society and the Ecology Center of Louisiana, allowed for construction to proceed on the portion from Marrero to Crown Point, but required the remainder to be subject to a new environmental study along with public hearings. That same year, 1977, the Federal "Clean Water Act" (officially an amendment to the Federal Water Pollution Control Act of 1972) went into effect, changing the way that the EPA measured the value of wetlands. Because the Lafitte-Larose project had been delayed and then required new environmental reviews, it became increasingly difficult to gain approval for the portion that involved the majority of wetlands, marshes and swamps. It is also the case that suburban expansion of the previous decades, involving the draining and development of previously natural areas, coupled with several extreme weather events that resulted in massive flooding on the West Bank (May 3, 1978 and April 13, 1979), resulted in the greater valuation of wetlands as repositories for storm water runoff. Because the remainder of the project involved wetlands almost exclusively, it was never advanced beyond the Wagner Bridge.

== Major intersections ==
The entire highway is in Jefferson Parish.

Location	mi	km	Destinations	Notes
Jean Lafitte	0.0	0.0	LA 45 south – Lafitte	Southern terminus; South end of LA 45 concurrency
Jean Lafitte northern limit	0.7	1.1	Bridge over Bayou Barataria/Gulf Intracoastal Waterway	
Crown Point	1.4	2.3	LA 45 north (Barataria Boulevard)	North end of LA 45 concurrency
Crown Point	1.8	2.9	LA 45 (Barataria Boulevard)	
Crown Point	1.8	2.9	Bridge over Bayou des Familles	
Estelle	7.2	11.6	LA 45 (Barataria Boulevard)	Northern terminus
1.000 mi = 1.609 km; 1.000 km = 0.621 mi: Concurrency terminus
