= L. W. Higgins High School =

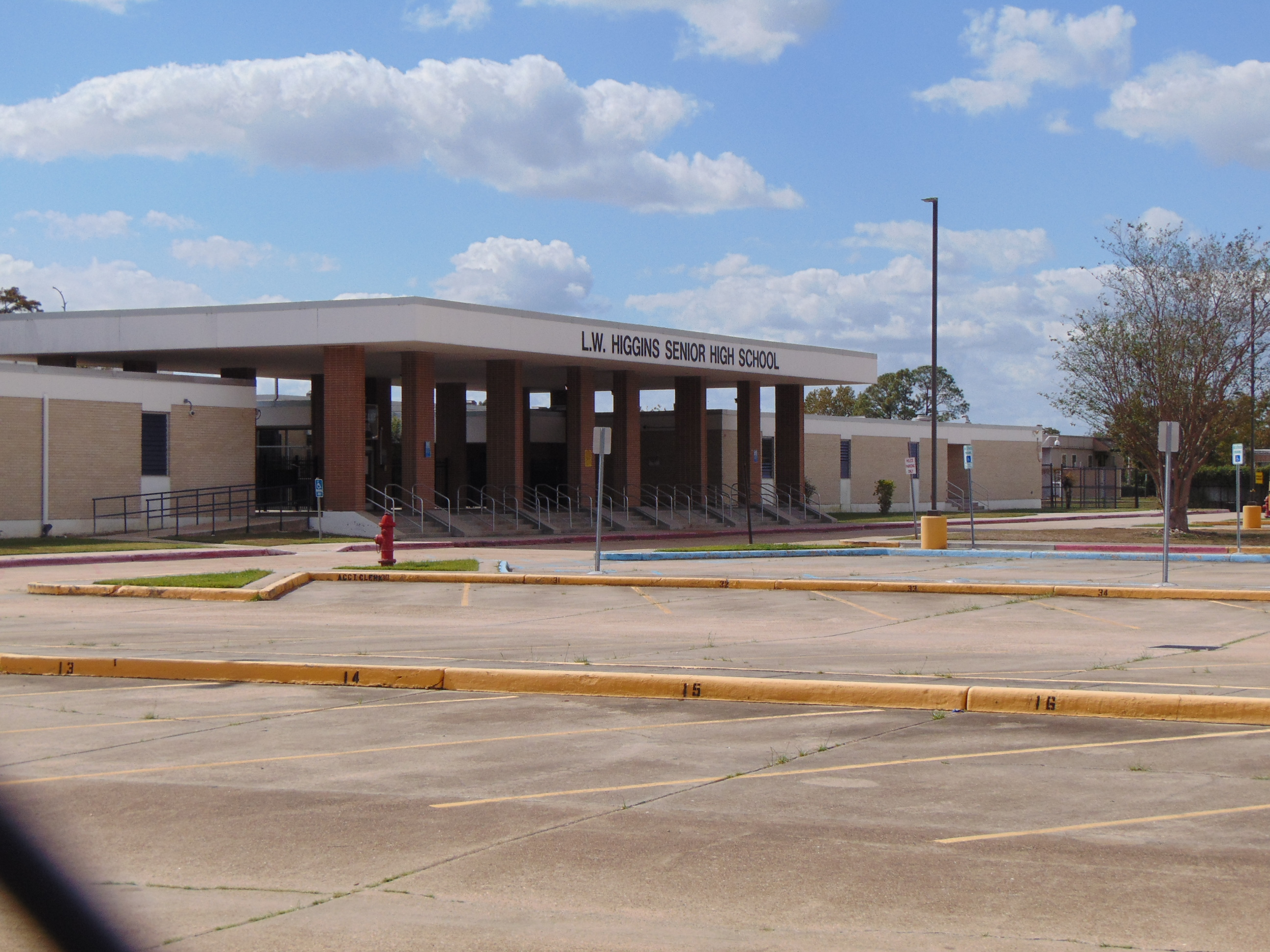

Location
- 7201 Lapalco Blvd; Marrero, Louisiana 70072; 29°53′0″N 90°7′45″W

Information
- Established: August 28, 1968; 58 years ago
- Principal: Duane Foret
- Staff: 70.86 (on an FTE basis)
- Enrollment: 1,197 (2023-24)
- Student to teacher ratio: 16.89
- Colors: Navy and gold
- Mascot: Hurricane
- Team name: Hurricanes
- Website: higgins.jpschools.org

L. W. Higgins High School is a high school in Marrero, a community in unincorporated Jefferson Parish, Louisiana, United States. It is a part of the Jefferson Parish Public School System.

The school serves several communities. Its service area includes all of Avondale, Bridge City, Waggaman, and Westwego. Its service area includes portions of Marrero, Harvey, and Estelle.

== Athletics ==
L. W. Higgins High athletics competes in the LHSAA.

=== Football ===
Coaches
Wayne Meyers compiled a 112–76 record in 18 seasons as Higgins coach during which time the Hurricanes won five district championships and advanced to the state playoffs 11 times during his final 14 seasons. Wayne Meyers directed the Hurricanes to 11 winning seasons that included two advances to the state quarterfinals in 2008 and 2003 and seven regional playoff appearances. The Hurricanes only had four losing seasons under Meyers with those coming in his first and final two seasons. On November 7, 2013, Wayne Meyers resigned as L. W. Higgins head football coach at the request of Principal David Lewis.

== Extracurricular activities ==
Higgins also has band, pep squad, flag team and diamond dancers dance team.

== Notable alumni ==
- Melvin Frazier, NBA Orlando Magic
- Skyler Green, former NFL player
- Nate Singleton, former NFL player
- Jason Williams, basketball player for Hapoel Be'er Sheva of the National Basketball League of Israel
