= Louis H. Marrero =

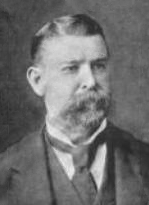
- Louis H. Marrero

United States Senator from Louisiana
- In office 1892–1896

Personal details
- Born: Louis Herman Marrero; August 17, 1847 Adams County, Mississippi
- Died: February 26, 1921 (aged 73) Marrero, Louisiana
- Party: Democratic
- Spouse: Elodie
- Profession: Soldier, politician, Chief of Police, Businessman, Banker and Landowner

Military service
- Allegiance: Confederate States of America
- Branch/service: Confederate States Army
- Years of service: 1862 - 1865

Louis Herman Marrero (July 17, 1847 – February 26, 1921) was a prominent American soldier, politician, businessman, banker, chief of police, and landowner. During his lifetime, he served in many political offices, such as governor of Saint Bernard Parish (1884–1896), Sheriff (1896), President of Jefferson Parish, Louisiana (1884–1916) and Louisiana state senator (1892–1896). He also served as the President of the Jefferson Commercial & Savings bank (in Gretna, Louisiana), and president of the Marrero Land and Improvement Association, Ltd.

== Biography ==
Louis H. Marrero was born on July 17, 1847, near Kingston, in Adams County, Mississippi. His father, Bastian A. Marrero, was born in St. Bernard Parish, Louisiana, while his mother, Anna Lydia (Swayze) Marrero, was born in Adams County, Mississippi. He was the eldest of five siblings. His siblings were Alonso, F. William, Eugene C. and Frank G. His paternal great-grandparents were Spanish settlers, Bartolomé Marrero and Josefa Sosa, who originated in the Canary Islands and arrived in Louisiana from Santa Cruz de Tenerife in October 15, 1778, with their daughters and other Canarian settlers. Settlers in Louisiana from the Canaries are known as Isleños. Louis H. Marrero mainly studied at the Potter Private School and the preparatory department of the Centenary College of Louisiana at Jackson.

When he was 15 years old, he enlisted in Company C, 25th Louisiana Infantry, and fought at the Battle of Farmington as well as the Second Battle of Corinth. He also fought alongside Bragg's army in the state of Kentucky, in Nashville and Murfreesboro, Tennessee (where he was wounded) and in Jackson, Mississippi. On November 25, 1863, he was captured and imprisoned at Rock Island, Illinois. He remained there until March 1865, when he was taken to Richmond and put on probation.

After the war ended, Louis H. Marrero was devoted to planting and marketing. Later, in 1867, he moved to St. Bernard Parish where he served as sheriff for many years. In 1881, he continued this job in the Jefferson Parish.

He was an active member in the Democratic party, being elected to several charges: the Police Jury of Jefferson Parish (1883–1896), serving as President (1884–1896), member of the Louisiana Senate (1892–1896), member of the Lafourche Parish Levee Board (1892–1896), Jefferson Parish Sheriff (1896-1920), and member of the Constitutional Convention of 1898. He also had many other occupations, most notably as president of the Jefferson Commercial & Savings bank, in Gretna, Louisiana, and as president of the Marrero Land and Improvement Association, Ltd.

During his administration in Jefferson Parish, he attracted companies to the region and founded stores devoted to the sale of agricultural products to benefit the local farmers.

Marrero served as the President of the Jefferson Commercial & Savings bank since its founding. Simultaneously he also served as the President of the Marrero Land and Improvement Association.

He died on Saturday, February 26, 1921, of "heart disease" at his home on Barataria Boulevard, in Marrero. Services were held at Immaculate Conception Church on February 28, 1921, and interment at Metairie Cemetery.

== Personal life ==
In 1868, Louis H. Marrero married Elodie Marrero, his second cousin. They had four children: sons Leo A., William Felix, and Louis H. Jr.; and a daughter who died prior to 1892. He was Catholic and a wealthy landowner. In the late nineteenth century, he obtained a large plot of land, located near the Ames Plantation, and he leased or sold small land's plots to vegetable farmers. He and his son, Leo A. Marrero, along with other relatives, founded the Marrero Land and Improvement Association, an organization that encompassed much of Westbank (particularly the Marrero and Harvey areas).

== Legacy ==
- The Marrero town and the Louis H Marrero Park, both located in Jefferson Parish, were founded after him.
- The Marrero Road (a road localized between Ames Boulevard and Barataria Boulevard) was founded after him. The Marrero Road was built at the principal land of Louis H. Marrero.
