= Waggaman, Louisiana =

- Census-designated place
- Location of Waggaman in Louisiana
- Coordinates: 29°55′47″N 90°13′48″W
- Country: United States
- State: Louisiana
- Parish: Jefferson
- Named for: George A. Waggaman

Area
  - Total: 6.56 sq mi (17.00 km^{2})
  - Land: 5.73 sq mi (14.85 km^{2})
  - Water: 0.83 sq mi (2.16 km^{2})

Population (2020)
  - Total: 9,835
  - Density: 1,715.6/sq mi (662.39/km^{2})
- Time zone: UTC-6 (CST)
  - Summer (DST): UTC-5 (CDT)
- ZIP Code: 70094 (Westwego)
- Area code: 504
- GNIS feature ID: 558340

Waggaman is a census-designated place and unincorporated community in Jefferson Parish, Louisiana, United States. Waggaman is on the West Bank of the Mississippi River, within the New Orleans–Metairie–Kenner metropolitan statistical area. The population was 9,835 at the 2020 census. The area was named for U.S. Senator George Augustus Waggaman (1782–1843).

== History ==
George Augustus Waggaman settled in the area with his wife, Camille Arnoult, who inherited a large tract of land there. The two built a considerable plantation which they named Avondale, which later succumbed to the Mississippi River in 1892. Today the Avondale area, an unincorporated community which abuts Waggaman, was home to Avondale Shipyards, one of the largest employers in Jefferson Parish.

== Geography ==
Waggaman is located on the west side of Jefferson Parish at 29°55′47″N 90°13′48″W (29.929856, -90.230053), on the southwest side of the Mississippi River. It is bordered to the southeast by Avondale. Across the Mississippi, it is bordered to the north by Kenner, to the northeast by River Ridge, and to the east by Harahan. U.S. Route 90 forms the southern border of Waggaman and leads east 14 miles (23 km) into New Orleans. Louisiana Highway 18 (River Road) runs along the river side of the community, leading east into Avondale and west (upriver) 10 miles (16 km) to Interstate 310 in Luling.

According to the United States Census Bureau, the Waggaman CDP has a total area of 6.6 square miles (17.0 km^{2}), of which 5.5 square miles (14.2 km^{2}) are land and 1.1 square miles (2.8 km^{2}), or 16.29%, are water.

== Demographics ==
Historical population
Census	Pop.	Note	%±
1980	9,004		—
1990	9,405		4.5%
2000	9,435		0.3%
2010	10,015		6.1%
2020	9,835		−1.8%
U.S. Decennial Census; 1960 1970 1980; 1990 2000 2010

Waggaman was first listed as a census designated place in the 1980 United States census.

Waggaman CDP, Louisiana – Racial and ethnic composition Note: the U.S. Census Bureau treats Hispanic/Latino as an ethnic category. This table excludes Latinos from the racial categories and assigns them to a separate category. Hispanics/Latinos may be of any race.
Race / Ethnicity (NH = Non-Hispanic)	Pop 2000	Pop 2010	Pop 2020	% 2000	% 2010	% 2020
White alone (NH)	3,749	2,852	2,302	39.74%	28.48%	23.41%
Black or African American alone (NH)	5,112	6,328	6,355	54.18%	63.19%	64.62%
Native American or Alaska Native alone (NH)	43	55	47	0.46%	0.55%	0.48%
Asian alone (NH)	67	90	125	0.71%	0.90%	1.27%
Native Hawaiian or Pacific Islander alone (NH)	1	3	0	0.01%	0.03%	0.00%
Other race alone (NH)	8	9	48	0.08%	0.09%	0.49%
Mixed race or Multiracial (NH)	63	106	244	0.67%	1.06%	2.48%
Hispanic or Latino (any race)	392	572	714	4.15%	5.71%	7.26%
Total	9,435	10,015	9,835	100.00%	100.00%	100.00%

The 2019 American Community Survey determined 10,017 people lived in the CDP, an increase of 2 people since the 2010 U.S. census. At the 2020 census, there were 9,835 people in the CDP. In 2019, the racial and ethnic makeup of the CDP was 65.7% Black or African American, 24.8% non-Hispanic white, 1.1% American Indian and Alaska Native, 1.5% some other race, 2.4% multiracial, and 6.3% Hispanic and Latino American of any race. A year later, the racial and ethnic makeup was a tabulated 64.62% Black or African American, 23.41% non-Hispanic white, 0.48% American Indian and Alaska Native, 1.27% Asian, 2.97% multiracial or of another race, and 7.26% Hispanic and Latino American of any race. The median household income was $46,075 and 30.1% of the population lived at or below the poverty line in 2019.

== Education ==
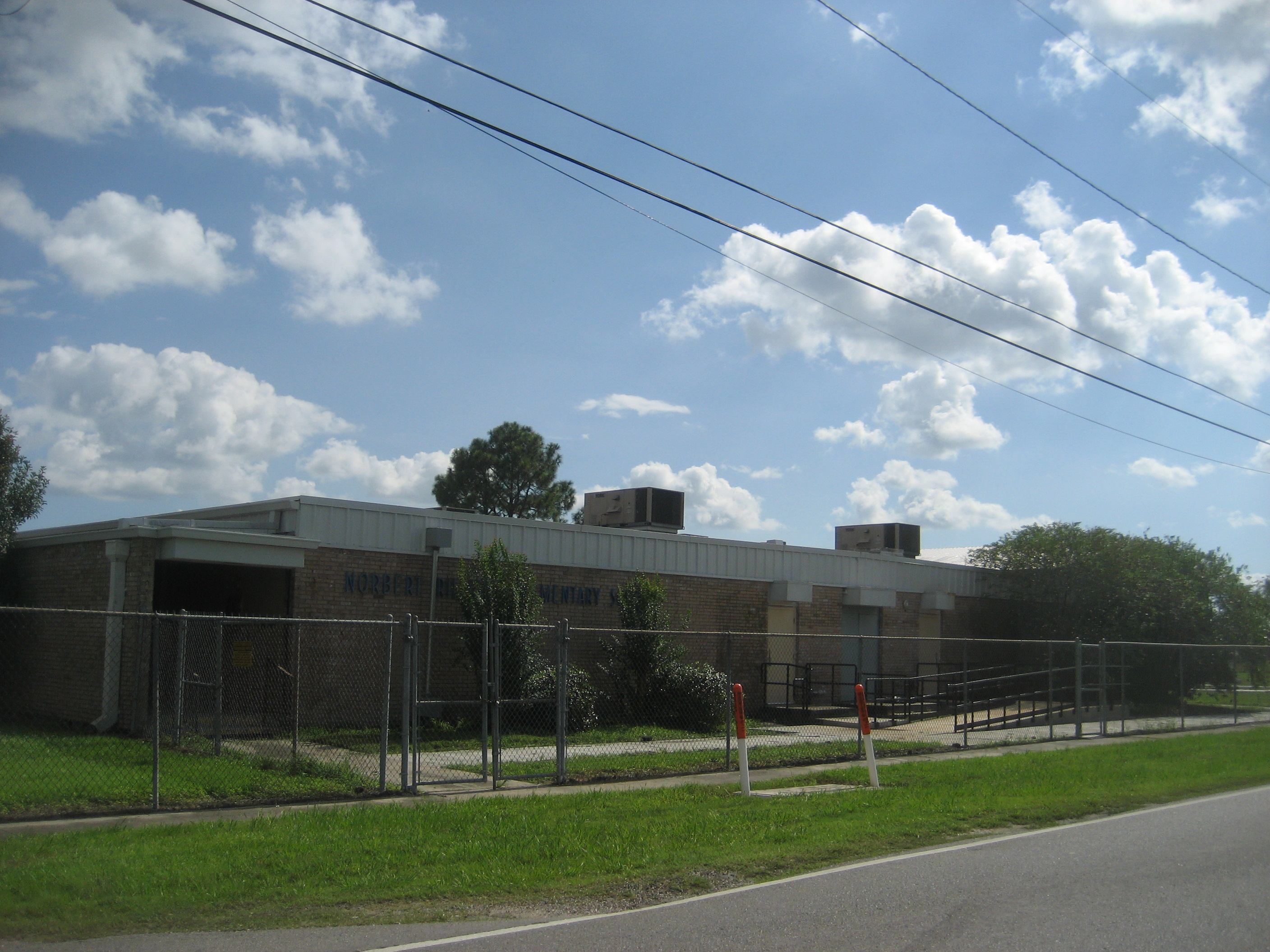
Norbert Rillieux Elementary School

Jefferson Parish Public School System serves Waggaman.

All residents are zoned to: Cherbonnier K-8 School in Waggaman CDP for elementary and middle school. Previously the school, then Lucille Cherbonnier/Norbert Rillieux Elementary School, was two separate campuses: Norbert Rillieux Elementary School and Cherbonnier Elementary School. In 2012 the superintendent recommended that the schools be consolidated with the Cherbonnier campus being used. The zoned high school is L.W. Higgins High School in Marrero.

When Cherbonnier/Rilieux was elementary-only, it had elementary grades, while Henry Ford Middle School in Avondale had middle school grades. Henry Ford later became Gilbert PreK-8 School.

In regards to advanced studies academies, residents are zoned to the Marrero Academy.

Jefferson Parish Library operates the Live Oak Library in Waggaman. The library, located adjacent to Thomas Jefferson Park, opened in 1989. It is designed to appear similar to an Acadian style cottage.

== Public safety ==
Waggaman is served by the Jefferson Parish Sheriffs Department and the Live Oak Manor Fire Department.
