= West Return Floodwall =

Coordinates: 29.8490°N 90.1981°W

The West Return Floodwall is a project to construct a new flood wall in the Jefferson Parish lakefront area of New Orleans. The goal is to reduce flooding risk for residences and businesses caused by a storm surge associated with an event that has a 1 percent chance of occurring in any given year.

== Location ==
The project is located on the east bank of the Mississippi River at the western end of Jefferson Parish. The West Return Floodwall runs along the St. Charles and Jefferson Parish line from the Louis Armstrong New Orleans International Airport to Lake Pontchartrain.

== Composition ==
The floodwall, traveling north to south along the parish line, will tie into the Jefferson Parish Lakefront levees and the St. Charles Parish risk reduction features. The T-wall will reduce the risk from storm surges entering the La Branche wetlands from Lake Pontchartrain. The entire reach of the existing floodwall will be replaced with a larger, more robust T-wall. The new T-wall will be built on the flood side of the existing floodwall. The old floodwall will then be removed once construction of the new wall is complete.

== Status ==
Construction project began in the summer of 2010. In order to expedite construction, the project has been divided into two separate contracts; the contract to construct the northern segment from I-10 north to the lake was awarded in July 2010. The contract to construct the southern segment from I-10 south to the airport was awarded in July 2010, however due to a protest, a stop work order was issued shortly after the award date. An investigation by Government Accountability Office is underway to resolve the protest and a three- to four-month delay is possible before construction can proceed.
