= Westwego, Louisiana =

- City
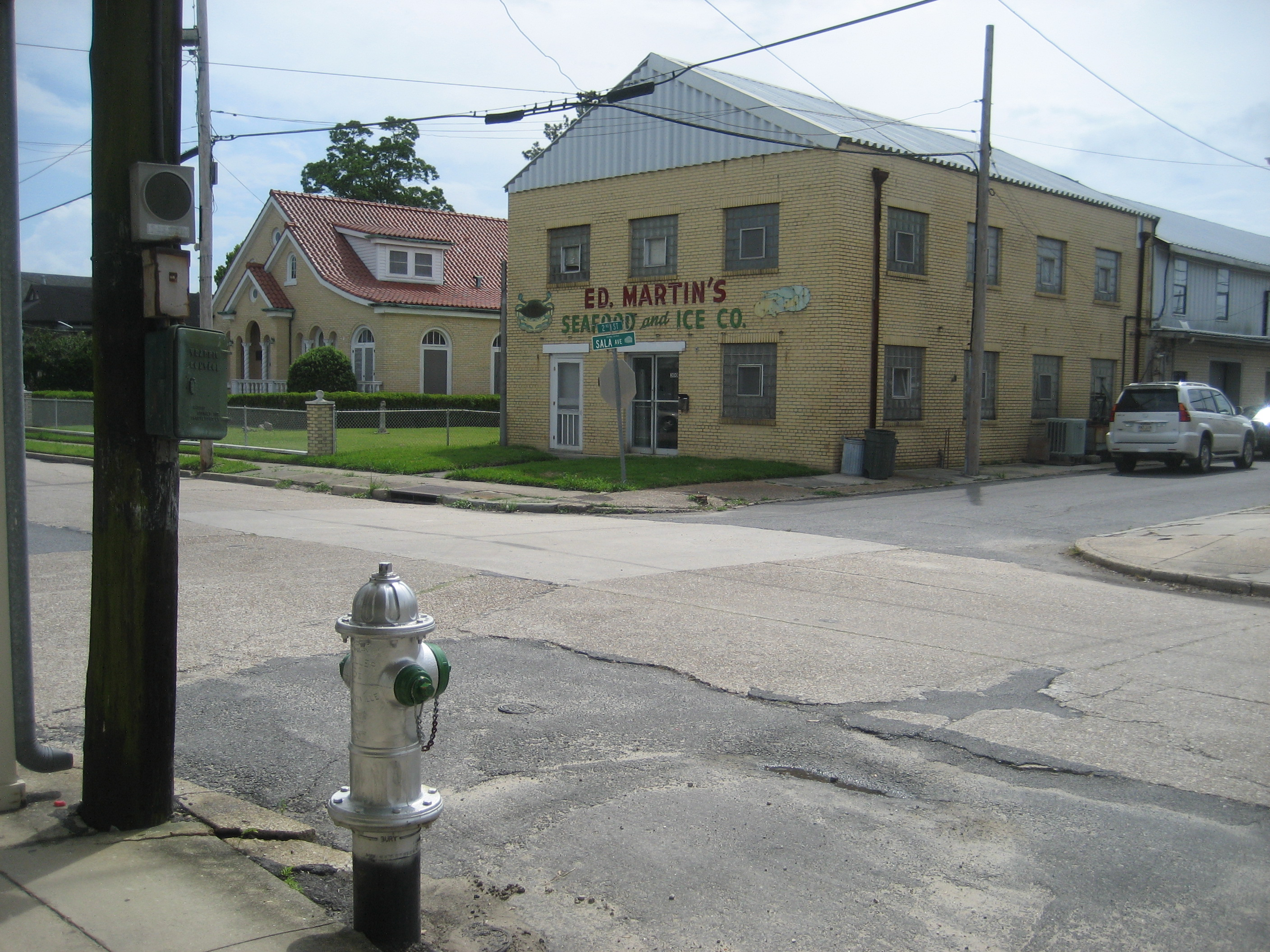
- Ed Martin's

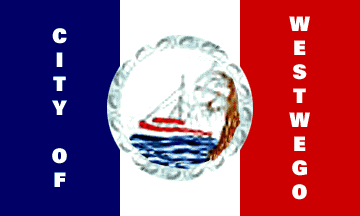
- Flag Wordmark

- Location of Westwego in Jefferson Parish, Louisiana

- Location of Louisiana in the United States
- Coordinates: 29°54′11″N 90°08′35″W
- Country: United States
- State: Louisiana
- Parish: Jefferson

Government
  - Mayor: Robert Billiot (R)

Area
  - Total: 3.59 sq mi (9.31 km^{2})
  - Land: 3.12 sq mi (8.07 km^{2})
  - Water: 0.48 sq mi (1.24 km^{2})
- Elevation: 03 ft (0.91 m)

Population (2020)
  - Total: 8,568
  - Rank: JE: 4th
  - Density: 2,749.7/sq mi (1,061.65/km^{2})
- Time zone: UTC-6 (CST)
  - Summer (DST): UTC-5 (CDT)
- ZIP code: 70094
- Area code: 504
- FIPS code: 22-81165
- GNIS feature ID: 2405721
- Website: www.visitwestwego.com

Westwego is a city in the U.S. state of Louisiana, located in Jefferson Parish. It is a suburban community of New Orleans in the Greater New Orleans metropolitan area and lies along the west bank of the Mississippi River. The population of the city of Westwego was 8,568 at the 2020 United States census.

== Etymology ==
One story states that Westwego was so named because it was a major crossing point on the Mississippi River during the great westward movement of the late 19th century. When travelers were asked their destination, they would often reply "west we go". Another more specific tale, recounted in John Churchill Chase's Frenchmen, Desire, Good Children is that the name was the specific outcome of an 1871 meeting of a railroad board of directors in New York, where planning was undertaken to use the site as an eastern terminus ("...west we go from there"). There has been further speculation that this use of "Westwego" as a place name may have been influenced by the board members' familiarity with the name of Oswego, New York.

== History ==
=== Early history and development ===
The area of Westwego, Louisiana was inhabited by Native Americans for thousands of years before Europeans settled here. These indigenous people created huge shell middens that can still be seen in the vicinity today. The French first developed the area in 1719 when French minister of state Claude le Blanc started a plantation and a port along the Mississippi River.

The port became an important site in the history of the transatlantic slave trade. The estate was later owned by the Zeringue family, who turned it into bustling sugar plantation, known as Seven Oaks. Planter Camille Zeringue built a canal at the plantation that played a prominent role in the community's history for decades. Other antebellum plantations in the area included the Whitehouse Plantation, Magnolia Lane, and the LaBranche Plantation among others. After Camille Zeringue's death, Seven Oaks was owned by Pablo Sala, who divided the property along the canal into lots, which he sold for $40 each. Many of these lots were purchased by displaced hurricane victims from Cheniere Caminada whose homes were destroyed in the great unnamed 1893 storm. With the addition of these families, who were mostly fisherman and trappers, the community of Salaville was born.

Salaville grew and the local railroad barons coined the name "Westwego". A number of industries grew around the city's wetlands and bayous, including those involving fisheries, shrimping, the canning of seafood, etc. Westwego was incorporated as a city in 1951 as its population continued to grow and grow. Within the last decade, Westwego has taken on a number of historical restoration projects, inspired by historian Daniel P. Alario Sr.

=== Grain elevator explosion ===
On December 23, 1977, the Continental Grain Elevator in Westwego exploded. The explosion and resulting collapse of the elevator killed 36 people and injured at least 11 others. Most of the fatalities were caused by a concrete tower collapsing onto an office building, where workers were gathered for a Christmas party. The explosion is believed to have been caused by the ignition of grain dust. The blast caused silos to fall and lean against each over in essentially a domino effect. The accident is the deadliest grain elevator accident in history. The Westwego accident, along with other explosions that occurred within the two-year period, led to new regulations for preventing dust explosions.

== Geography ==
The city of Westwego is located in the Greater New Orleans metropolitan area and region. According to the United States Census Bureau, the city has a total area of 3.6 square miles (9.3 km^{2}), of which 3.1 square miles (8.0 km^{2}) is land and 0.5 square miles (1.3 km^{2}), or 10.64%, is water.

== Demographics ==
Historical population
Census	Pop.	Note	%±
1930	3,987		—
1940	4,997		25.3%
1950	8,328		66.7%
1960	9,815		17.9%
1970	11,402		16.2%
1980	12,663		11.1%
1990	11,218		−11.4%
2000	10,763		−4.1%
2010	8,534		−20.7%
2020	8,568		0.4%
2025 (est.)	8,317	▼	−2.9%
U.S. Decennial Census

Westwego city, Louisiana – Racial and ethnic composition Note: the U.S. Census Bureau treats Hispanic/Latino as an ethnic category. This table excludes Latinos from the racial categories and assigns them to a separate category. Hispanics/Latinos may be of any race.
Race / Ethnicity (NH = Non-Hispanic)	Pop 2000	Pop 2010	Pop 2020	% 2000	% 2010	% 2020
White alone (NH)	7,846	5,996	4,956	72.90%	70.26%	57.84%
Black or African American alone (NH)	2,137	1,708	2,326	19.86%	20.01%	27.15%
Native American or Alaska Native alone (NH)	98	99	76	0.91%	1.16%	0.89%
Asian alone (NH)	165	64	87	1.53%	0.75%	1.02%
Native Hawaiian or Pacific Islander alone (NH)	0	1	3	0.00%	0.01%	0.04%
Other race alone (NH)	11	17	50	0.10%	0.20%	0.58%
Mixed race or Multiracial (NH)	120	119	310	1.11%	1.39%	3.62%
Hispanic or Latino (any race)	386	530	760	3.59%	6.21%	8.87%
Total	10,763	8,534	8,568	100.00%	100.00%	100.00%

According to the 2010 United States census, there were 8,534 people, 3,811 households, and 2,450 families residing in the city. By the 2020 census, there were 8,568 people living in Westwego.

Since 2010, there were 4,211 households, out of which 32.7% had children under the age of 18 living with them, 41.1% were married couples living together, 20.8% had a female householder with no husband present, and 32.3% were non-families. 26.7% of all households were made up of individuals, and 10.5% had someone living alone who was 65 years of age or older. The average household size was 2.56 and the average family size was 3.10. Among the population in 2020, there were 3,265 households. In the city, the population was spread out, with 27.5% under the age of 18, 8.9% from 18 to 24, 29.9% from 25 to 44, 21.2% from 45 to 64, and 12.5% who were 65 years of age or older. The median age was 35 years. For every 100 females, there were 90.5 males. For every 100 females age 18 and over, there were 84.6 males at the 2010 census. By 2020, the median age increased to 38.9 years, reflecting the aging population of the city.

In 2010, the racial makeup of the city was 78.16% White, 14.02% Black and African American, 2.94% Native American, 1.58% Asian, 1.01% from other races, and 1.40% from two or more races. Hispanic or Latino Americans of any race were 4.59% of the population. Per the 2019 American Community Survey, the population of Westwego was 58.4% non-Hispanic white, 26.7% Black and African American, 1.4% American Indian or Alaska Native, 4.4% Asian, 0.1% some other race, 1.5% two or more races, and 7.4% Hispanic and Latino American of any race. Per the 2020 census, the racial and ethnic makeup was 57.84% non-Hispanic white, 27.15% Black or African American, 0.89% Native American, 1.02% Asian, 0.04% Pacific Islander, 4.2% multiracial or some other race, and 8.87% Hispanic or Latino American of any race; the growth of the non-white population from 2010 to 2020 reflected state- and nationwide trends of diversification.

In 2010, the median income for a household in the city was $27,218, and the median income for a family was $31,187. Males had a median income of $29,398 versus $18,916 for females. The per capita income for the city was $13,160. About 17.9% of families and 22.4% of the population were below the poverty line, including 33.7% of those under age 18 and 9.5% of those age 65 or over. In 2019, the median income for a household in the city was $30,126. Males had a median income of $30,217 versus $43,022 for females. An estimated 28.3% of the population lived at or below the poverty line.

== Education ==
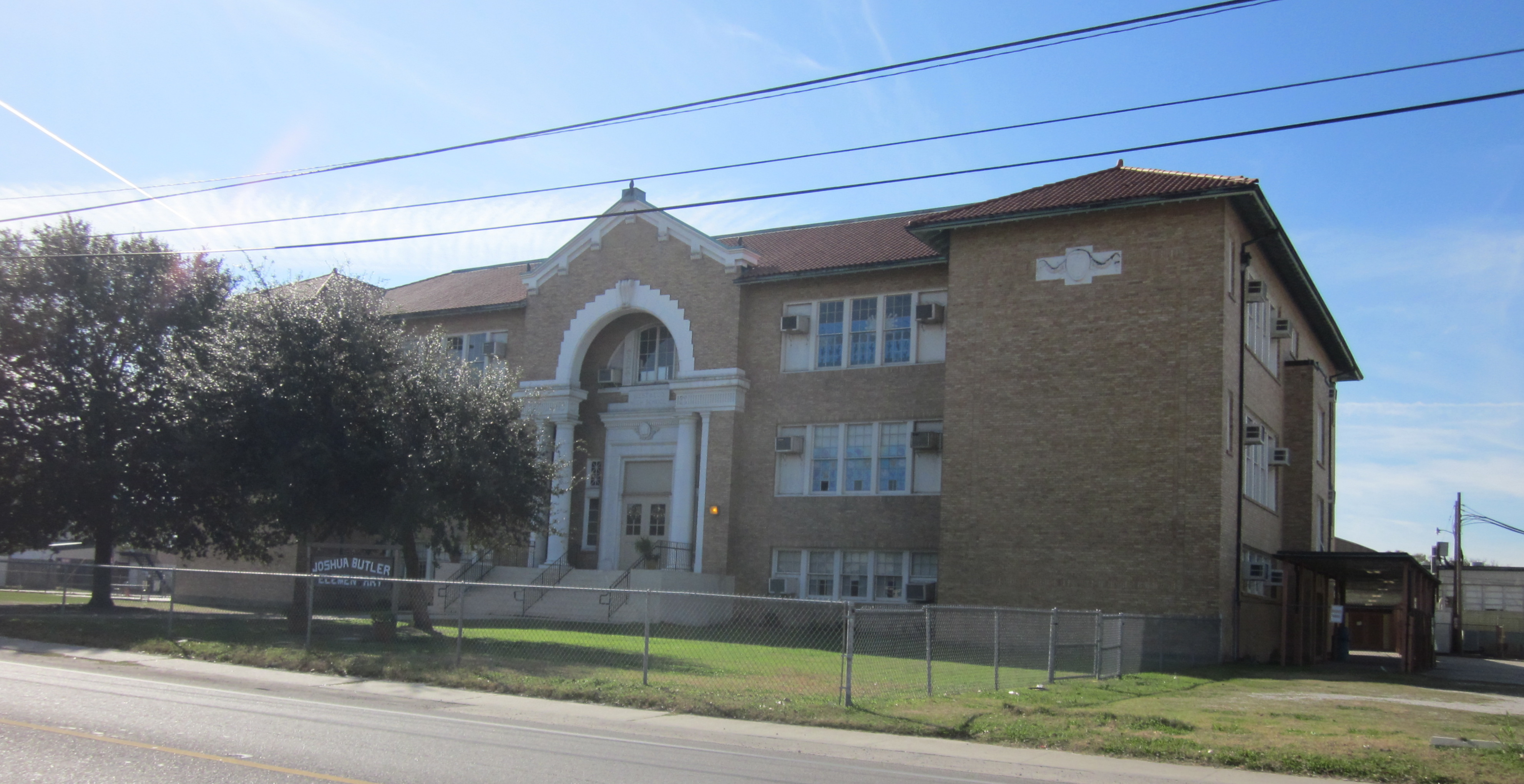
Joshua Butler School in Westwego

The public schools in Westwego are operated by the Jefferson Parish Public School System.

Elementary schools taking portions of Westwego include: Isaac G. Joseph Elementary School in Westwego, Gilbert PreK-8 school in Avondale, and Truman PreK-8 in Estelle. In 2020, Myrtle C. Thibodeaux and Vic A. Pitre Elementary Schools were consolidated into Joseph Elementary, on the site of Pitre, and named after the first African-American superintendent of the school district. Most middle school Westwego residents are zoned to Worley Middle School in Westwego, while some are zoned to Gilbert PreK-8 and Truman PreK-8. Gilbert was known as Henry Ford Middle School until 2019. High school residents are zoned to L. W. Higgins High School in an unincorporated area.

Our Lady of Prompt Succor Catholic School is a private Catholic school (of the Roman Catholic Archdiocese of New Orleans) in the city.

Jefferson Parish Library operates the Edith S. Lawson Library in Westwego.

In 2020, Ray St. Pierre Academy moved into the Thibodaux facility. Joshua Butler Elementary School, a public elementary school in Westwego, closed in 2023.

== Notable people ==
- John Alario, dean of the Louisiana State Legislature; State Senate President since 2012
- Sherman A. Bernard (1925-2012), Louisiana insurance commissioner lived at the time of his election in 1972 in Westwego.
- Robert Billiot, member of the Louisiana House of Representatives for Jefferson Parish since 2008; former educator from Westwego
- Skyler Green, reared in Westwego, professional football wide receiver and return specialist
- Ted Haggard, former Evangelical preacher, lived there for a short while in 2007 after a gay prostitution scandal
