= Estelle, Louisiana =

- Census-designated place
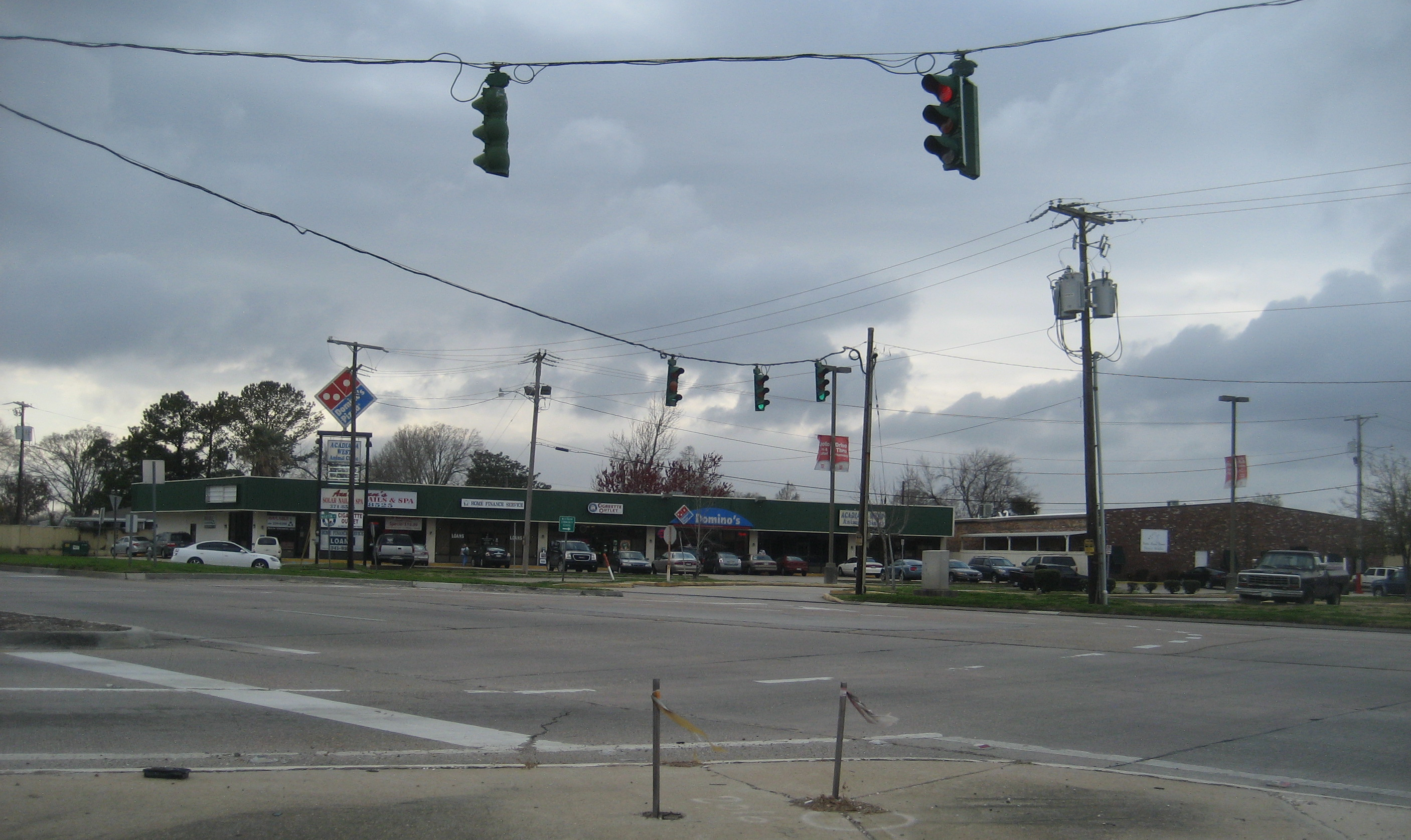
- Shops in Estelle, Louisiana, 2010

- Location of Estelle in Louisiana
- Coordinates: 29°50′51″N 90°06′29″W
- Country: United States
- State: Louisiana
- Parish: Jefferson

Area
  - Total: 4.65 sq mi (12.04 km^{2})
  - Land: 4.64 sq mi (12.01 km^{2})
  - Water: 0.0077 sq mi (0.02 km^{2})
- Elevation: 0 ft (0 m)

Population (2020)
  - Total: 17,952
  - Density: 3,870.6/sq mi (1,494.43/km^{2})
- Time zone: UTC-6 (CST)
  - Summer (DST): UTC-5 (CDT)
- ZIP Code: 70072
- Area code: 504
- FIPS code: 22-24390

Estelle is a census-designated place (CDP) in Jefferson Parish, Louisiana, United States. The population was 17,952 in 2020. It is part of the New Orleans–Metairie–Kenner metropolitan statistical area.

Estelle is located south of Marrero; the urbanized areas of the communities meet, and some businesses in Estelle list their addresses as "Marrero". The Jean Lafitte National Park Barataria Preserve is adjacent to Estelle.

== History ==
Part of the colonial era Isleño Barataria Settlement was in the southern part of what is now Estelle. Estelle became the location of the WWL-AM transmitter.

== Geography ==
Estelle is located at 29°50′51″N 90°6′29″W (29.847527, -90.108117). It is bordered to the north by Marrero and to the east by Woodmere. It is 12 miles (19 km) by highway or 7 miles (11 km) in a straight line southwest of downtown New Orleans. According to the United States Census Bureau, the CDP has a total area of 5.02 square miles (13.01 km^{2}), of which 0.01 square miles (0.02 km^{2}), or 0.18%, are water.

== Demographics ==
Historical population
| Census | Pop. | Note | %± |
|---|---|---|---|
| 1990 | 14,091 | | — |
| 2000 | 15,880 | | 12.7% |
| 2010 | 16,377 | | 3.1% |
| 2020 | 17,952 | | 9.6% |
U.S. Decennial Census; 1950 1960 1970 1980; 1990 2000 2010

Estelle first appeared as a census designated place in the 1990 U.S. census.

Estelle racial composition as of 2020
| Race | Number | Percentage |
|---|---|---|
| White (non-Hispanic) | 8,470 | 47.18% |
| Black or African American (non-Hispanic) | 4,985 | 27.77% |
| Native American | 141 | 0.79% |
| Asian | 1,002 | 5.58% |
| Pacific Islander | 3 | 0.02% |
| Other/Mixed | 837 | 4.66% |
| Hispanic or Latino | 2,514 | 14.0% |

The 2019 American Community Survey estimated 17,968 people lived in the CDP, up from 16,377 at the 2010 U.S. census. At the 2020 United States census, there were 17,952 people in the CDP. In 2019, the racial and ethnic makeup was 50.5% non-Hispanic white, 26.6% Black or African American, 0.2% Native American, 6.2% Asian, 6.6% some other race, 3.5% multiracial, and 12.3% Hispanic and Latino American of any race. The 2020 census determined 47.18% of its population was non-Hispanic white, 27.77% Black or African American, 0.79% Native American, 5.58% Asian, 0.02% Pacific Islander, 4.66% two or more races, and 14.0% Hispanic and Latino American of any race. The growth of the Asian American and Hispanic or Latino American population in the CDP and others in Jefferson Parish have reflected the greater diversification of the U.S. following non-Hispanic white demographic decline. The median household income was $68,051 and 14.3% of the population were at or below the poverty line in 2019.

== Education ==
Residents are assigned to schools in the Jefferson Parish Public Schools system.

K-8 schools that include portions of Estelle include: Allen Ellender, Estelle, Congetta Trippe Janet, and Harry Truman. A portion in the north of the CDP is zoned to Pittman Elementary, and Marrero Middle School. Most residents are zoned to John Ehret High School, while some are zoned to L.W. Higgins High School in Marrero.

In regards to advanced studies academies, residents are zoned to the Marrero Academy.

Previously Ellender was solely a middle school, and Estelle was divided between Ellender and Truman at the middle school level. Therefore, Ellender did not serve any portions of Estelle at the elementary level. In the mid-2010s, Miller Wall Elementary in Marrero included parts of Estelle. Schools that served Estelle for middle school in the mid-2010s were Ellender PK-8, Truman Middle in Estelle, and Worley Middle in Harvey.
