= Jefferson Parish, Louisiana =

Parish in Louisiana, United States

Jefferson Parish
- Parish
- Parish of Jefferson; Paroisse de Jefferson (French)
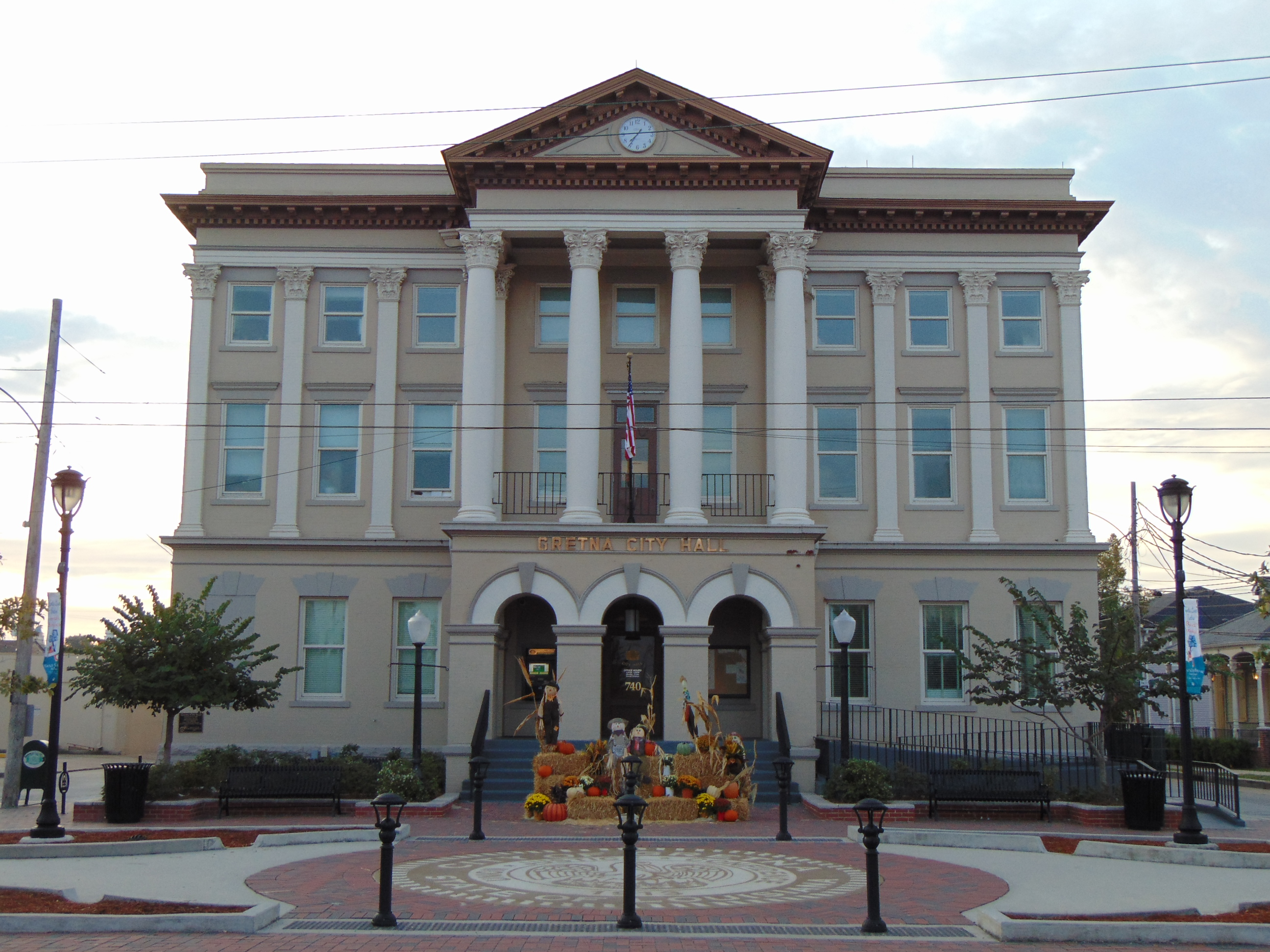
- City Hall in Gretna

- Flag Seal Logo

- Location within the U.S. state of Louisiana
- Coordinates: 29°44′N 90°06′W
- Country: United States
- State: Louisiana
- Founded: February 11, 1825
- Named for: Thomas Jefferson
- Seat: Gretna
- Largest community: Metairie

Area
  - Total: 665 sq mi (1,720 km^{2})
  - Land: 296 sq mi (770 km^{2})
  - Water: 370 sq mi (960 km^{2}) 56%

Population (2020)
  - Total: 440,781
  - Estimate (2025): 431,398 ▼
  - Density: 660/sq mi (250/km^{2})
- Time zone: UTC−6 (Central)
  - Summer (DST): UTC−5 (CDT)
- Area code: 504,985
- Congressional districts: 1st, 2nd, 6th
- Website: www.jeffparish.gov

Jefferson Parish (French: Paroisse de Jefferson) is a parish in the U.S. state of Louisiana. As of the 2020 census, the population was 440,781. Its parish seat is Gretna, its largest community is Metairie, and its largest incorporated city is Kenner. Jefferson Parish is included in the Greater New Orleans area.

== History ==
=== 1825 to 1940 ===
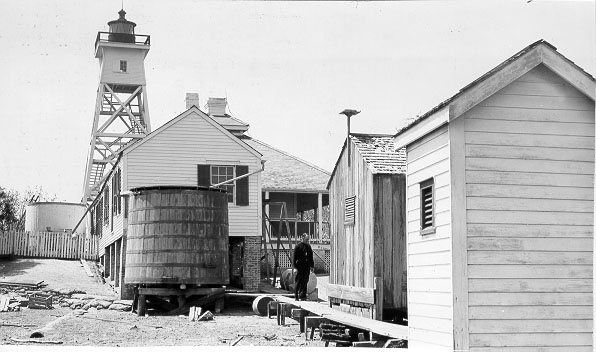
Barataria Bay Lighthouse, c. 1903

Jefferson Parish was named in honor of U.S. President Thomas Jefferson of Virginia when the parish was established by the Louisiana Legislature on February 11, 1825, a year before Jefferson died. A bronze statue of Jefferson stands at the entrance of the General Government Complex on Derbigny Street in Gretna. The parish seat was in the city of Lafayette, until that area was annexed by New Orleans in 1852. In that year the parish government moved to Carrollton, where it remained for twenty-two years.

In 1863 Abraham Lincoln mentioned Jefferson Parish in the Emancipation Proclamation as a confederate parish.

Originally, this parish was larger than it is today, running from Felicity Street in New Orleans to the St. Charles Parish line. However, as New Orleans grew, it absorbed the cities of Lafayette, Jefferson City, Carrollton, and several unincorporated areas (faubourgs). These became part of Orleans Parish. The present borders between Jefferson Parish and Orleans Parish were set in 1874. The Jefferson Parish seat was moved to Gretna at the same time. (The historic city of Lafayette in Jefferson Parish, as it was recorded in U.S. census records until 1870, should not be confused with Lafayette, Louisiana, in Lafayette Parish.)

=== 1940 to 2000 ===
From the 1940s to the 1970s, Jefferson's population swelled with an influx of middle-class white families from Orleans Parish. The parish's population doubled in size from 1940 to 1950 and again from 1950 to 1960 as the parents behind the post–World War II baby boom, profiting from rising living standards and dissatisfied with their old neighborhoods, chose relocation to new neighborhoods of detached single-family housing. By the 1960s, rising racial tensions in New Orleans complicated the impetus behind the migration, as many new arrivals sought not only more living space but also residence in a political jurisdiction independent from New Orleans proper.

The earliest postwar subdivisions were developed on the Eastbank of Jefferson Parish ("East Jefferson") along the pre-existing Jefferson Highway and Airline Highway routes, often relatively far-removed from the New Orleans city line, as land prices were lower further away from New Orleans and land assembly was easier. The completion of Veterans Highway in the late 1950s, following a route parallel to Airline but further north, stimulated more development. The arrival of I-10 in the early 1960s resulted in the demolition of some homes in the Old Metairie neighborhood, where development began in the 1920s, but resulted in even easier access to suburban East Jefferson.

In the portion of Jefferson Parish on the Westbank of the Mississippi River ("West Jefferson"), large-scale suburban development commenced with the completion, in 1958, of the Greater New Orleans Bridge crossing the Mississippi River at downtown New Orleans. Terrytown, within the city limits of Gretna, was the first large subdivision to be developed. Subsequent development has been extensive, taking place within Harvey, Marrero, Westwego and Avondale.

Similar to the development trajectory observed by other U.S. suburban areas, Jefferson began to enjoy a significant employment base by the 1970s and 1980s, shedding its earlier role as a simple bedroom community. In East Jefferson, the Causeway Boulevard corridor grew into a commercial office node, while the Elmwood neighborhood developed as a center for light manufacturing and distribution. By the mid-1990s, Jefferson Parish was exhibiting some of the symptoms presented by inner-ring suburbs throughout the United States. Median household income growth slowed, even trailing income growth rates in New Orleans proper, such that the inner city began to narrow the gap in median household income, a gap at its widest at the time of the 1980 census. St. Tammany Parish and, to a lesser extent, St. Charles Parish began to attract migrants from New Orleans, and increasingly even from Jefferson Parish itself. These trends were catalyzed by Hurricane Katrina, which destroyed much of New Orleans' low-income housing and propelled further numbers of lower-income individuals into Jefferson Parish.

Despite these challenges, Jefferson Parish still contains the largest number of middle class residents in metropolitan New Orleans and acts as the retail hub for the entire metro area.

=== Hurricane Katrina (2005) ===
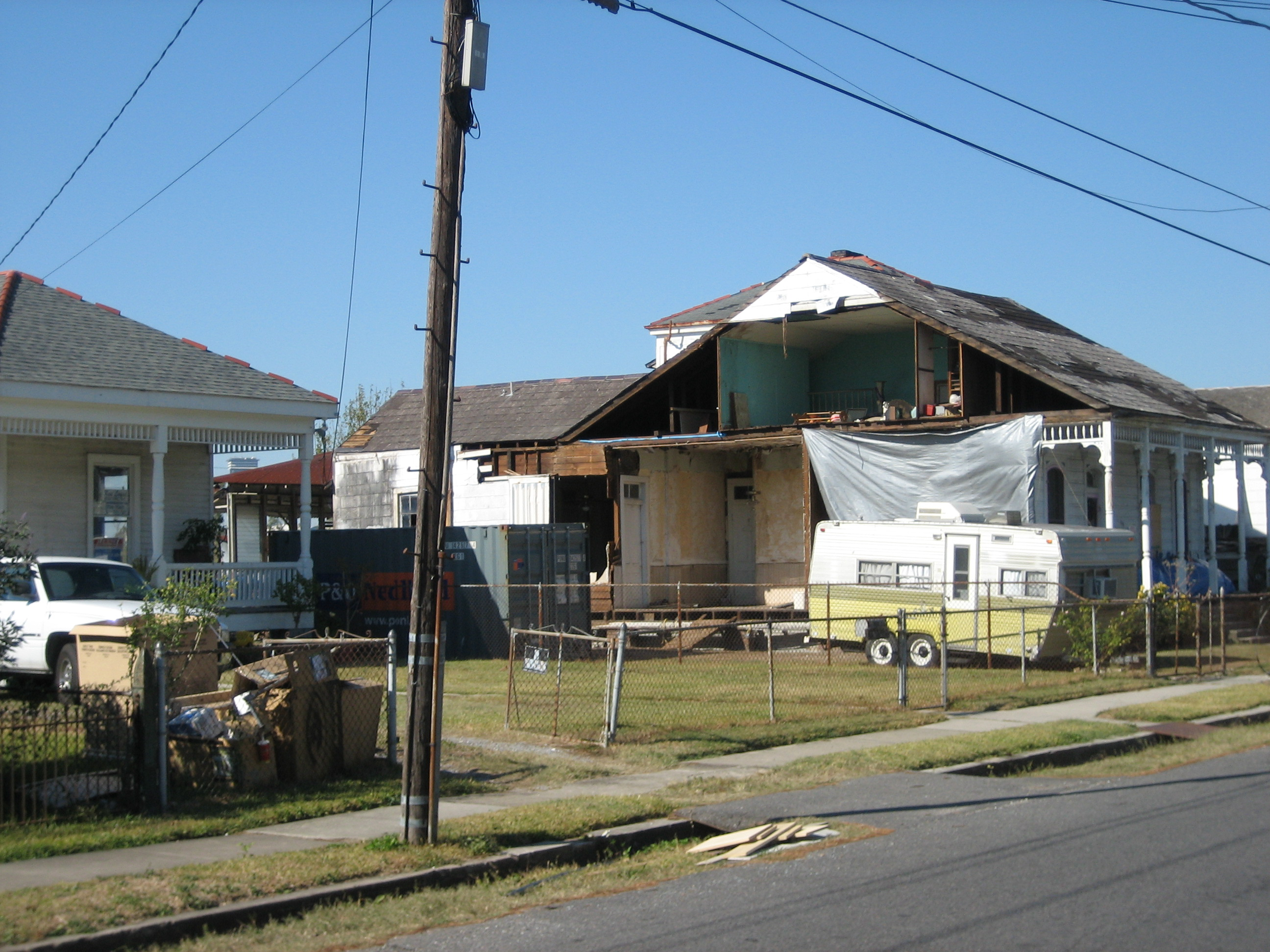
Gretna after Hurricane Katrina, 2005

Even though Jefferson Parish was affected by Hurricane Katrina, it has rebounded more quickly than Orleans Parish, since the devastation was not as severe. The parish has a current population of 432,000, which is 15,000 fewer people than was recorded by the 2000 U.S. census. New Orleans' Katrina-provoked population loss has resulted in Jefferson Parish becoming the second most populous parish behind East Baton Rouge Parish, center of the Baton Rouge metropolitan area.

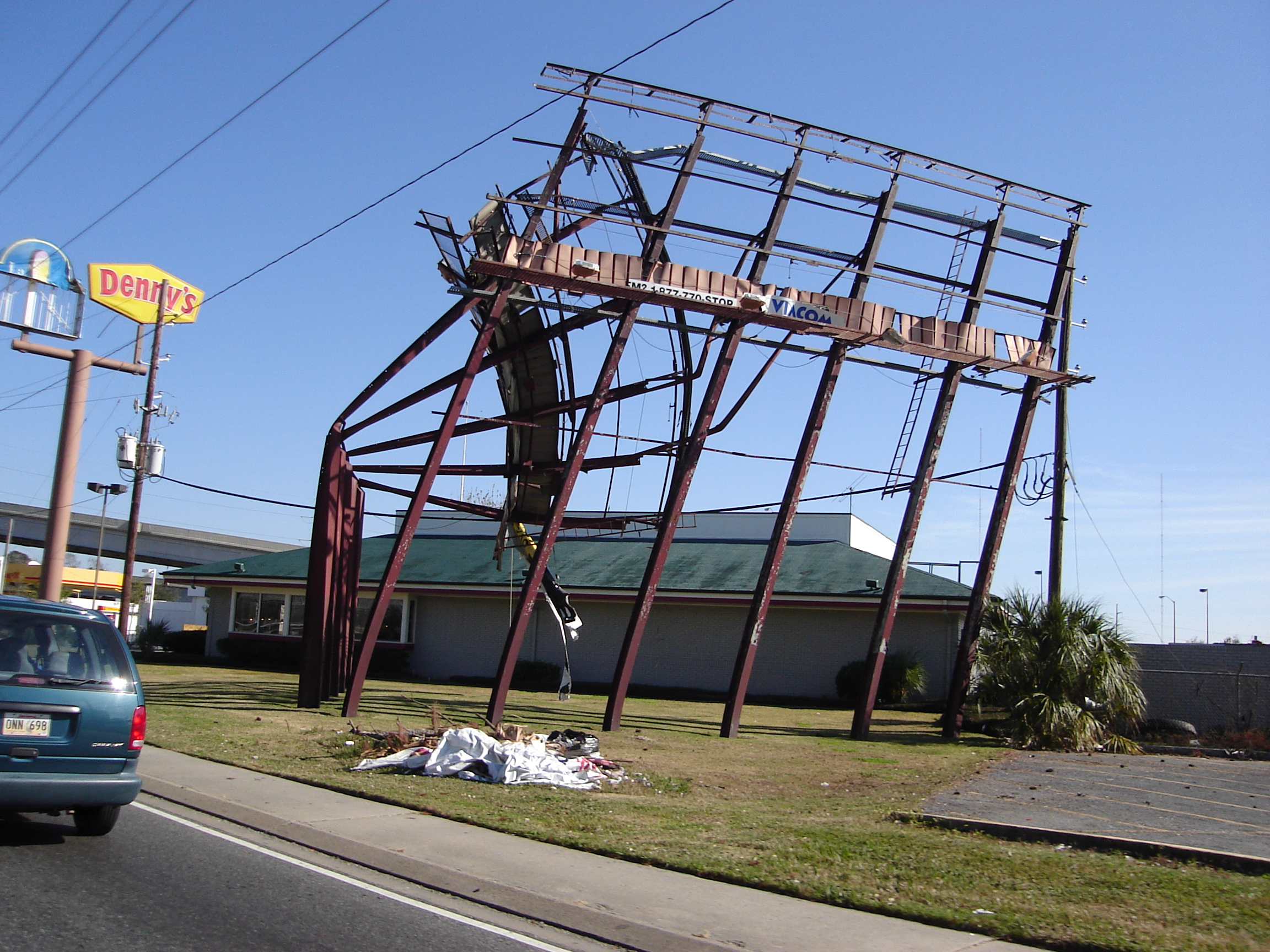
Billboard in Terrytown after Katrina, 2005

With the landfall of Hurricane Katrina on August 29, 2005, Jefferson Parish took a hard hit. On the East Bank, widespread flooding occurred, especially in the eastern part of the parish, as well as much wind damage. Schools also were reported to have been severely damaged. On the West Bank, there was little to no flooding, though there was still much wind damage. As a result, the Jefferson Parish Council temporarily moved the parish government to Baton Rouge. Evacuees of Jefferson Parish were told that they could expect to be able to go back to their homes starting Monday, September 5, 2005, between the hours of 6 a.m. CDT and 6 p.m. CDT, but would have to return to their places of evacuation because life in the area was not sustainable. There were no open grocery stores or gas stations, and almost the entire parish had no electric, water, or sewerage services. Moreover, evacuations out of New Orleans were continuing to be staged from the heart of Metairie at the intersection of Interstate 10 and Causeway Boulevard, and traffic throughout the area was primarily restricted to emergency and utility vehicles.

On September 4, Jefferson Parish President Aaron Broussard broke down on Meet the Press

RUSSERT: You just heard the director of Homeland Security's explanation of what has happened this last week. What is your reaction?

BROUSSARD: We have been abandoned by our own country. Hurricane Katrina will go down in history as one of the worst storms ever to hit an American coast. But the aftermath of Hurricane Katrina will go down as one of the worst abandonments of Americans on American soil ever in U.S. history. … Whoever is at the top of this totem pole, that totem pole needs to be chainsawed off and we've got to start with some new leadership. It's not just Katrina that caused all these deaths in New Orleans here. Bureaucracy has committed murder here in the greater New Orleans area and bureaucracy has to stand trial before Congress now....

Three quick examples. We had Wal-Mart deliver three trucks of water. FEMA turned them back. They said we didn't need them. This was a week ago. FEMA, we had 1,000 gallons of diesel fuel on a Coast Guard vessel docked in my parish. When we got there with our trucks, FEMA says don't give you the fuel. Yesterday — yesterday — FEMA comes in and cuts all of our emergency communication lines. They cut them without notice. Our sheriff, Harry Lee, goes back in, he reconnects the line. He posts armed guards and said no one is getting near these lines…

I want to give you one last story and I'll shut up and let you tell me whatever you want to tell me. The guy who runs this building I'm in, Emergency Management, he's responsible for everything. His mother was trapped in St. Bernard nursing home and every day she called him and said, "Are you coming, son? Is somebody coming?" and he said, "Yeah, Mama, somebody's coming to get you." Somebody's coming to get you on Tuesday. Somebody's coming to get you on Wednesday. Somebody's coming to get you on Thursday. Somebody's coming to get you on Friday… and she drowned Friday night. She drowned Friday night! [Sobbing] Nobody's coming to get us. Nobody's coming to get us…

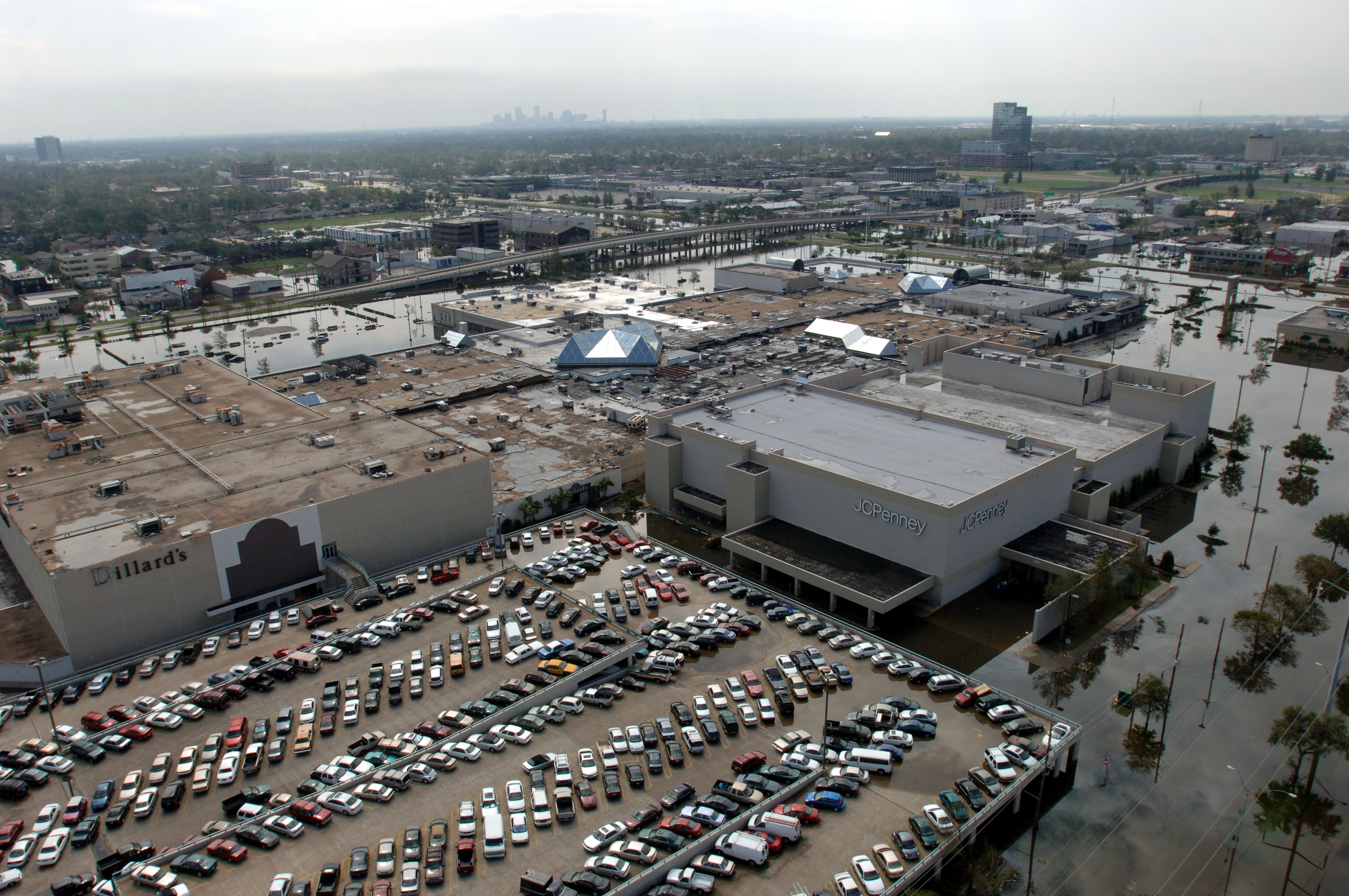
Metairie after Katrina, 2005

By the following weekend, the local electrical utility, Entergy, had restored power to large swaths of Jefferson Parish, and the parish public works department had restored water and sewer service to most of the areas with power. East Jefferson General Hospital never ceased operation, even through the storm. Nevertheless, Broussard continued to discourage residents from returning until all major streets were clear of downed trees, powerlines and major debris. The parish's initial focus was on helping businesses through the "Jumpstart Jefferson" program that allowed business operators into the parish before residents. Nevertheless, some independent-minded residents began moving back into the parish even before Broussard issued a formal "all-clear", and some gas stations, grocery stores, restaurants and a Home Depot were in operation during this time.

Broussard's report of the events he discussed on Meet the Press have subsequently proven to be inaccurate. The son of the drowned woman was later identified as Thomas Rodrigue, who replied, "No, no, that's not true," when told of Broussard's account. An MSNBC interview with the man revealed that Rodrigue tried to contact his mother at the St. Rita nursing home on the days before the storm – Saturday, August 27 and Sunday, August 28, not Monday through Friday as Broussard had claimed—to encourage the home to evacuate. They did not, resulting in the deaths by drowning of more than 30 other residents.

Crucially, Jefferson's levees and floodwalls did not fail in the wake of Katrina, enabling floodwaters to be rapidly pumped out. As of October 2006, Jefferson Parish had, in effect, completely rebounded from Hurricane Katrina, while far more damaged Orleans Parish continued recovering at a slower rate. Estimates of Jefferson Parish's population ranged from 420,000 to 440,000, and this figure was expected to continue to rise as evacuated residents from Orleans Parish returned to metropolitan New Orleans.

==== Katrina-related flooding ====
Flooding on the east bank has been frequently attributed to the decision by parish leadership to deactivate the stormwater pumping systems and evacuate the operators during the storm. Katrina's substantial storm surge may have swamped even operating pumping stations but Broussard's activation of the parish's "Doomsday Plan" is the most frequently cited reason for the flooding in all areas of the east bank except Old Metairie and parts of Harahan. Pump operators were evacuated to areas outside the parish that were themselves severely affected by the storm and pump station personnel were consequently unable to immediately return to restart the pumps. They did not arrive until the morning of August 31. Water resulting from the backflow through the non-operating pumping stations, as well as storm-related rainwater, remained on the streets and in the homes of residents of Metairie and Kenner for a day and a half. Many homes which were not severely damaged by storm winds took heavy flood damage, especially along both sides of the West Esplanade canal, from the 17th Street Canal to Kenner. The parish has subsequently announced that it will change the way it evacuates critical personnel during an emergency, both through the construction of "safe-houses" and use of existing facilities on the west bank of Jefferson Parish. The original "safe-house" project was severely modified due to rising costs and was further delayed due to a conflict of interest revealed by the original contractors. There are also plans to add manual closures on the pumping stations due to the failure of the compressed air systems during Katrina's storm surge.

Much additional consideration has been given to the different problem of the flooding in Old Metairie that resulted from Jefferson Parish's reliance on the failed Orleans Parish drainage system at the 17th Street Canal and its Pumping Station No. 6. Flooding in this area south of Metairie Road between the Orleans Parish line and Causeway Boulevard was catastrophic and deep water destroyed much of the most expensive real estate in the parish. A temporary plan was devised to pool water at the Pontiff Playground and south of Airline Drive and to divert some into other Jefferson Parish drainage canals. A longer-term project to divert water from this vulnerable area into the Mississippi River has also been suggested, although its expense appears to be prohibitive. Jefferson Parish officials have also struggled to maximize the parish's ability to utilize the significantly reduced pumping capacity of the 17th Street Canal if the threat of storm surge again requires the Corps of Engineers to close the mouth of the canal.

==== Gretna controversy ====
The city of Gretna, Louisiana, the parish seat of Jefferson Parish, made news after its police force participated, along with Crescent City Connection Police and Jefferson Parish Sheriff's deputies, in a road block on the Crescent City Connection Bridge in the days following Hurricane Katrina. The purpose was to stop evacuees from crossing over into the evacuated communities on the Westbank of the Mississippi River. Gretna Police had charge of Westbank-bound lanes, while Jefferson Parish deputies controlled the east bank-bound lanes and the bridge police closed the transit lanes.

Initially, as many as 6,000 evacuees were permitted to cross and were shuttled out of the area on buses; however, that operation was eventually discontinued as available fuel supplies were exhausted. Without transportation or sufficient supplies of food or water, west bank law enforcement personnel determined that they were unable to further assist the evacuees. It was also believed at that time that federal relief efforts and supplies were soon to be concentrated in the downtown area of New Orleans. The decision to stop further evacuees from crossing the river was then made after Oakwood Center mall was looted and burned by evacuees from the east bank of New Orleans. A unified local police decision was made to lock down all areas. Due to the lack of effective communications during the crisis, some New Orleans police officers independently continued to direct evacuees to buses across the bridge that were no longer operational. The inevitable confrontation occurred on the section of the bridge controlled by the Gretna police, and warning shots were fired over the heads of desperate evacuees who had been misdirected onto the bridge.

=== Post–Katrina ===
A business report released in April 2007 found Jefferson Parish led the nation in job growth, for the quarter ending September 30, 2006, as rebuilding continued after Hurricane Katrina. Jefferson Parish president Aaron Broussard believed that Jefferson Parish would reach pre-Katrina numbers or even exceed those numbers, as residents who were still evacuated from New Orleans returned to Jefferson Parish to be closer to New Orleans as they await federal recovery money to repair their homes.

== Geography ==
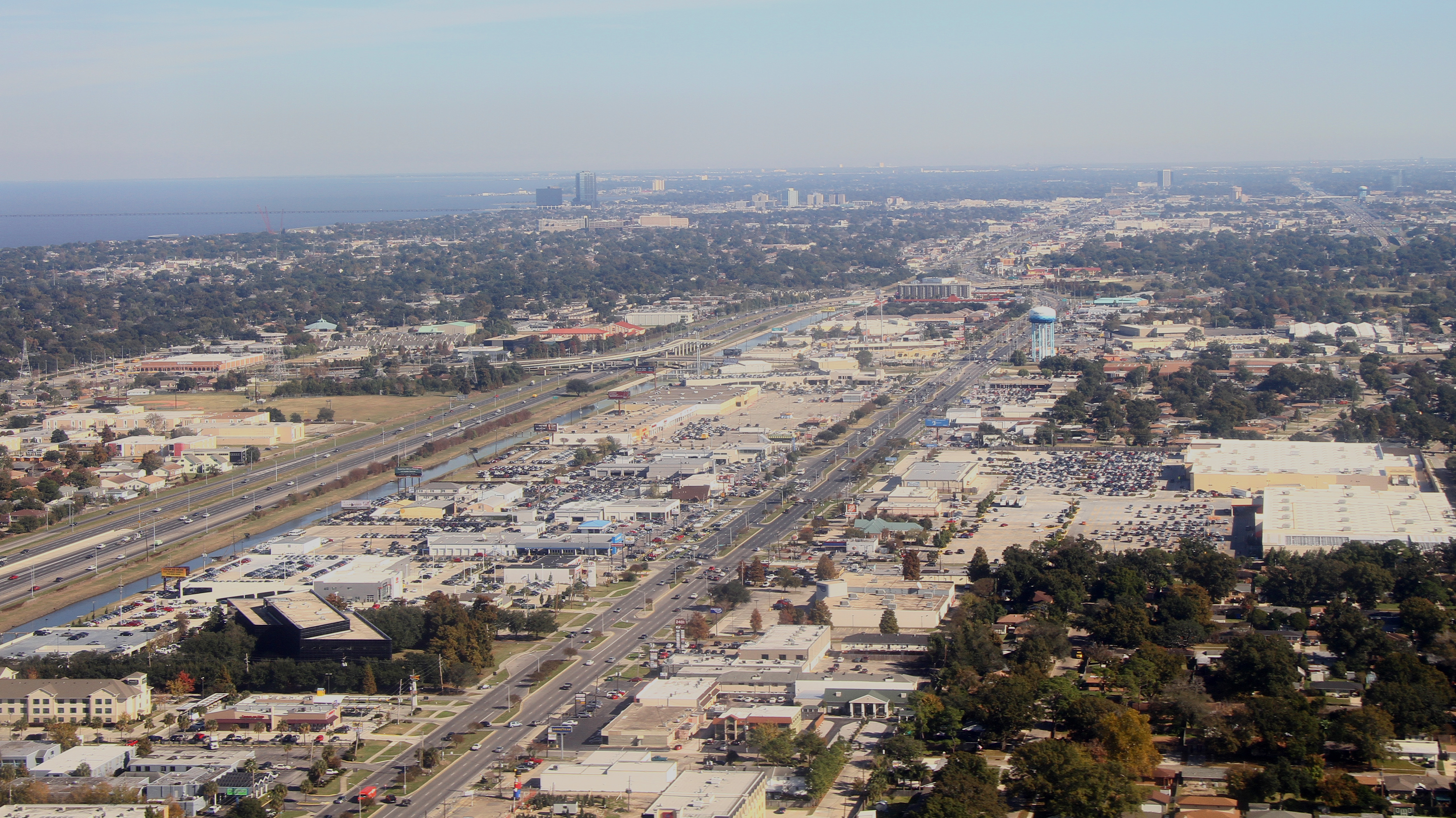
The northern suburbs of Jefferson Parish including portions of Kenner and Metairie as well as two of the major E-W thoroughfares, Veterans Boulevard and Interstate 10

According to the U.S. Census Bureau, the parish has a total area of 665 square miles (1,720 km^{2}), of which 296 square miles (770 km^{2}) is land and 370 square miles (960 km^{2}) (56%) is water.

Lake Pontchartrain is situated in the northern part of Jefferson Parish with the parish line several miles north of the southern shore, with St. Tammany Parish at its northern shore. The Mississippi River is located around the midpoint of Jefferson Parish flowing generally in a north-west to south-east direction.

Surrounding parishes include St. Tammany Parish, Louisiana at the north shore of Lake Pontchartrain, St. Charles Parish upriver to the west, Orleans Parish downriver to the east, and Plaquemines Parish downriver to the south-east. The majority of the southern half of Jefferson Parish is uninhabited marshland with one of the exceptions being the town of Grand Isle; the only roads connecting Grand Isle to the rest of Jefferson Parish run through Lafourche Parish and St. Charles Parish.

=== National protected area ===
- Jean Lafitte National Historical Park and Preserve (part, in Marrero)

=== State parks ===
- Bayou Segnette State Park
- Grand Isle State Park

=== Adjacent parishes ===
- Orleans Parish (east)
- St. Bernard Parish (east)
- Plaquemines Parish (east)
- Lafourche Parish (west)
- St. Charles Parish (west)
- St. Tammany Parish (north)

== Communities ==
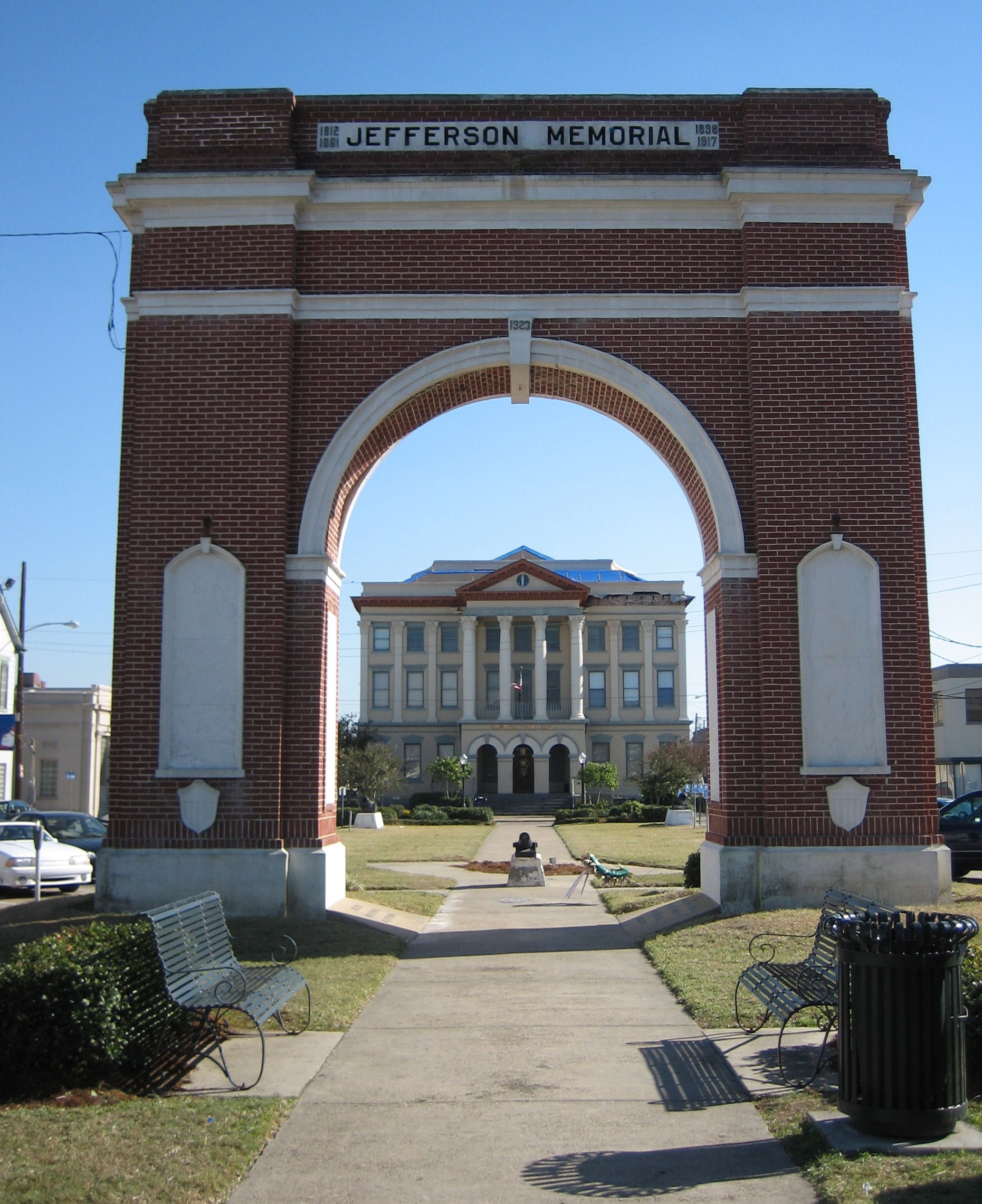
Jefferson Memorial Arch and Gretna Courthouse

=== Cities ===
- Gretna (parish seat)
- Harahan
- Kenner (largest municipality)
- Westwego

=== Towns ===
- Grand Isle
- Jean Lafitte

=== Census-designated places ===
- Avondale
- Barataria
- Bridge City
- Elmwood
- Estelle
- Harvey
- Jefferson
- Lafitte
- Marrero
- Metairie (largest unincorporated community)
- River Ridge
- Terrytown
- Timberlane
- Waggaman
- Woodmere

=== Unincorporated communities ===
- Crown Point

=== Ghost town ===
- Cheniere Caminada

== Demographics ==
Historical population
Census	Pop.	Note	%±
1830	6,846		—
1840	10,470		52.9%
1850	25,093		139.7%
1860	15,372		−38.7%
1870	17,767		15.6%
1880	12,166		−31.5%
1890	13,221		8.7%
1900	15,321		15.9%
1910	18,247		19.1%
1920	21,563		18.2%
1930	40,032		85.7%
1940	50,427		26.0%
1950	103,873		106.0%
1960	208,769		101.0%
1970	337,568		61.7%
1980	454,592		34.7%
1990	448,306		−1.4%
2000	455,466		1.6%
2010	432,552		−5.0%
2020	440,781		1.9%
2025 (est.)	431,398	▼	−2.1%
U.S. Decennial Census; 1790-1960 1900-1990; 1990-2000 2010-2019

Jefferson Parish, Louisiana – Racial and ethnic composition Note: the US Census treats Hispanic/Latino as an ethnic category. This table excludes Latinos from the racial categories and assigns them to a separate category. Hispanics/Latinos may be of any race.
Race / Ethnicity (NH = Non-Hispanic)	Pop 1980	Pop 1990	Pop 2000	Pop 2010	Pop 2020	% 1980	% 1990	% 2000	% 2010	% 2020
White alone (NH)	362,812	331,894	298,062	242,268	208,385	79.81%	74.03%	65.44%	56.01%	47.28%
Black or African American alone (NH)	62,176	78,263	103,376	112,013	115,900	13.68%	17.46%	22.70%	25.90%	26.29%
Native American or Alaska Native alone (NH)	1,391	1,634	1,808	1,629	1,317	0.31%	0.36%	0.40%	0.38%	0.30%
Asian alone (NH)	5,681	9,692	13,948	16,542	19,528	1.25%	2.16%	3.06%	3.82%	4.43%
Native Hawaiian or Pacific Islander alone (NH)	x	x	120	116	105	x	x	0.03%	0.03%	0.02%
Other race alone (NH)	760	212	563	961	2,379	0.17%	0.05%	0.12%	0.22%	0.54%
Mixed race or Multiracial (NH)	x	x	5,171	5,321	14,110	x	x	1.14%	1.23%	3.20%
Hispanic or Latino (any race)	21,772	26,611	32,418	53,702	79,057	4.79%	5.94%	7.12%	12.42%	17.94%
Total	454,592	448,306	455,466	432,552	440,781	100.00%	100.00%	100.00%	100.00%	100.00%

In 1830, the U.S. Census Bureau reported a population of 6,846; since the 2020 U.S. census, its population has grown to 440,781 people, 171,991 households, and 108,177 families residing in the parish. In 2010, the population density was 1,410 inhabitants per square mile (540/km^{2}) and there were 187,907 housing units at an average density of 613 per square mile (237/km^{2}).

In 2019, the racial and ethnic makeup of the parish was an estimated 52.6% non-Hispanic white, 26.4% Black and African American, 0.3% American Indian or Alaska Native, 4.2% Asian, <0.0% Native Hawaiian or other Pacific Islander, 0.3% some other race, 1.7% two or more races, and 14.5% Hispanic or Latino American of any race. At the 2020 U.S. census, the racial and ethnic makeup was a tabulated 47.28% non-Hispanic white, 26.29% black or African American, 0.3% American Indian or Alaska Native, 4.43% Asian, 0.02% Pacific Islander, 3.74% multiracial, and 17.94% Hispanic or Latino American of any race, representing a nationwide demographic shift of diversification from the predominant non-Hispanic white population.

Between the 2000 U.S. census and the 2010 U.S. census, the overall population of Jefferson Parish decreased while its population of Hispanic and Latino Americans increased. One theory is this was due to Hispanic and Latino Americans arriving after Hurricane Katrina in 2005 to assist the already existing Hispanic and Latin community in Jefferson Parish. As of 2011, more than 15% of the parish population was Hispanic.

At the 2019 American Community Survey, there were 169,452 households and 188,511 housing units with an owner-occupied rate of 61.2%. The median value of an owner-occupied housing unit was $188,200 and median gross rent for the parish was $972. The median household income for Jefferson Parish was $54,032 and males had a median annual income of $48,933 versus $38,442 for females. Jefferson's overall poverty rate was 15.5%, and 25.3% of children under age 18 lived at or below the poverty line.

Among the religious community in Jefferson Parish, most have identified as Christian. The predominant religious institution of Christendom in the parish is the Catholic Church, primarily served by the Roman Catholic Archdiocese of New Orleans. There is also a prominent Baptist population identifying with the Southern Baptist Convention. In Gretna, there were at least two Assemblies of God USA congregations reflecting the area's Pentecostal population as of 2022. Of note among Baptists and Pentecostals, there have also been several historically black or African American Baptist and Pentecostal churches in the parish.

== Economy ==
The economy of Jefferson Parish has often been tied to that of New Orleans, being a part of its metropolitan area.

According to the parish's 2011 Comprehensive Annual Financial Report, the top employers in the parish were:

#	Employer	# of Employees
1	Ochsner Health System	11,402
2	Jefferson Parish Public Schools	7,000
3	Superior Energy Services	4,400
4	Huntington Ingalls Industries	3,800
5	Jefferson Parish	3,671
6	ACME Truck Line	2,500
7	East Jefferson General Hospital	2,310
8	Planet Beach	2,000
9	West Jefferson Medical Center	1,849
10	Jefferson Parish Sheriff's Office	1,500

Other notable employers in the parish have been Friedrich Custom Manufacturing, a leading maker of police barricades, including the ones used by the New York City Police Department; and Starr Textiles, which relocated to the parish from New Orleans.

Since the inception of the COVID-19 pandemic in 2020, the parish has been laboring on a plan for redeveloping and diversifying its economy to attract more businesses. A five-year economic development plan was issued by the Jefferson Parish Economic Development Commission.

== Education ==
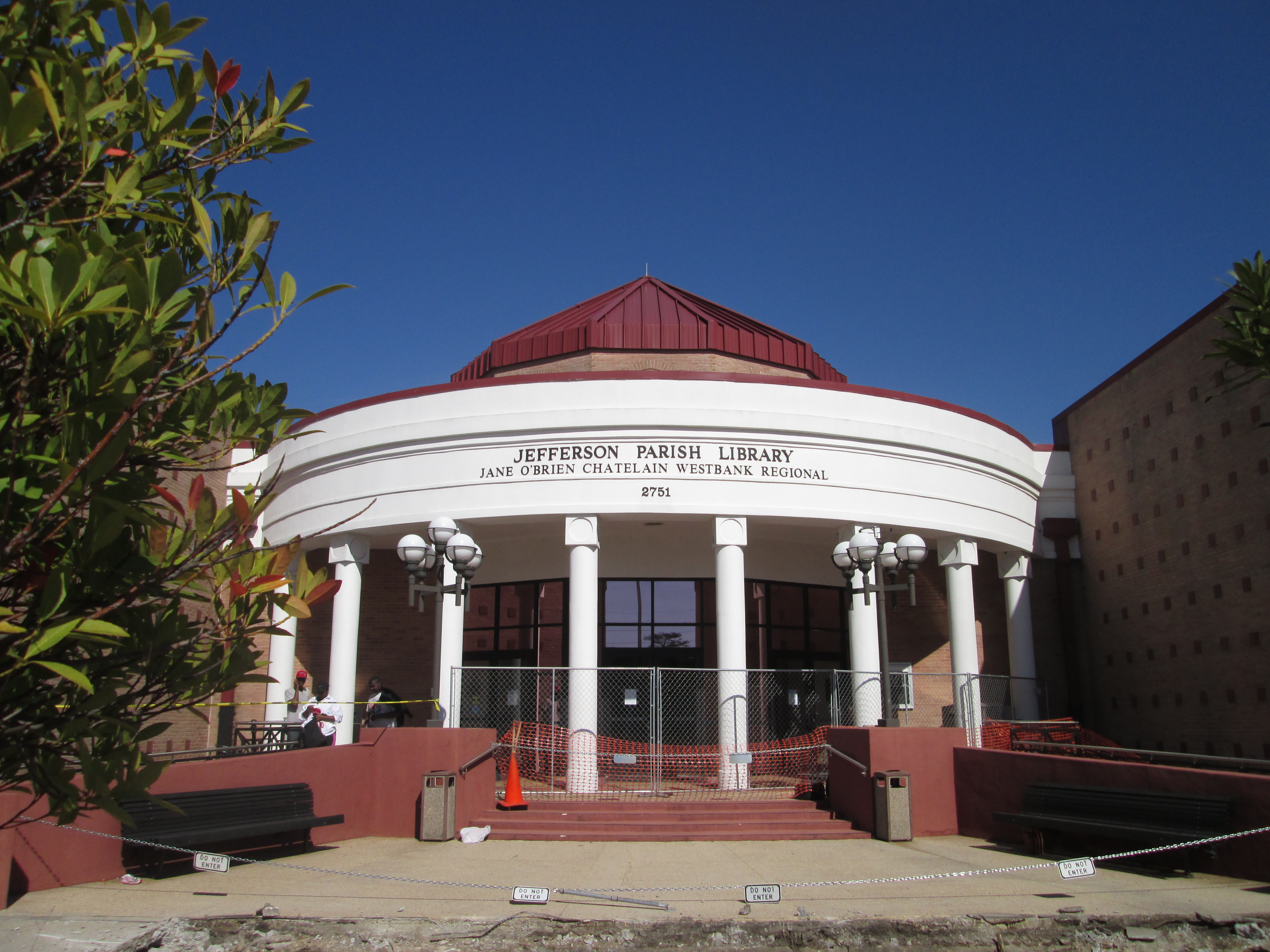
Jane O'Brein Chatelein Westbank Regional Library in Harvey

The parish's public schools are operated by Jefferson Parish Public Schools, which has boundaries paralleling those of the parish. The Jefferson Parish Library operates the public libraries.

Historically a significant number of the parish's students were in private schools, and as of 2015 Catholic schools (of the Roman Catholic Archdiocese of New Orleans) had the majority of private school students. In 2000 the parish was the American county equivalent with the second highest per capita enrollment in private school. As of October 1, 2014 there were fewer than 18,000 students in Jefferson Parish, or over 25% of the children of the ages for K-12 education, who attended private schools approved by the State of Louisiana. There were also 1,246 children in the parish who were homeschooling or who were in private schools not approved by the state.

From 2013–2014 to 2014–2015 the percentage of students in the parish's private schools declined by 4%; the Catholic schools specifically had the same percentage of enrollment decline. The non-Catholic private schools together had a 3% decline. Jessica Williams of The Times Picayune stated that the establishment of charter schools and improved options in Jefferson Parish district schools, along with Hurricane Katrina in 2005 and the Great Recession, caused decreases in private school enrollment.

== Government and infrastructure ==
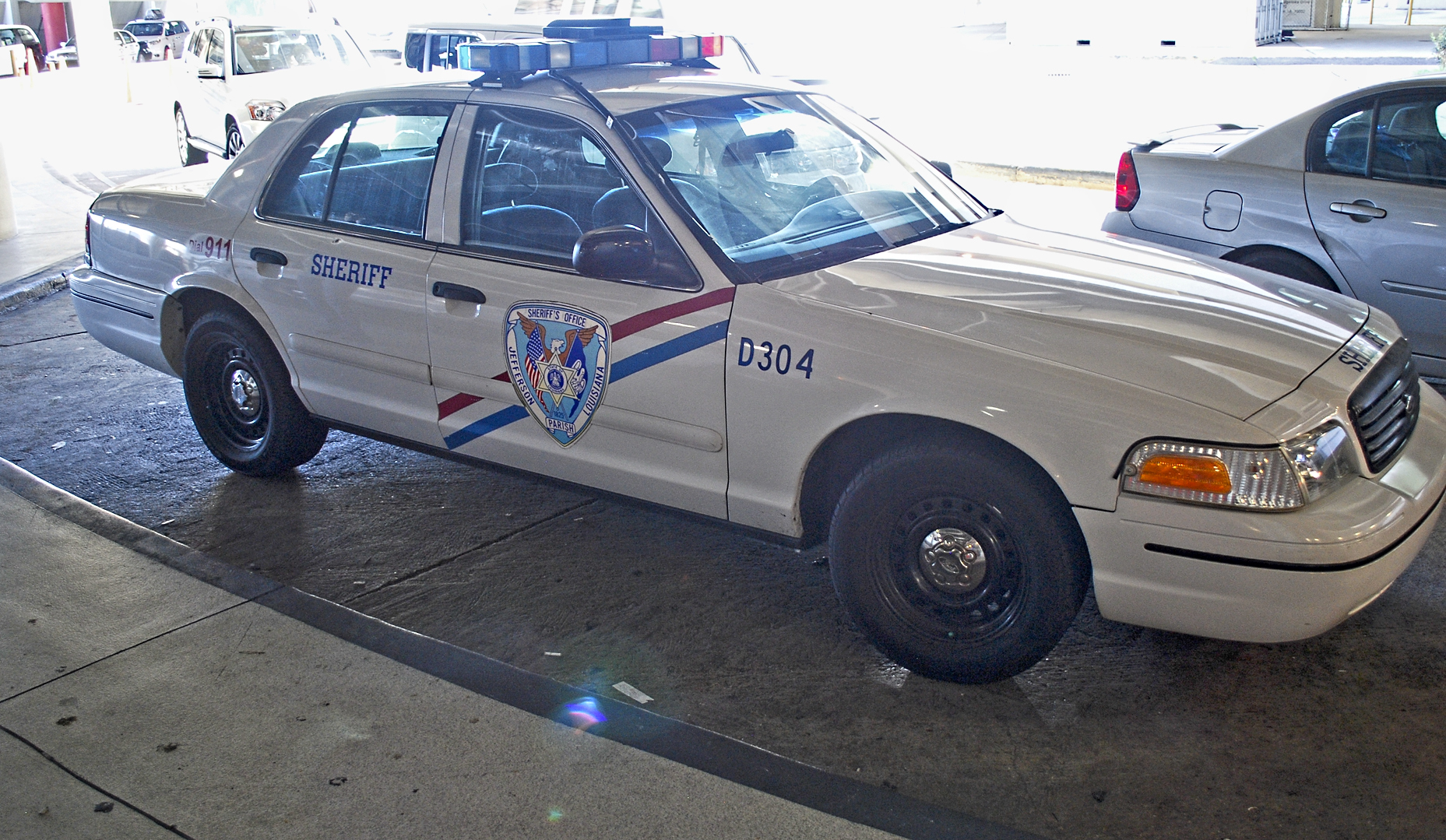
Jefferson Parish Sheriff's Office unit, 2013

Cynthia Lee-Sheng, daughter of former Sheriff Harry Lee, is the current President of Jefferson Parish, elected in 2019. Legislative authority in the parish is delegated to the Jefferson Parish Council, which consists of five district council members and two at-large members.

The Bridge City Center for Youth, a juvenile correctional facility for boys operated by the Louisiana Office of Juvenile Justice, is in Bridge City, an unincorporated area in the parish.

The Jefferson Protection & Animal Welfare Services (JPAWS), an agency of the parish government, is headquartered at the Jefferson Parish West Bank Animal Shelter in Harvey.

== Politics ==
Jefferson Parish was one of the first areas of Louisiana to turn Republican. It has not voted for a Democrat for president since John F. Kennedy in 1960. In the 2008 Presidential election, Jefferson Parish cast a majority of votes for Republican John McCain, who won 63% of the vote and 113,191 votes. Democrat Barack Obama won 36% of the votes and 65,096 votes. Although John McCain easily won Jefferson Parish, in the U.S Senate race that same year between Democrat Mary Landrieu and Republican John Neely Kennedy, Landrieu won Jefferson Parish. She won 52% of the vote and 91,966 votes. John Kennedy won 46% of the vote and 79,965 votes. Other candidates won 2% of the vote. In 2004, Republican George W. Bush won 62% of the vote and 117,882 votes. Democrat John F. Kerry won 38% of the votes and 72,136 votes.

Since 2008, in contrast to much of the rest of Louisiana shifting somewhat towards the Republicans, Jefferson Parish appears to be trending slightly Democratic at the presidential level. In 2012, Mitt Romney won it with only 58.2% of the vote, and in 2016, despite still losing the parish to Donald Trump, Hillary Clinton became the second Democrat since her husband in 1996, and only the third since Jimmy Carter in 1976, to crack 40% of the vote there. In 2020, Joe Biden cut the Republican margin to just 11 points, the lowest Republican margin since it voted for Bob Dole by just 6.7 points in 1996.

United States presidential election results for Jefferson Parish, Louisiana
Year	Republican		Democratic		Third party(ies)	
Year	No.	%	No.	%	No.	%
1912	7	0.95%	607	82.25%	124	16.80%
1916	56	5.07%	1,041	94.21%	8	0.72%
1920	192	13.43%	1,238	86.57%	0	0.00%
1924	296	13.61%	1,663	76.46%	216	9.93%
1928	742	12.23%	5,326	87.77%	0	0.00%
1932	466	5.92%	7,395	93.90%	14	0.18%
1936	705	7.22%	9,056	92.72%	6	0.06%
1940	982	10.54%	8,334	89.46%	0	0.00%
1944	1,782	14.79%	10,268	85.21%	0	0.00%
1948	2,620	16.20%	4,654	28.79%	8,894	55.01%
1952	17,090	46.88%	19,365	53.12%	0	0.00%
1956	24,324	57.23%	16,577	39.01%	1,598	3.76%
1960	17,215	27.48%	32,119	51.28%	13,304	21.24%
1964	37,161	53.88%	31,804	46.12%	0	0.00%
1968	29,478	32.19%	20,193	22.05%	41,902	45.76%
1972	75,348	73.99%	20,981	20.60%	5,512	5.41%
1976	71,787	56.28%	53,257	41.75%	2,516	1.97%
1980	99,403	64.09%	50,870	32.80%	4,838	3.12%
1984	123,997	74.69%	41,183	24.81%	843	0.51%
1988	110,942	66.68%	53,035	31.88%	2,393	1.44%
1992	100,493	53.73%	64,302	34.38%	22,243	11.89%
1996	92,820	50.32%	80,407	43.59%	11,239	6.09%
2000	105,003	58.61%	70,411	39.30%	3,737	2.09%
2004	117,882	61.50%	72,136	37.64%	1,645	0.86%
2008	113,191	62.50%	65,096	35.94%	2,833	1.56%
2012	102,536	58.15%	70,384	39.91%	3,423	1.94%
2016	100,398	55.27%	73,670	40.56%	7,571	4.17%
2020	105,949	54.69%	84,477	43.60%	3,307	1.71%
2024	98,810	55.45%	75,731	42.50%	3,664	2.06%

== Transportation ==
=== Roads ===
Jefferson Parish is served by one interstate highway and multiple U.S. and state highways.

- I-10
- US 61
- US 90
  - US 90 Bus.
    - I-49 (future) / I-910 (unsigned)
- LA 1
- LA 18
- LA 23
- LA 45
- LA 48
- LA 49
- LA 301
- LA 302
- LA 303
- LA 428
- LA 466
- LA 541
- LA 560 (branches 2 and 4)
- LA 564
- LA 574 (branches 1 and 3 to 9)
- LA 611 (branches 1, 3 and 9)
- LA 3017
- LA 3018
- LA 3046
- LA 3134
- LA 3139
- LA 3150
- LA 3151
- LA 3152
- LA 3154
- LA 3155
- LA 3257
- Lake Pontchartrain Causeway

=== Public Transportation ===
Jefferson Parish Transit (formerly known as JeT) serves the parish with 11 bus routes, an on-demand zone, and paratransit services. It also operates a special "Hurricane Evacuation System" when the parish is under evacuation orders due to an impending severe hurricane.

== Notable people ==
- John Alario, Republican state senator from Jefferson Parish and Senate President since 2012; former Democratic Speaker of the Louisiana House of Representatives (1984–1988, 1992–1996)
- Sherman A. Bernard (1925–2012), Louisiana insurance commissioner from 1972 to 1988
- Jay Chevalier, singer and politician
- Robert Billiot, member of the Louisiana House of Representatives for Jefferson Parish since 2008; former educator from Westwego
- Patrick Connick, Republican state representative from Jefferson Parish
- Ellen DeGeneres, American stand-up comedian, television host and actress born at Ochsner Hospital in Jefferson Parish in 1958
- Jim Donelon, Louisiana insurance commissioner; former state representative
- Donald Ray Jones Sr., first African American elected to the Jefferson Parish Council in the twentieth century, representing District 3 from 1991 to 2003; former member of the Jefferson Parish School Board
- David Duke, Klansman and former state representative for District 81 in Jefferson Parish
- Robert T. Garrity, Jr., former state representative for District 78 in Jefferson Parish
- Randal Gaines, African-American member of the Louisiana House for St. Charles and St. John the Baptist parishes; former resident of Kenner
- Salman "Sal" Khan, founder of Khan Academy
- Hank Lauricella (1930–2014), college football All-American for the Tennessee Volunteers; state representative and state senator
- Harry Lee (1932–2007), iconic longtime sheriff of Jefferson Parish from 1980 to 2007
- Danny Martiny, state senator from Jefferson Parish
- Newell Normand, Jefferson Parish sheriff from Harry Lee's death in 2007 to 2017
- Mel Ott, member of the Major League Baseball Hall of Fame, born in Gretna, 1909.
- Steven Seagal, Reserve Deputy Chief of Jefferson Parish
- Julie Stokes, Republican former state representative from District 79
- Chris Ullo, member of both houses of the state legislature (1972–2008)
- Amy Coney Barrett, associate justice of the Supreme Court of the United States since 2020
- Suicideboys, hip-hop duo and owners of G*59 Records

== See also ==
- Jefferson Transit
- National Register of Historic Places listings in Jefferson Parish, Louisiana
- West Return Floodwall
