= Crown Point, Louisiana =

Unincorporated community in Louisiana, U.S.

Coordinates: 29°46′20″N 90°05′07″W

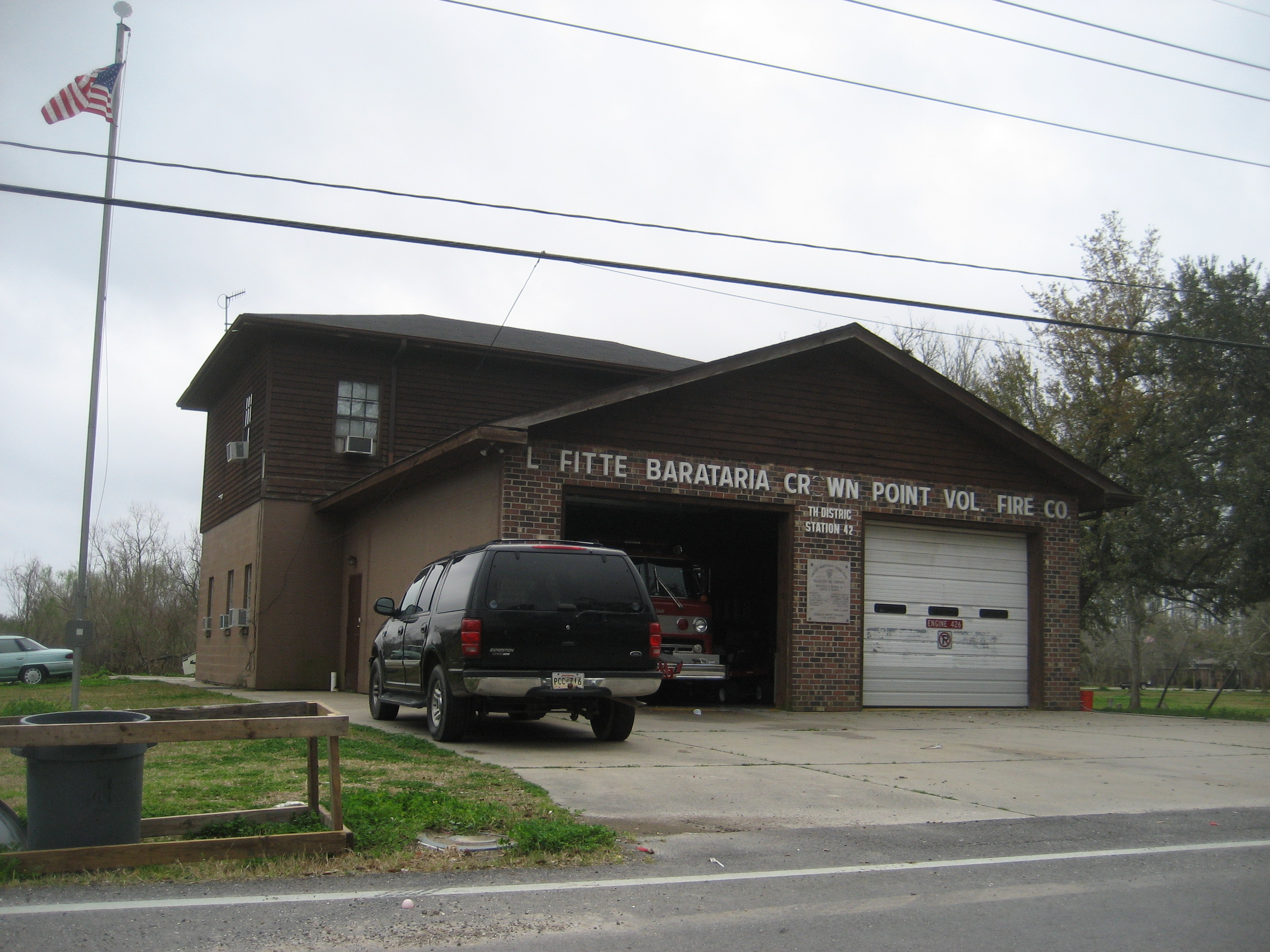
Fire Station in Crown Point, 2010

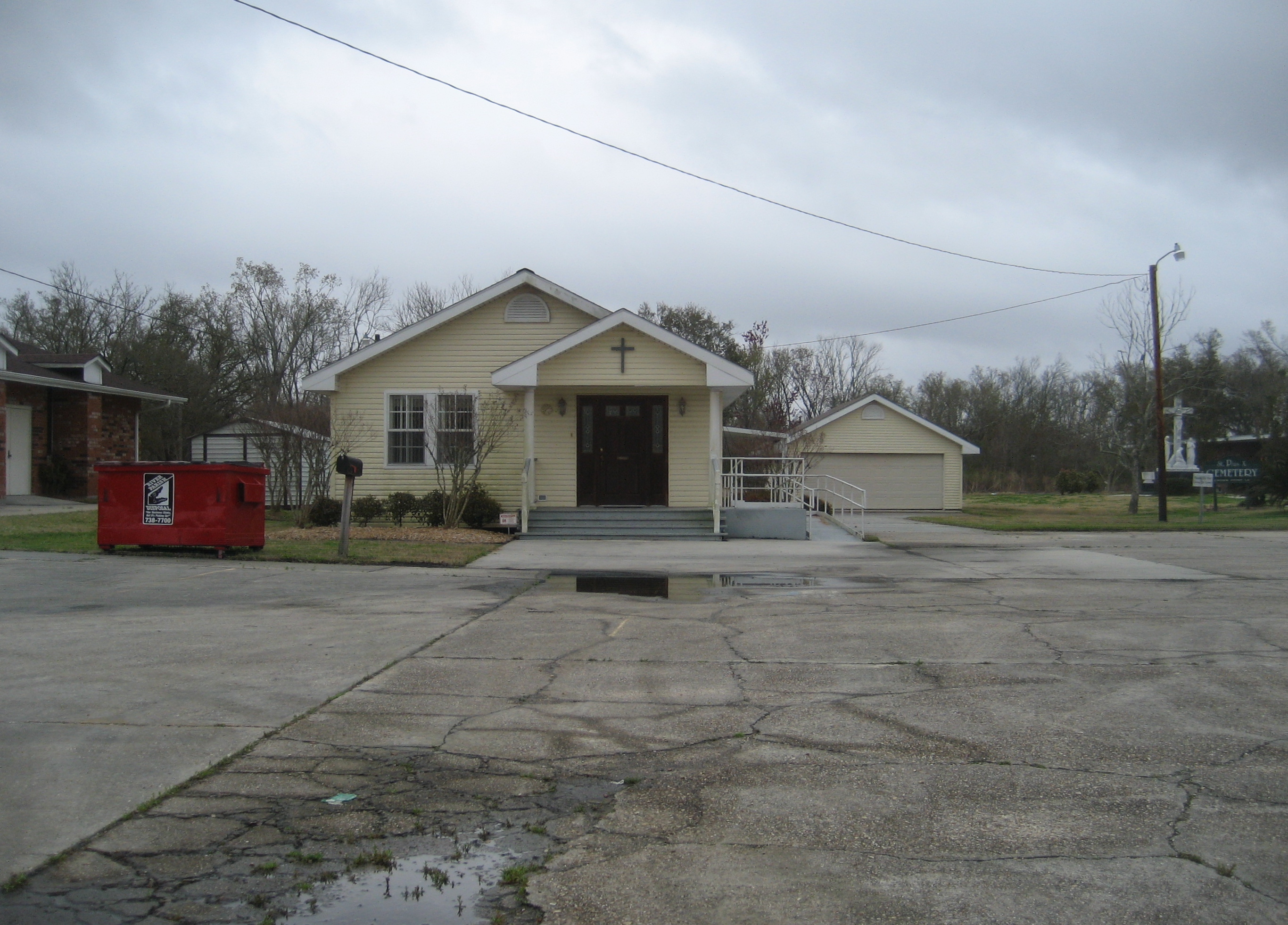
Pope Pius X Roman Catholic Church in Crown Point

Crown Point is an unincorporated community inland on the southern portion of the West Bank of Jefferson Parish, Louisiana, United States.
