= Marrero, Louisiana =

- Census-designated place
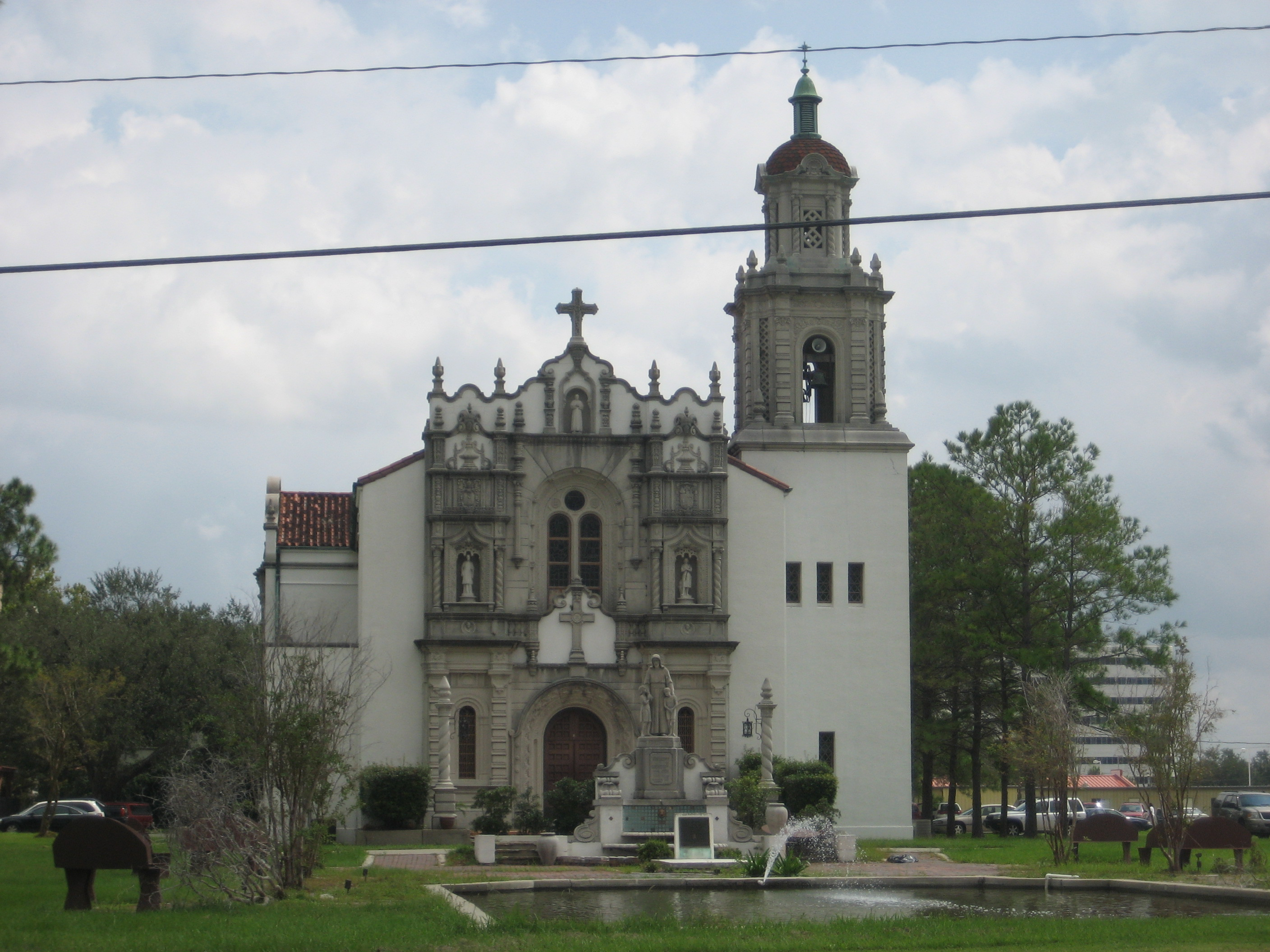
- St. John Bosco Chapel at Hope Haven, Marrero

- Location of Marrero in Louisiana
- Coordinates: 29°53′10″N 90°06′36″W
- Country: United States
- State: Louisiana
- Parish: Jefferson
- Named for: Louis H. Marrero

Area
  - Total: 7.78 sq mi (20.16 km^{2})
  - Land: 7.20 sq mi (18.65 km^{2})
  - Water: 0.59 sq mi (1.52 km^{2})

Population (2020)
  - Total: 32,382
  - Density: 4,497.8/sq mi (1,736.61/km^{2})
- Time zone: UTC−6 (CST)
  - Summer (DST): UTC−5 (CDT)
- ZIP Codes: 70072, 70073
- Area code: 504
- FIPS code: 22-48785

Marrero is a census-designated place (CDP) in Jefferson Parish, Louisiana, United States. Marrero is on the south side (referred to as the "West Bank") of the Mississippi River, within the New Orleans–Metairie–Kenner metropolitan statistical area. The population was 32,382 at the 2020 U.S. census.

== History ==
Marrero was named in honor of the Louisiana politician and founder of Marrero Land Company, Louis H. Marrero. The area was originally referred to and shown on maps as "Amesville", after the Boston businessman Oakes Ames, who purchased much of the land following the American Civil War. In February 1916, the U.S. Postmaster officially changed the name of the Post Office to "Marrero".

Louis Herman Marrero was born in Adams County, Mississippi, on July 17, 1847. When he was a child his family moved to St. Bernard Parish, Louisiana. During his school years at Jackson, Louisiana, the American Civil War began, and Marrero joined Captain Scott's Command, later known as the 25th Louisiana Regiment.

== Geography ==
Location of Marrero, across the Mississippi from uptown New Orleans, south-southwest of French Quarter

Marrero is located west of the Intracoastal Canal on the Mississippi River, at coordinates 29°53′10″N 90°6′36″W (29.886017, -90.109930). It is bordered to the east by Harvey, to the west by Westwego, and to the north, across the Mississippi, by New Orleans.

According to the United States Census Bureau, the Marrero CDP has a total area of 8.6 square miles (22.3 km^{2}), of which 8.0 sq mi (20.6 km^{2}) are land and 0.66 sq mi (1.7 km^{2}), or 7.66%, are water.

== Demographics ==
Historical population
Census	Pop.	Note	%±
1970	29,015		—
1980	36,548		26.0%
1990	36,671		0.3%
2000	36,165		−1.4%
2010	33,141		−8.4%
2020	32,382		−2.3%
U.S. Decennial Census; 1960 1970 1980; 1990 2000 2010 2020

Marrero first appeared as an unincorporated community in the 1970 U.S. census; and as a census designated place in the 1980 United States census.

Marrero CDP, Louisiana – Racial and ethnic composition Note: the U.S. Census Bureau treats Hispanic/Latino as an ethnic category. This table excludes Latinos from the racial categories and assigns them to a separate category. Hispanics/Latinos may be of any race.
Race / Ethnicity (NH = Non-Hispanic)	Pop 2000	Pop 2010	Pop 2020	% 2000	% 2010	% 2020
White alone (NH)	16,450	13,049	10,330	45.49%	39.37%	31.90%
Black or African American alone (NH)	17,183	16,186	16,230	47.51%	48.84%	50.12%
Native American or Alaska Native alone (NH)	131	206	160	0.36%	0.62%	0.49%
Asian alone (NH)	886	1,545	1,773	2.45%	4.66%	5.48%
Native Hawaiian or Pacific Islander alone (NH)	15	2	4	0.04%	0.01%	0.01%
Other race alone (NH)	18	24	108	0.05%	0.07%	0.33%
Mixed race or Multiracial (NH)	355	353	1,001	0.98%	1.07%	3.09%
Hispanic or Latino (any race)	1,127	1,776	2,776	3.12%	5.36%	8.57%
Total	36,165	33,141	32,382	100.00%	100.00%	100.00%

The 2019 American Community Survey estimated 30,894 people lived in the CDP, down from 33,141 at the 2010 U.S. census. In 2020, the population was 32,382. At the 2019 census estimates, the racial and ethnic makeup was 50.1% Black or African American, 37.2% non-Hispanic white, 0.4% American Indian and Alaska Native, 5.2% Asian, 0.2% some other race, 2.0% multiracial, and 4.9% Hispanic and Latino American of any race. Per the following census in 2020, the composition was 50.12% non-Hispanic Black or African American, 31.9% non-Hispanic white, 0.49% non-Hispanic American Indian and Alaska Native, 5.48% non-Hispanic Asian, 0.01% non-Hispanic Pacific Islander, 3.42% non-Hispanic two or more races, and 8.57% Hispanic or Latino American of any race; this reflects the greater diversification of the United States at the time of this census, becoming less predominantly non-Hispanic white. In 2019, the median household income was $44,866 and 21% of the population lived at or below the poverty line.

== Education ==
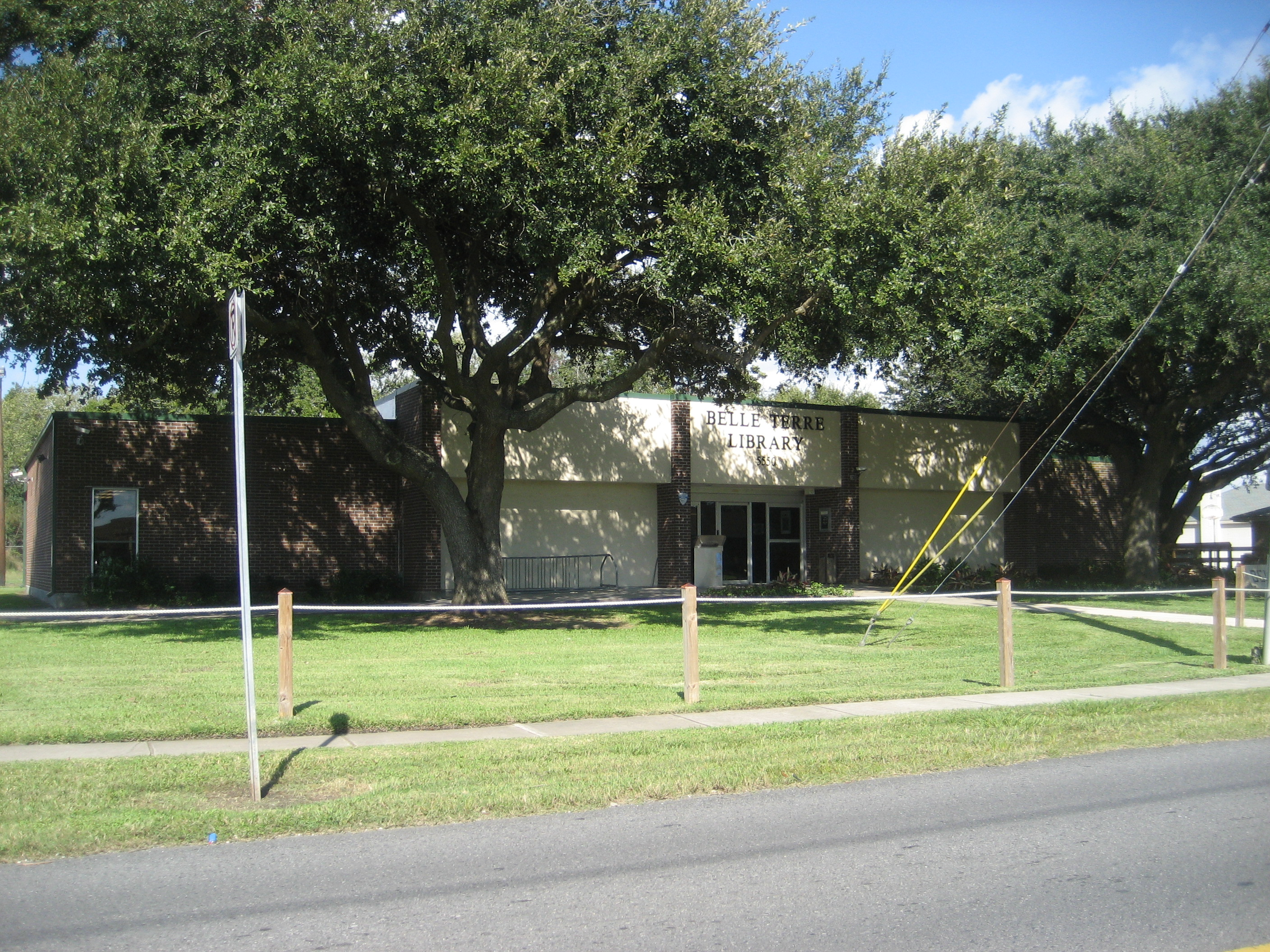
Belle Terre Library in Marrero

Marrero's public schools are operated by the Jefferson Parish Public School System.

Zoned schools include:

High Schools:

- L.W. Higgins High School
- John Ehret High School (Marrero address, outside of the CDP limits)

L.H. Marrero Middle School is in Marrero. Parts of Marrero are zoned to Worley Middle in Westwego, Louisiana and Truman Middle in Marrero.

Elementary schools in Marrero include:

- Judge Lionel R. Collins Montessori School
  - It was previously called Ames Montessori School. In 2011 the school board voted to rename it after an African-American judge who died in 1988. He was the first African-American man elected to a Jefferson Parish-level political office.
- Lincoln Elementary School for the Arts
- Miller Wall Elementary School
- Ella C. Pittman Elementary School

Schools outside of Marrero serving portions include Vic A. Pitre Elementary School in Westwego, Estelle Elementary in Estelle.

In regards to advanced studies academies, some residents are zoned to the Marrero Academy and some are zoned to the Gretna Academy.

The Roman Catholic Archdiocese of New Orleans operates two high schools:

- Archbishop Shaw High School, all-boys school
- Academy of Our Lady, all-girls school

Jefferson Parish Library operates the Belle Terre Library in Marrero.

== Notable people ==
- Sherman A. Bernard (1925–2012), politician
- Robert Billiot, former Marrero resident; state representative for Jefferson Parish; retired educator in Westwego
- Marty Booker, NFL player for Chicago Bears, Miami Dolphins, and Atlanta Falcons
- Paul Carr, actor
- Chimdi Chekwa, football player
- Patrick Connick, politician
- Ryan Clark, NFL player
- Brett P. Giroir, Assistant Secretary for Health at HSS, 2018-
- Stephen Jackson, composer
- Tory James, athlete
- Norman Jefferson, former NFL player
- Mickey Joseph, former football quarterback and college football coach
- Vance Joseph, defensive coordinator for the Denver Broncos
- Kordell Stewart, former NFL player for Pittsburgh Steelers
- Chris Ullo, politician
- Reggie Wayne, football player for Indianapolis Colts
- Scrim, member of $uicideboy$ rap duo

== See also ==
- West Jefferson Medical Center
