= Louisiana's 84th House of Representatives district =

American legislative district

Louisiana's 84th State House of Representatives district
Representative
| Timothy Kerner Sr. R–Jean Lafitte |

Louisiana's 84th House of Representatives district is one of 105 Louisiana House of Representatives districts. It is currently represented by Republican Timothy Kerner Sr.

== Geography ==
HD84 is located entirely within Jefferson Parish, and its south border reaches the Gulf of Mexico. It includes the Town of Jean-Laffite, and the Census-designated places of Harvey, Marrero, and Estelle.

== Election results ==
| Year | Winning candidate | Party | Percent | Opponent | Party | Percent | Opponent | Party | Percent | Opponent | Party | Percent |
|---|---|---|---|---|---|---|---|---|---|---|---|---|
| 2011 | Patrick Connick | Republican | 100% | | | | | | | | | |
| 2015 | Patrick Connick | Republican | 100% | | | | | | | | | |
| 2019 | Timothy Kerner Sr. | Republican | 51.3% | Chris Breaux | Republican | 24.4% | Russell Autry | Republican | 18.4% | Don Carmadelle | Republican | 5.3% |
| 2023 | Timothy Kerner Sr. | Republican | Canceled | | | | | | | | | |
