= Larry Morrow =

American serial entrepreneur and author

- Education: Tulane University
- Occupation: Entrepreneur
- Website: larry-morrow.com

Larry Morrow is an American serial entrepreneur and author.

== Early life and education ==
Larry Morrow was born on January 9th 1991. Morrow is of African-American ethnicity and grew up in a Korean-American family in New Orleans, Louisiana. He was raised by his mom and Korean grandmother both of whom were entrepreneurs. He attended St. Augustine High School and graduated from Bonnabel High. He also attended Tulane University but dropped out to support his family.

== Career ==
Morrow started his career in New Orleans as an entrepreneur. He founded "Larry Morrow Events", an entertainment business platform that has featured celebrities such as Diddy, Floyd Mayweather, Drake, Rick Ross, Meek Mill and others. Morrow also launched "Larry Morrow Properties" and a New Orleans–based restaurant named "Morrow's". He wrote and published a self-help book captioned All Bets On Me – the Risks and Rewards of Becoming an Entrepreneur. Larry Morrow established several venues and restaurants including Morrow's, Morrow's Steak, Sun Chong, Hide-Seek, Treehouse, Spicy Mango, and Monday. Larry Morrow created the Southern Hospitality Weekend which is a multi-day conference designed to bring together operators, entrepreneurs, investors, and cultural leaders from all around the world for an array of networking opportunities. The inaugural event was held January 16th-18th 2026. The speaker lineup for the Southern Hospitality Weekend included Rick Ross, Marc C Morial, and Pinky Cole Hayes.

== Awards and recognition ==
- 2018 – Black Enterprise – BeModern Man
- 2019 – Biz New Orleans – New & Notable Award
- 2024 – American Cancer Society Cure Champion of the Year
- 2025 – American Cancer Society Honorary Chair
