= Barataria, Louisiana =

- Census-designated place
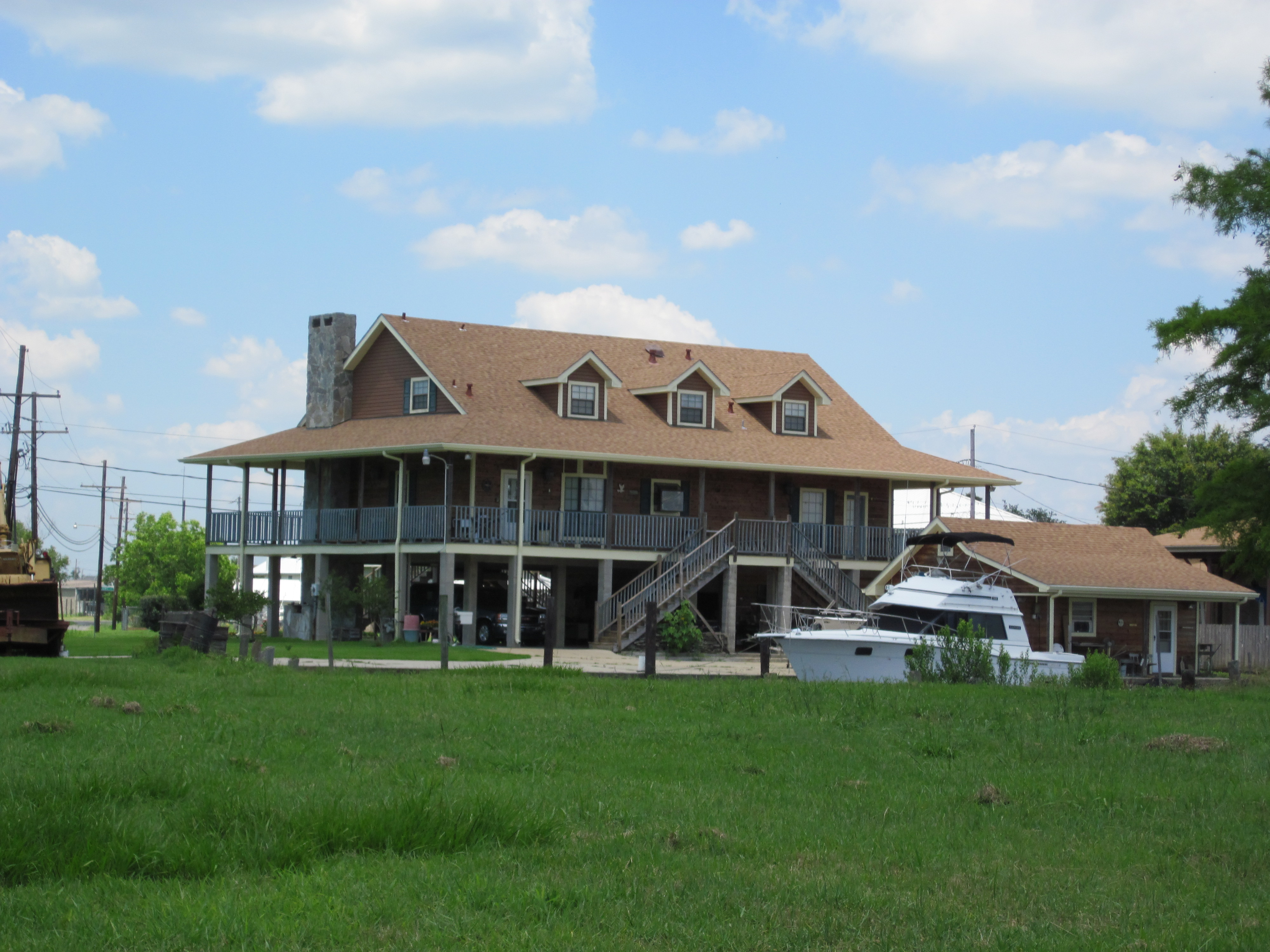
- Raised house in Barataria

- Location of Barataria in Louisiana
- Coordinates: 29°42′54″N 90°06′58″W
- Country: United States
- State: Louisiana
- Parish: Jefferson

Area
  - Total: 4.80 sq mi (12.44 km^{2})
  - Land: 4.29 sq mi (11.10 km^{2})
  - Water: 0.52 sq mi (1.34 km^{2})
- Elevation: 3 ft (0.91 m)

Population (2020)
  - Total: 1,057
  - Density: 246.7/sq mi (95.24/km^{2})
- Time zone: UTC-6 (CST)
  - Summer (DST): UTC-5 (CDT)
- ZIP Code: 70036
- Area code: 504
- FIPS code: 22-04300

Barataria (/ˌbɛərəˈtɛəriə/ BAIR-ə-TAIR-ee-ə) is a census-designated place (CDP) in Jefferson Parish, Louisiana, United States. The population was 1,057 in 2020. It is part of the New Orleans–Metairie–Kenner metropolitan statistical area.

== Etymology ==
The name comes from Bayou Barataria, a tributary of Barataria Bay which in turn took its name from the fictional island awarded to Sancho Panza to govern in Part II of the Spanish classic novel Don Quixote by Miguel de Cervantes.

== Geography ==
Barataria is located in south-central Jefferson Parish at 29°42′54″N 90°6′58″W (29.715121, -90.116024), on the west side of Bayou Barataria and just east of Lake Salvador. It is bordered to the east, across Bayou Barataria, by the town of Jean Lafitte and the unincorporated community of Lafitte. Barataria is 23 miles (37 km) south of New Orleans.

According to the United States Census Bureau, the Barataria CDP has a total area of 4.8 square miles (12.4 km^{2}), of which 4.3 square miles (11.1 km^{2}) are land and 0.50 square miles (1.3 km^{2}), or 10.75%, are water.

== Demographics ==
Historical population
Census	Pop.	Note	%±
1980	1,123		—
1990	1,160		3.3%
2000	1,333		14.9%
2010	1,109		−16.8%
2020	1,057		−4.7%
U.S. Decennial Census; 1950 1960 1970 1980; 1990 2000 2010

Barataria first appeared as a census designated place in the 1980 U.S. census.

Barataria CDP, Louisiana – Racial and ethnic composition Note: the U.S. Census Bureau treats Hispanic/Latino as an ethnic category. This table excludes Latinos from the racial categories and assigns them to a separate category. Hispanics/Latinos may be of any race.
Race / Ethnicity (NH = Non-Hispanic)	Pop 2000	Pop 2010	Pop 2020	% 2000	% 2010	% 2020
White alone (NH)	1,142	980	891	85.67%	88.37%	84.30%
Black or African American alone (NH)	148	67	43	11.10%	6.04%	4.07%
Native American or Alaska Native alone (NH)	8	13	8	0.60%	1.17%	0.76%
Asian alone (NH)	0	1	1	0.00%	0.09%	0.09%
Native Hawaiian or Pacific Islander alone (NH)	0	0	0	0.00%	0.00%	0.00%
Other race alone (NH)	0	0	1	0.00%	0.00%	0.09%
Mixed race or Multiracial (NH)	10	24	72	0.75%	2.16%	6.81%
Hispanic or Latino (any race)	25	24	41	1.88%	2.16%	3.88%
Total	1,333	1,109	1,057	100.00%	100.00%	100.00%

Barataria first appeared in the 1850 U.S. census with a total recorded population of 1,176. According to the 2020 United States census, there were 1,057 people, 428 households, and 350 families residing in the CDP, down from the 2019 American Community Survey estimate of 1,200 people living in the CDP, and from 1,109 at the 2010 U.S. census. In 2019, the racial and ethnic makeup was 80.7% non-Hispanic white, 7.8% Black or African American, 0.3% American Indian and Alaska Native, and 11.3% two or more races. In 2020, its composition was 84.3% non-Hispanic white, 4.07% Black or African American, 0.76% American Indian and Alaska Native, 0.09% Asian, 6.91% multiracial or of some other race, and 3.88% Hispanic and Latino American of any race. The median household income was $49,931, and 3.3% of the population lived at or below the poverty line in 2019.

== Education ==
Residents are zoned to Jefferson Parish Public Schools.

Residents from K-5 are zoned to Leo E. Kerner Elementary School (formerly Lafitte Elementary School). Those from 6-12 are zoned to Fisher Middle-High School.

== See also ==
- Barataria Bay
- Jean Lafitte National Historical Park and Preserve - Barataria Preserve
