= Thomas Jefferson High School (Gretna, Louisiana) =

High school in Louisiana, United States

Coordinates: 29.9105°N 90.0459°W

Location
- 910 Gretna Blvd. Gretna, Louisiana 70053; United States

Information
- School type: Magnet
- Founder: Jefferson Public School Board
- Status: Operating
- School district: Jefferson Parish School District
- Principal: Erika Russell
- Staff: 28.16 (FTE)
- Grades: 6–12
- Enrollment: 541 (2023–2024)
- Student to teacher ratio: 19.21
- Colors: California blue, gray, and black
- Athletics conference: LHSAA District 9-2A
- Mascot: Jaguars
- Nickname: Big Blue
- Website: www.jpschools.org/jeffersonhigh

Thomas Jefferson High School for Advanced Studies, more commonly known as simply Thomas Jefferson High School, is a public high school in the city of Gretna in Jefferson Parish, Louisiana. It has consistently ranked among the state's best public high schools and is also among the most diverse It is part of the Jefferson Parish Public Schools system. The school had 367 students in 2016. It has 67 percent minority enrollment. The school is at 910 Gretna Boulevard.

The school mascot is a jaguar and the colors are California blue, gray, and black.

In 2023 the school was to move to the former Gretna Middle School.

== Athletics ==
Thomas Jefferson High athletics competes in the LHSAA.

Sports programs include:

=== Men's ===
- Baseball
- Basketball
- Football
- Soccer
- Swimming
- Track & Field
- Wrestling

=== Women's ===
- Basketball
- Soccer
- Softball
- Swimming
- Tennis
- Volleyball
