= Tim Kerner =

American politician

Timothy Kerner
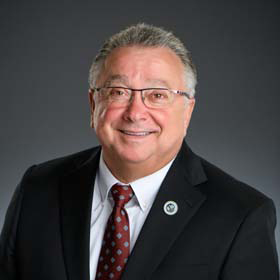

Member of the Louisiana House of Representatives from the 84th district
- Incumbent
- Assumed office January 13, 2020
- Preceded by: Patrick Connick

Mayor of Jean Lafitte
- In office 1992–2020
- Succeeded by: Timothy Kerner Jr.

Personal details
- Party: Republican
- Children: 3

Timothy P. Kerner is an American politician serving as a member of the Louisiana House of Representatives from the 84th district. Elected in November 2019, he assumed office on January 13, 2020.

== Early life and education ==
Kerner was born in Jean Lafitte, Louisiana. He graduated from Fisher Middle-High School.

== Career ==
Tim Kerner Sr. began his career working in the shrimp industry in his home town of Jean Lafitte and later served in the Jefferson Parish Sheriff's Office. He then served 7 terms as mayor of Jean Lafitte from 1992 to 2020. During his tenure as mayor, Kerner led a number of important civic and infrastructure improvements, including: a visitor center, museum, 1,300-seat auditorium, library, civic center, baseball park, senior center, medical clinic, art gallery, and nature trail. A major accomplishment as mayor was the creation of the Lafitte Area Independent Levee District that eventually secured over $300 million in funds to build tidal protection levees and flood walls to protect the communities of Jean Lafitte, Lafitte, Crown Point and Barataria. Kerner was elected to the Louisiana House of Representatives in November 2019 and assumed office on January 13, 2020. His son Timothy Kerner Jr. was elected as mayor of the town in 2020.

== Personal life ==
Kerner and his wife, Darla, have three children. His son, Timothy Kerner Jr., is mayor of Jean Lafitte.
