= Grand Isle School =

School in Louisiana, United States

Grand Isle High School

Location
- 149 Ludwig Lane; Grand Isle, (Jefferson Parish), Louisiana 70358; United States; 29.2330472°N 89.9986031°W

Information
- Type: Public high school
- School district: Jefferson Parish School Board
- Principal: Amie Magnon
- Staff: 21.73 (on an FTE basis)
- Enrollment: 99 (2023–24)
- Student to teacher ratio: 4.56
- Colors: Red and gold
- Mascot: Trojan
- Nickname: Trojans
- Website: grandisle.jpschools.org

The Grand Isle School is a PreK-12 school in Grand Isle, a community in unincorporated Jefferson Parish, Louisiana. It is a part of Jefferson Parish Public Schools.
