= Lafitte, Louisiana =

- Census-designated place
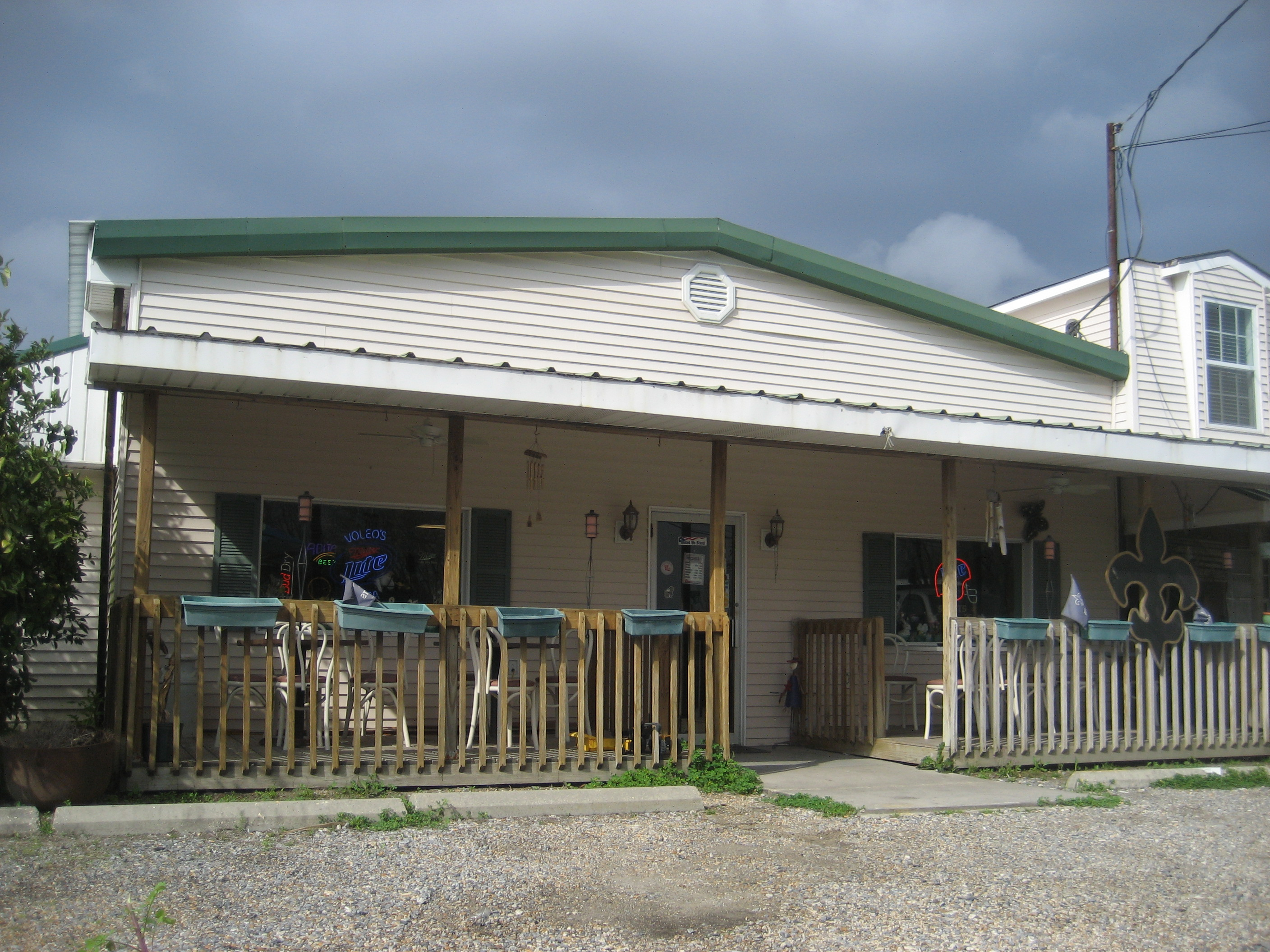
- Voleo's Seafood restaurant in Lafitte

- Location of Lafitte in Louisiana
- Coordinates: 29°40′39″N 90°06′19″W
- Country: United States
- State: Louisiana
- Parish: Jefferson

Area
  - Total: 6.41 sq mi (16.60 km^{2})
  - Land: 4.84 sq mi (12.54 km^{2})
  - Water: 1.57 sq mi (4.06 km^{2})

Population (2020)
  - Total: 1,014
  - Density: 209.5/sq mi (80.88/km^{2})
- Time zone: UTC-6 (CST)
  - Summer (DST): UTC-5 (CDT)
- ZIP Code: 70067
- Area code: 504
- FIPS code: 22-40840

Lafitte is an unincorporated community and census-designated place (CDP) in Jefferson Parish, Louisiana, United States. The population was 972 at the 2010 census, and 816 in 2019. In 2020, its population increased to 1,014 people. It is part of the New Orleans–Metairie–Kenner metropolitan statistical area. Lafitte is located at the southern end of Louisiana Highway 45 along Bayou Barataria, and fishing is a major part of the local economy and culture.

== Geography ==
Lafitte is located at 29°40′39″N 90°6′19″W (29.677566, -90.105386). It is 27 miles (43 km) by road south of New Orleans. Lafitte is bordered to the north by the town of Jean Lafitte, and to the west, across Bayou Barataria, by unincorporated Barataria. According to the United States Census Bureau, the Lafitte CDP has a total area of 6.4 square miles (16.6 km^{2}), of which 4.8 square miles (12.5 km^{2}) are land and 1.6 square miles (4.1 km^{2}), or 24.57%, are water.

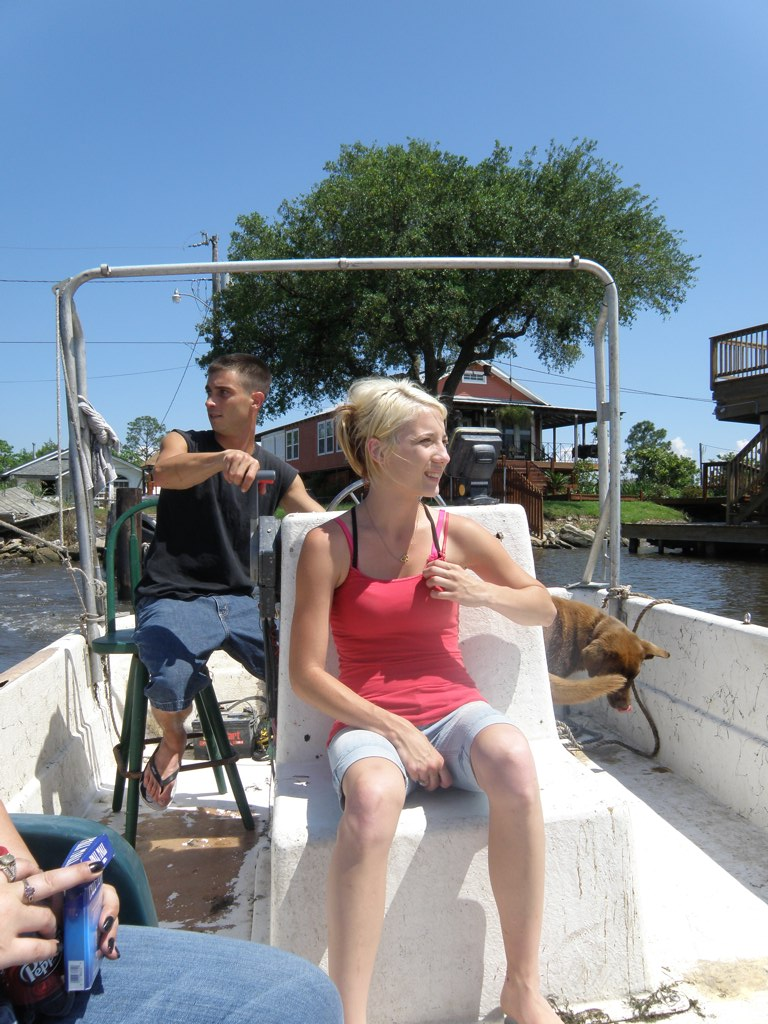
On a shrimp boat at Lafitte

== Demographics ==
Historical population
Census	Pop.	Note	%±
1970	1,223		—
1980	1,312		7.3%
1990	1,507		14.9%
2000	1,576		4.6%
2010	972		−38.3%
2020	1,014		4.3%
U.S. Decennial Census; 1950 1960 1970 1980; 1990 2000 2010

Lafitte first appeared as an unincorporated place in the 1970 U.S. census; and as a census designated place in the 1980 United States census.

Lafitte CDP, Louisiana – Racial and ethnic composition Note: the U.S. Census Bureau treats Hispanic/Latino as an ethnic category. This table excludes Latinos from the racial categories and assigns them to a separate category. Hispanics/Latinos may be of any race.
Race / Ethnicity (NH = Non-Hispanic)	Pop 2000	Pop 2010	Pop 2020	% 2000	% 2010	% 2020
White alone (NH)	1,467	890	820	93.08%	91.56%	80.87%
Black or African American alone (NH)	18	12	8	1.14%	1.23%	0.79%
Native American or Alaska Native alone (NH)	33	22	18	2.09%	2.26%	1.78%
Asian alone (NH)	8	9	16	0.51%	0.93%	1.58%
Native Hawaiian or Pacific Islander alone (NH)	0	0	0	0.00%	0.00%	0.00%
Other race alone (NH)	0	1	0	0.00%	0.10%	0.00%
Mixed race or Multiracial (NH)	22	15	93	1.40%	1.54%	9.17%
Hispanic or Latino (any race)	28	23	59	1.78%	2.37%	5.82%
Total	1,576	972	1,014	100.00%	100.00%	100.00%

The 2019 American Community Survey estimated 816 people lived in the CDP, down from 972 at the 2010 U.S. census. At the 2020 United States census, there were 1,014 people, 316 households, and 222 families residing in the CDP, up from the 2019 census estimates. In 2019, the racial and ethnic makeup was 89% non-Hispanic white, and 11% two or more races; the 2020 census determined 80.87% of the population was non-Hispanic white, 0.79% Black or African American, 1.78% Native American, 1.58% Asian, 9.17% two or more races, and 5.82% Hispanic or Latino American of any race; this has been in contrast to its once predominantly non-Hispanic white population as the U.S. diversifies overall. According to the 2019 estimates, the median household income was $58,375 and 19.2% lived at or below the poverty line.

== Education ==
Lafitte residents are zoned to Jefferson Parish Public Schools.

Residents in K–5 are zoned to Lafitte Elementary School. Grades 6–12 are zoned to Fisher Middle-High School.
