= Alfred Bonnabel High School =

Alfred T. Bonnabel High School

Location
- 2801 Bruin Drive; Kenner, Louisiana 70065-4707; United States; 30.0106°N 90.227°W

Information
- Type: Public
- Founded: 1973
- School district: Jefferson Parish Public Schools
- Principal: Katrina Torrado (2024-present)
- Faculty: 80.3
- Teaching staff: 113.16 (on an FTE basis)
- Grades: 9–12
- Enrollment: 2,570 (2023–2024)
- Student to teacher ratio: 22.71
- Colors: Black and gold
- Mascot: Bruin
- Nickname: Bruins
- Website: www.jpschools.org/bonnabel

Alfred T. Bonnabel Magnet Academy High School is a comprehensive public high school in Kenner, Louisiana, United States, and is part of Jefferson Parish Public Schools, the largest public school system in Louisiana. Bonnabel is the only comprehensive school district-operated high school in Kenner, and its attendance boundary includes: most of Kenner and parts of Metairie.

== History ==
East Jefferson High School had been using "A.M. & P.M. platoon shifts" where the first classes went to school from 6 a.m. until noon, and the second shift went from 12:30 to 6:30. In 1973, they started building a new all male school named Alfred T. Bonnabel High. Even though it would not be completed until 2 years later, they decided to call the morning shift “Bonnabel” and the afternoon shift “East Jefferson”. The following year the two shifts flip-flopped. The third year the student that had been using the name “Bonnabel” moved into their new building just north of I-10 between David Dr. and Williams Blvd. An addition planned for 1976, called Roger B. Derby High School, was intended to end the splitting of the student bodies.

In 1975 the East Bank Guide Jefferson Parish Times Advertiser of Metairie, Louisiana reported that racial conflicts resulted in student fighting during the 1974-1975 school year.

In 2023 the school absorbed a portion of the attendance boundary of the closed Grace King High School.

== Campus ==
The school is on a 30-acre (12 ha) property in Kenner. Ray Ferrand, the principal in 2002, said during that year that, as paraphrased by Megan Kamerick of the New Orleans CityBusiness, the school could be "overwhelming" for first time students. Bonnabel's main campus includes multiple academic buildings spread across, including a building dedicated exclusively to Freshman students. The campus also consists of a full sized baseball and softball field, field house, and gym. A memorial garden for a student killed in 2016 was also dedicated in May 2016 by the class of 2017 and administrators

== Demographics ==
Bonnabel High School is a Title I school that has 1421 students (530 9th grade, 337 10th grade, 311 11th grade, 243 12th grade). As of 2025, the student body is 60% Hispanic, 26% Black, 10% White 2% Asian or Pacific Islander and 2% Other. 664 students are eligible for free lunch.

In 2002, it had about 1,750 students.

In 1975, about 10% of the students were Black.

== Student culture ==
An anti-crime club was established at the school in 1973.

== Athletics ==
Bonnabel High athletics competes in the LHSAA.

== See also ==
- List of high schools in Louisiana
