= Grand Isle, Louisiana =

- Town
- Town of Grand Isle
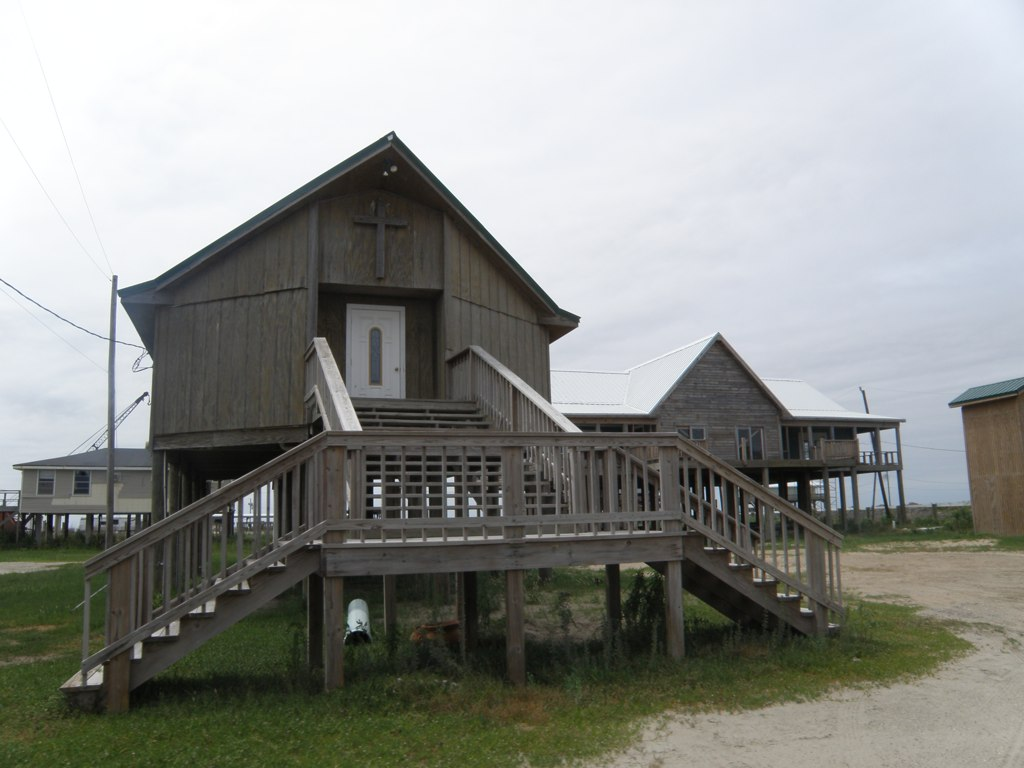
- Lighthouse Christian Fellowship Church

- Seal

- Location of Grand Isle in Jefferson Parish

- Location of Louisiana in the United States
- Coordinates: 29°14′N 90°00′W
- Country: United States
- State: Louisiana
- Parish: Jefferson

Government
  - Mayor: David Camardelle Sr. (D)

Area
  - Total: 8.17 sq mi (21.17 km^{2})
  - Land: 6.41 sq mi (16.59 km^{2})
  - Water: 1.77 sq mi (4.58 km^{2})
- Elevation: 7 ft (2.1 m)

Population (2020)
  - Total: 1,005
  - Rank: JE: 6th
  - Density: 156.9/sq mi (60.59/km^{2})
- Time zone: UTC-6 (CST)
  - Summer (DST): UTC-5 (CDT)
- ZIP Code: 70358
- Area code: 985
- FIPS code: 22-30830
- Website: www.townofgrandisle.com

Grand Isle is a town in Jefferson Parish in the U.S. state of Louisiana, located on a barrier island of the same name in the Gulf of Mexico. The island is at the mouth of Barataria Bay where it meets the Gulf. The town of Grand Isle is statistically part of the New Orleans−Metairie−Kenner metropolitan statistical area, though it is not connected to New Orleans' continuous urbanized area.

The population was 1,005 as of the 2020 U.S. census, down from 1,296 from the previous 2010 U.S. census.

Grand Isle's main street is the seaside start of Louisiana Highway 1 (LA 1), which stretches 436.2 miles (702.0 km) away to the northwest corner of the state, ending near Shreveport. LA 1's automobile causeway at the west end of the island is the only land access to or from Grand Isle. Direct access to Grand Isle's seat of parish government is 95 miles (153 km) away in the more suburban part of Jefferson Parish.

Grand Isle is also the name of a former sulphur mine located 7 miles up the coast of the island, which was completed in 1960 as the first ever offshore Frasch sulphur mine.

== History ==
Grand Isle has been repeatedly pummeled by hurricanes throughout its history. On average, the town and barrier island of Grand Isle has been affected by tropical storms or hurricanes every 2.68 years (since 1877), with direct hits on average every 7.88 years. Some of the more severe are listed here.

In 1860, a 6-foot (2 m) storm surge and great winds resulted in the total devastation of the island. In the 1893 Atlantic hurricane season Grand Isle was devastated by a 16-foot (5 m) storm surge. In the 1909 Atlantic hurricane season the island was hit with a second 16-foot (5 m) storm surge. A category 4 hurricane devastated Grand Isle on September 29 during the 1915 Atlantic hurricane season. Grand Isle was hit by a 3.6-foot (1.1 m) storm surge on August 22 during the 1947 Atlantic hurricane season. In 1956, Hurricane Flossy damaged the island.

Hurricane Betsy in September 1965 and Tropical Storm Frances in 1998 put the entire island under water. On September 26, 2002, Grand Isle was hit by Hurricane Isidore, soon followed by Hurricane Lili passing to the west of the island, causing significant damage. Hurricane Cindy made a direct hit on Grand Isle on July 5, 2005. Even though damage was essentially limited to power outages and beach erosion, the storm's strength still caught residents by surprise.

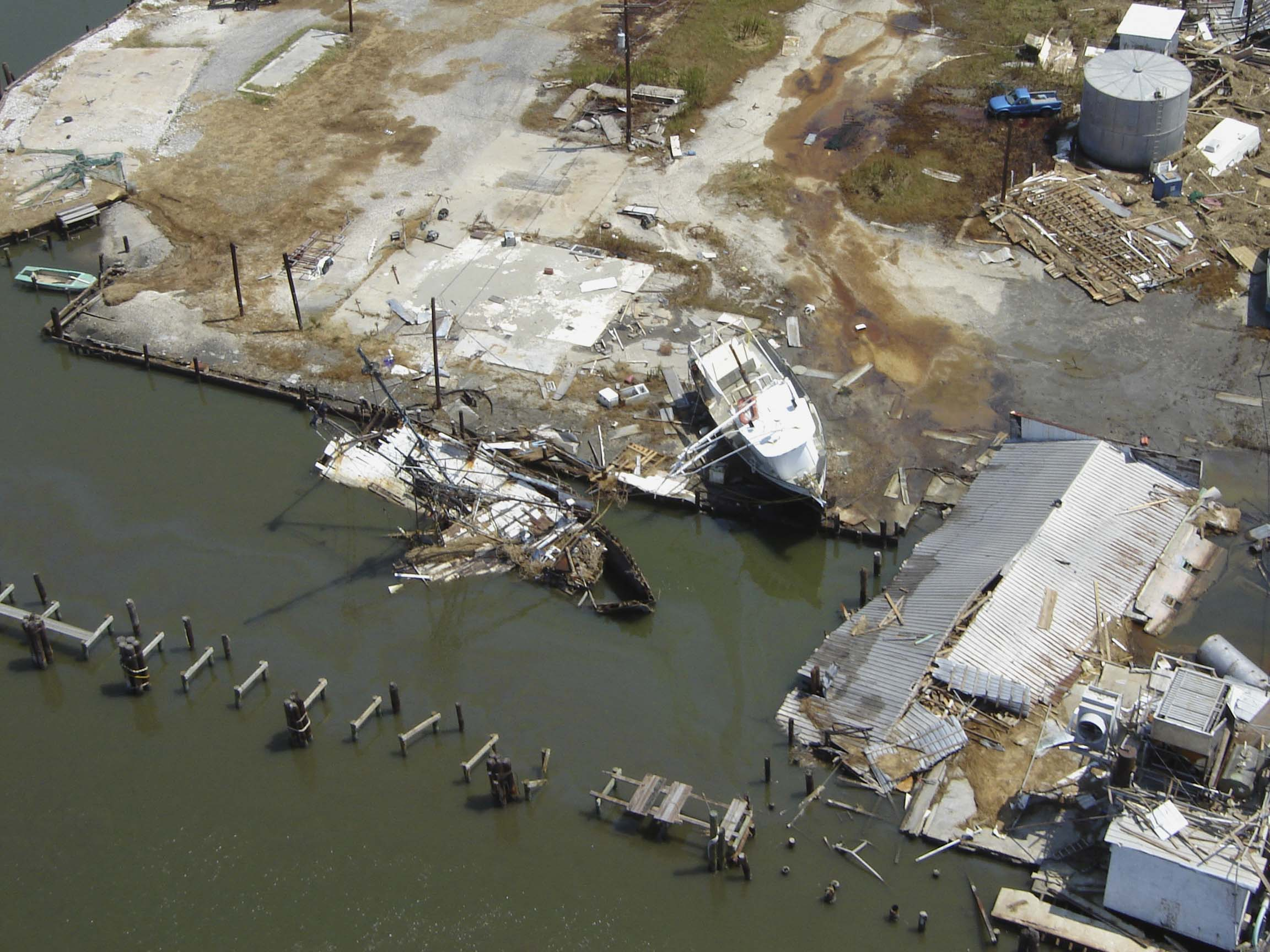
Storm damage from Hurricane Katrina in September 2005

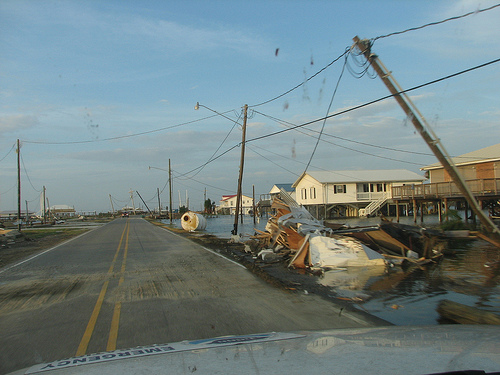
Storm damage from Hurricane Gustav in September 2008

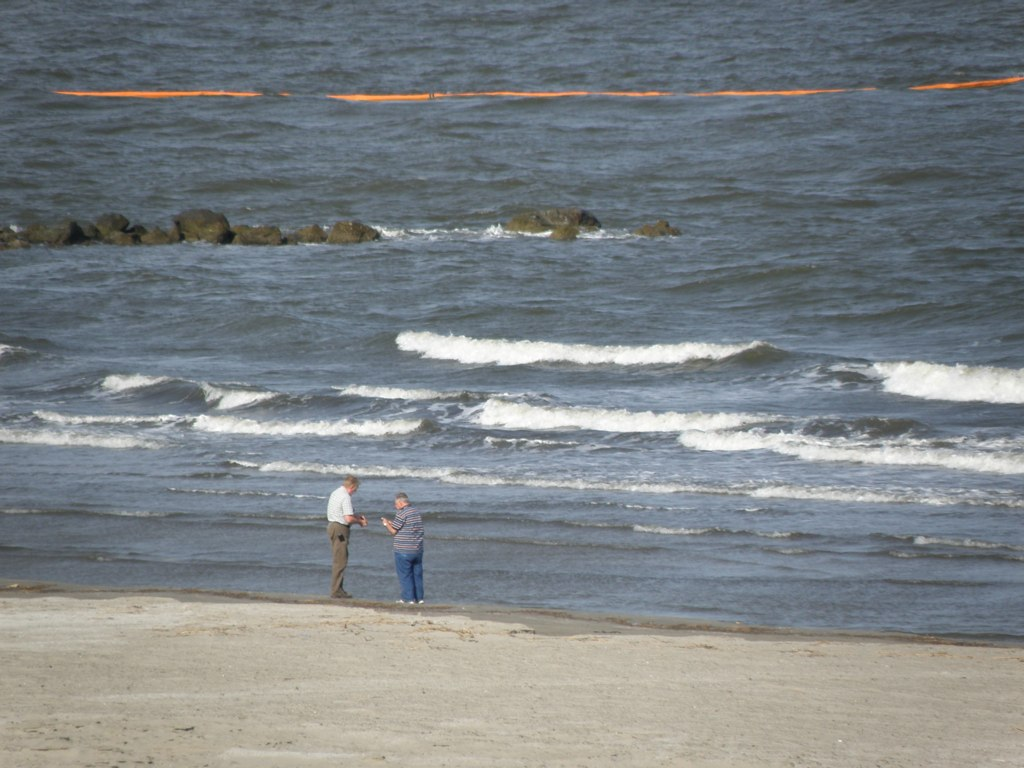
Two men collecting oil samples from the Deepwater Horizon oil spill at a beach in Grand Isle in May 2010

Hurricane Katrina pounded Grand Isle for two days, August 28–29, 2005, destroying or damaging homes and camps along the entire island. Katrina's surge reached 5 ft (1.5 m) at Grand Isle. Large waves severely damaged the only bridge linking Grand Isle to the mainland. A news report published less than two days after the hurricane hit falsely noted, however, that the area had been completely destroyed, reporting a scene similar to that which befell Last Island in 1856. Less than a month later, Grand Isle was further affected by Hurricane Rita. By mid October, a number of businesses were again open on the island.

Hurricane Gustav reached shore west of the island on September 1, 2008, at 9 am CDT, and hit it with a measured wind speed of 105 mph (169 km/h). It was one of the few locations in Louisiana affected while the storm was still classified as a major hurricane. While both storms' eyes passed the island at similar distances, Katrina's eastern passing caused the greatest damage on the bay side. The Gustav surge that washed over the island caused less damage than Katrina, in part due to the most vulnerable structures having already been destroyed by Katrina. Current construction codes prevented the rebuilding of such vulnerable structures. Barataria Pass water levels peaked at 5 ft (1.5 m) above recent high tide. Homes along Louisiana Highway 1 had 2 ft (0.6 m) of water below them. Large sections of levee/dunes were washed onto the highway.

Hurricane Ike passed far south of the island on September 11, 2008, while crews worked to restore power and repair the levee/dune damage caused by Gustav. Some sections of LA 1 west of the island were covered by 1 ft (0.3 m) of water. Wind gusts reached 50 mph (80 km/h) and Barataria Pass water levels reached 3 ft (0.9 m) above recent high tide while Ike was 200 miles (320 km) away.

Hurricane Ida's eastern eye wall hit the area on August 29, 2021, on the 16th anniversary of Hurricane Katrina, causing widespread damage. It was reported that 100 percent of Grand Isle's structures were damaged, and around 40–50 percent of structures were completely destroyed. Nearly all of the town's utility poles had either bent or collapsed from the extreme winds. Entergy decided to fully rebuild and strengthen the island's power grid instead of repairing it like most communities north of Grand Isle had received.

=== Restoration ===
In 1998, the state of Louisiana and its federal and local partners approved a coastal restoration project called Coast 2050: Toward a Sustainable Coast. It is a $14 billion fund that is hoped to be allocated over 50 years in around 77 restoration projects with the aim of creating a sustainable ecosystem of coastal Louisiana. While the plan focuses on all of Louisiana, restoration of the Barataria Basin was the first priority and Grand Isle is at the mouth of Barataria Bay. On February 18, 2000, the United States Army Corps of Engineers and the Louisiana Department of Natural Resources signed an agreement to initiate a restoration plan to this basin. The loss of wetland in Barataria Bay is estimated at 11 square miles per year from 1978 to 1990 (Fuller et al. 1995). Most strategies in the Barataria Basin region depend on the overall input, movement, and circulation of water, sediment, and nutrients in the basin. Other strategies can be implemented independently of these considerations. These include barrier shoreline restoration, marsh creation in the southwestern basin, and a delta-building diversion from the lower Mississippi. The completion of Coast 2050 was to restore and protect 450,000 acres of wetland. U.S. Congress had not approved the Coast 2050 plan, and when Hurricane Katrina and Hurricane Rita hit, the federal government was studying a less costly, scaled down proposal which could be initiated in the span of a decade.

In April 2009, the Mississippi River Sediment Delivery System was proposed to channel dredged sediment from the Mississippi River to the wetlands in South Louisiana to restore 474 acres (192 ha) of tidal marsh. Approximately 200 million tons of sediment flows down the Mississippi River annually, of which the Army Corps of Engineers dredges about 60 million cubic yards of the sediment to maintain Louisiana's waterways. According to the project documents, if successful, the Sediment Delivery system could potentially create 18 square miles (47 km^{2}) of marsh a year and reduce wetland losses by as much as two-thirds. The dredged sediment will be piped to Bayou Dupont via a 1-meter (3 ft 3 in) pipe, to a 500-acre (200 ha) area of open water and broken marsh. Once the area has been adequately filled, it will be planted with marsh grasses. It is estimated that the project will cost $28 million and be completed by August 2009.

The National Oceanic and Atmospheric Administration put up $3 million in the summer of 2009 in federal stimulus grants to restore a protective marsh that will shield the island from backwater flooding. The money will help Grand Isle strengthen its natural defenses, provide better hurricane protection, while also preserving a critical barrier island that buffers inland parishes from the full force of hurricanes. In 2009, the Louisiana Department of Natural Resources used $3 million to dredge sediment from the Mississippi River and create 50 acres (20 ha) of tidal marsh. Not only will the marsh help support recreational and commercial fisheries by providing a healthy habitat, officials said, but it will also buffer the island and reduce storm surge and flooding.

Also in 2009, the Nature Conservancy received a $4 million grant for its Grand Isle shoreline-restoration project, which will create four miles of oyster reefs along the beach in Grand Isle and Biloxi Marsh. (see oyster reef restoration) The frames eventually grow into 2-to-3-foot-high (0.61–0.91 m) oyster reefs that buffer the shore and create productive ocean habitats for fish. Once these reefs have fully restored themselves, they will also help filter the water. The Nature Conservancy hope that these oysters colonize on breakwater structures and that the space on these breakwater structures increase biodiversity.

In response the Deepwater Horizon Oil Spill, the Coalition and the National Wildlife Foundation organized the planting of more than 1,600 mangroves in Grand Isle State Park on June 25, 2011. They hope that this planting will help stabilize the sediment and sand and provide habitat for wildlife, specifically pelicans.

On September 29, 2012, the Coalition to Restore Coastal Louisiana (CRCL) and the Abita Brewing Company partnered together to bring out more than 100 volunteers to help restore and protect the beach dunes at Grand Isle State Park in response to Hurricane Isaac. It was the first project undertaken in Grand Isle since Hurricane Issac made landfall. Volunteers installed dune fences and planted more than 12,000 plugs of dune grass. This will help stabilize the fragile beach along Grand Isle. Abita Beer and CRCL together implemented this and other restoration projects which will directly restore dune habitat and strengthen Grand Isle State Park and other sites in the future.

== Geography ==
According to the United States Census Bureau, the town covered a total area of 7.8 square miles (20 km^{2}), of which 6.1 square miles (16 km^{2}) is land and 1.7 square miles (4.4 km^{2}) (20.88%) is water.

=== Climate ===
Grand Island has a humid subtropical climate with mild winters and long, hot, humid summers.

Climate data for Grand Isle, Louisiana
Month	Jan	Feb	Mar	Apr	May	Jun	Jul	Aug	Sep	Oct	Nov	Dec	Year
Record high °F (°C)	83 (28)	82 (28)	86 (30)	91 (33)	95 (35)	99 (37)	100 (38)	100 (38)	97 (36)	94 (34)	86 (30)	82 (28)	100 (38)
Mean daily maximum °F (°C)	63 (17)	66 (19)	71 (22)	77 (25)	84 (29)	88 (31)	90 (32)	90 (32)	87 (31)	79 (26)	72 (22)	65 (18)	78 (25)
Daily mean °F (°C)	54 (12)	57 (14)	62 (17)	69 (21)	77 (25)	81 (27)	83 (28)	83 (28)	81 (27)	72 (22)	64 (18)	56 (13)	70 (21)
Mean daily minimum °F (°C)	44 (7)	47 (8)	53 (12)	60 (16)	69 (21)	74 (23)	76 (24)	76 (24)	74 (23)	63 (17)	56 (13)	47 (8)	62 (16)
Record low °F (°C)	14 (−10)	12 (−11)	16 (−9)	35 (2)	48 (9)	50 (10)	65 (18)	62 (17)	52 (11)	34 (1)	24 (−4)	10 (−12)	10 (−12)
Average precipitation inches (mm)	5.1 (130)	4.9 (120)	4.7 (120)	2.2 (56)	4.5 (110)	7.2 (180)	8.0 (200)	7.6 (190)	6.2 (160)	4.7 (120)	3.4 (86)	4.7 (120)	63.2 (1,592)
Source: The Weather Channel (Monthly Averages)

=== Coastal protections ===
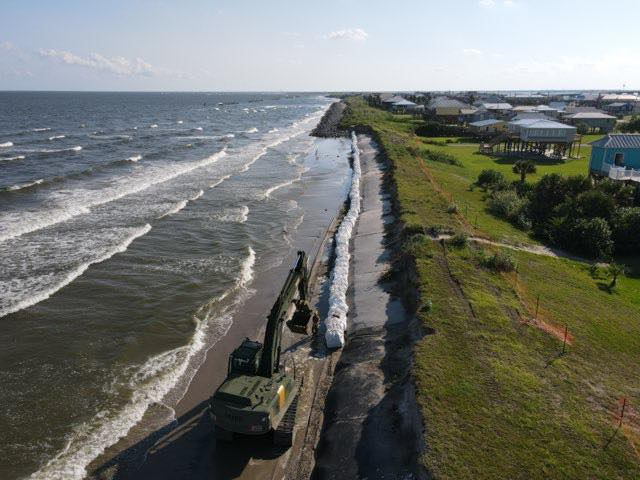
The Louisiana National Guard and local and state agencies reinforce the exposed Burrito Levee in preparation for hurricanes Laura and Marco in 2020.

In 2010, the United States Army Corps of Engineers installed an artificial levee along the island's southern coast that cost $52 million and measures 7.7 miles (12.4 km) long, 13 feet (4.0 m) tall, and 80 feet (24 m) wide. The core of the levee consists of an 8 1/2-by-30-foot (2.6 m × 9.1 m) geotextile tube core that gives the levee its nickname of the "Burrito Levee". The tube is filled with 760,000 cubic yards (580,000 m^{3}) of sand pumped from the gulf floor. In 2017, Jefferson Parish declared a state of emergency over the levee's disrepair and exposed core. The levee has been damaged by multiple storms, including Tropical Storm Cristobal and Hurricane Zeta in 2020 and Hurricane Ida in 2021.

== Demographics ==
Historical population
Census	Pop.	Note	%±
1950	1,100		—
1960	2,074		88.5%
1970	2,236		7.8%
1980	1,982		−11.4%
1990	1,455		−26.6%
2000	1,541		5.9%
2010	1,296		−15.9%
2020	1,005		−22.5%
2025 (est.)	1,012	▲	0.7%
U.S. Decennial Census; 1950 1960 1970 1980; 1990 2000 2010

Grand Isle first appeared as an unincorporated place in the 1950 U.S. census; and as a town in the 1960 U.S. census.

Grand Isle town, Louisiana – Racial and ethnic composition Note: the U.S. Census Bureau treats Hispanic/Latino as an ethnic category. This table excludes Latinos from the racial categories and assigns them to a separate category. Hispanics/Latinos may be of any race.
Race / Ethnicity (NH = Non-Hispanic)	Pop 2000	Pop 2010	Pop 2020	% 2000	% 2010	% 2020
White alone (NH)	1,463	1,178	929	94.94%	90.90%	92.44%
Black or African American alone (NH)	3	10	2	0.19%	0.77%	0.20%
Native American or Alaska Native alone (NH)	35	28	15	2.27%	2.16%	1.49%
Asian alone (NH)	3	2	6	0.19%	0.15%	0.60%
Native Hawaiian or Pacific Islander alone (NH)	0	0	0	0.00%	0.00%	0.00%
Other race alone (NH)	1	2	4	0.06%	0.15%	0.40%
Mixed race or Multiracial (NH)	13	25	19	0.84%	1.93%	1.89%
Hispanic or Latino (any race)	23	51	30	1.49%	3.94%	2.99%
Total	1,541	1,296	1,005	100.00%	100.00%	100.00%

At the 2000 U.S. census, 1,541 people, 622 households, and 436 families lived in the town.

The population density was 251.1 inhabitants per square mile (97.0/km^{2}). There were 1,875 housing units at an average density of 305.6 per square mile (118.0/km^{2}). In 2000, there were 622 households, out of which 29.6% had children under the age of 18 living with them, 54.2% were married couples living together, 8.4% had a female householder with no husband present, and 29.9% were non-families. The U.S. Census Bureau tabulated that 24.0% of all households were made up of individuals, and 9.3% had someone living alone who was 65 years of age or older. The average household size was 2.46 and the average family size was 2.89.

The median income for a household in the town was $33,548, and the median income for a family was $35,517. Males had a median income of $34,000 versus $19,333 for females. The per capita income for the town was $18,330. About 9.1% of families and 13.2% of the population were below the poverty line, including 14.3% of those under age 18 and 12.9% of those age 65 or over.

At the 2019 American Community Survey, there were 2,038 housing units and 214 were owner-occupied; there were 184 families in the town. The average household size was 2.06 for owner-occupied housing units, and the median value of owner-occupied housing units was $203,600. Residents of Grand Isle had a median household income of $43,333 in 2019, and an estimated 22.3% of the population lived at or below the poverty line. A year later by the 2020 United States census, there were 1,005 people, 330 households, and 184 families residing in the town.

In 2000, the racial makeup of the town was 96.04% White, 2.27% Native American, 0.19% African American, 0.19% Asian, 0.39% from other races, and 0.91% from two or more races. Hispanics or Latin Americans of any race were 1.49% of the population. In 2019, 94.9% of Grand Isle's population were non-Hispanic white, 0.8% Black or African American, 2.0% multiracial, and 2.3% Hispanic or Latin American of any race. By 2020, the composition was 92.44% non-Hispanic white, 0.2% Black or African American, 1.49% Native American, 0.6% Asian, 2.29% multiracial or some other race, and 2.99% Hispanic or Latino American.

== Government ==
The United States Postal Service operates a post office in Grand Isle.

== Arts and culture ==
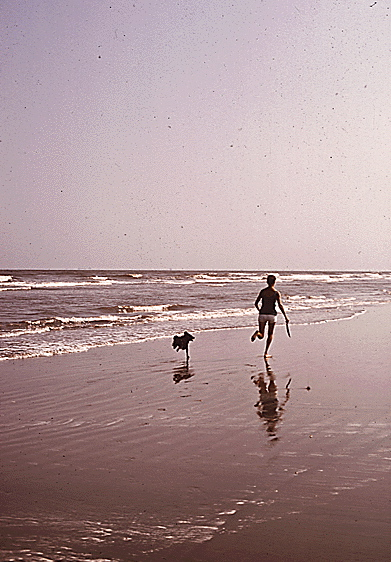
Enjoying the Grand Isle beach, 1972

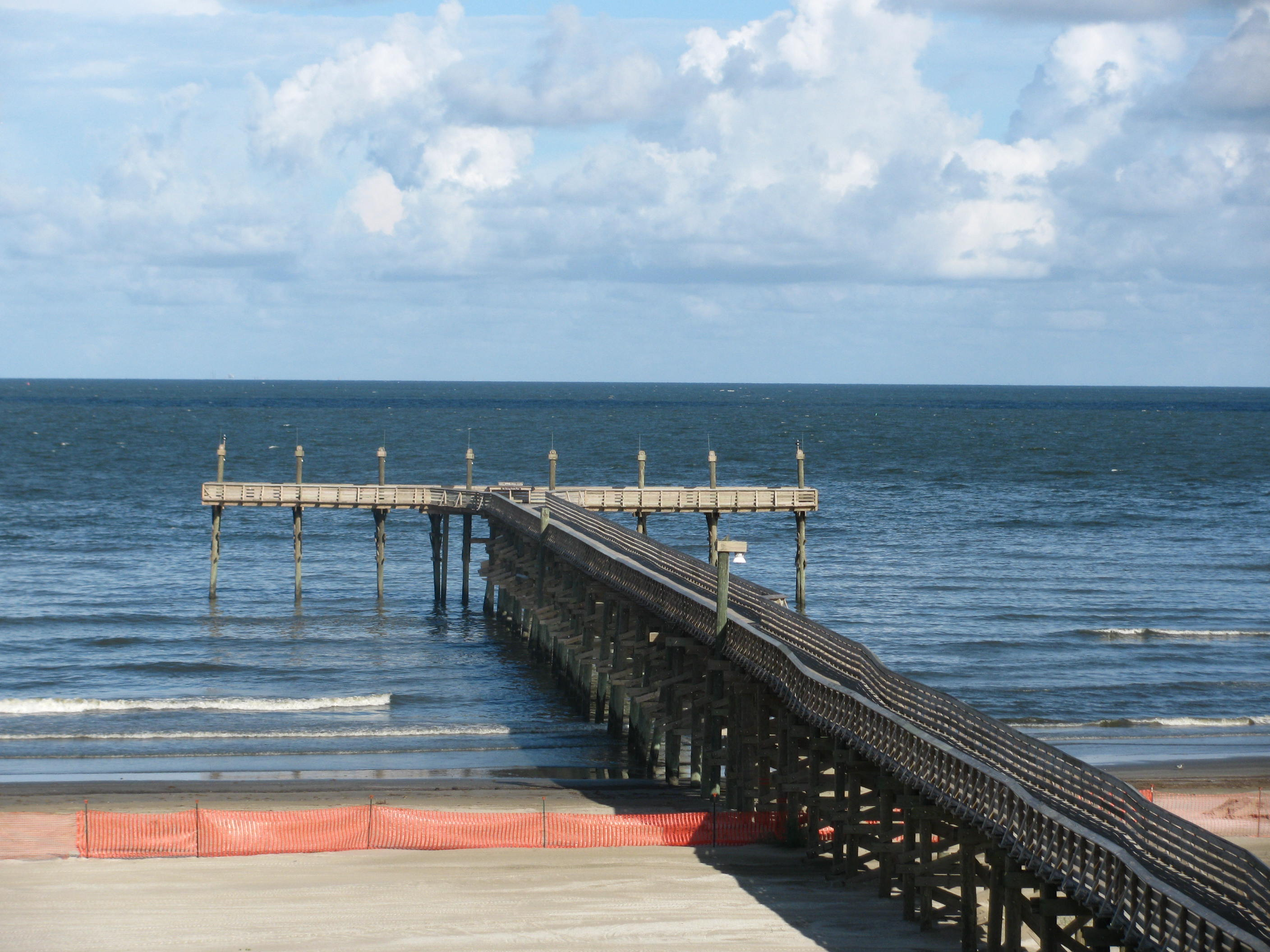
Boardwalk on the beach at Grand Isle State Park

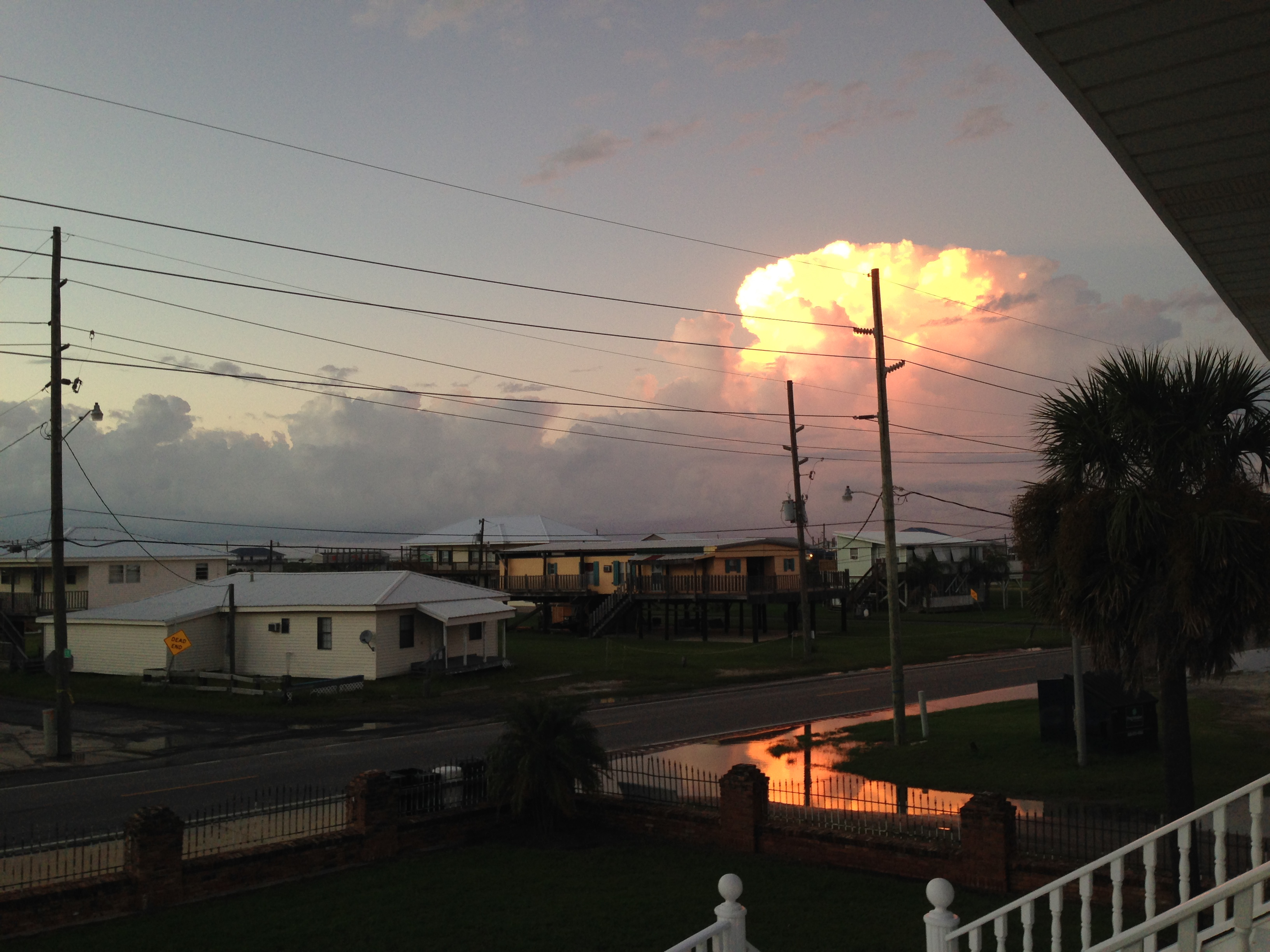
Houses in Grand Isle

Fishing is an important part of Grand Isle's culture, with more than 280 species of fish in the surrounding waters. In 1928, the annual Grand Isle Tarpon Rodeo, fishing tournament, was established on the island and is now one of the premier salt water fishing rodeos in the United States. The Cajun rodeo draws over 15,000 people annually.

The island also has well maintained beaches. Grand Isle State Park, on the east end of the island, is the only state-owned and operated beach on the Louisiana Gulf Coast. The beach is a popular destination for people living in South Louisiana, and is also one of the only locations in Louisiana where people surf. A local surf club also exists, established in 2017, and rents out surf boards and gives surf lessons.

The island is home to the Coast Guard Station Grand Isle located on the eastern end of the island.

=== Grand Isle Migratory Bird Festival ===
The Grand Isle Migratory Bird Festival, held annually in April, was first established in 1997 by several nature organizations dedicated to the preservation and restoration of the Grand Isle's chenier habitat. The idea for the project of preserving and establishing the chenier habitat in order for tourists and bird watchers to see the migratory birds was first established by the Grand Isle Community Development Team. The project was then picked up a year later by the Barataria-Terrebonne Nation Estuary Program to help in the development and preservation of the habitat as well as the advertisement of the Grand Isle Migratory Bird Festival.

Originally, the festival was held on a single day, but due to increased popularity and funding, the festival has grown into a three-day event. Sponsors of the Grand Isle Migratory Bird Festival believe that future efforts will be more successful if more people are educated about not only the identification of the birds that migrate through the island, but also the identification and importance of the plants the birds utilize. Each day during the festival, multiple tours are given throughout the diverse habitats of Grand Isle where experienced guides instruct beginner birders on the different techniques used to find and identify birds as well as the ecological aspects of the island. Other tours are offered that guide visitors through the chenier forests and teach them about the native plants found on the island, including the species that are not only edible to birds but to people as well. Other features of the festival include bird banding and mist netting demonstrations, seminars on what to look for when choosing a pair of binoculars or a spotting scope, as well as games and other activities.

Described as a barrier island, Grand Isle consists of mainly marsh habitat, beaches and chenier forests which attract numerous species of migratory birds. The presence of these hardwood forests allows for the seasonal arrival and departure of major flocks of birds that migrate across the Gulf of Mexico to South America during both the fall and spring migrations. The Migratory Bird Festival is held annually and coincides with the arrival of the spring migrants returning from their winter habitat in the south.

=== Chenier habitat ===
Chenier habitats are not limited to Grand Isle, but were historically found in wetlands throughout the southeastern coasts of Louisiana called the Chenier Plain. Today, the Chenier Plain consists of uplands, wetlands, and open water that extends from Vermilion Bay, Louisiana to East Bay, Texas. Of the original 500,000 acres (200,000 ha) that had existed, an estimated 5,000 to 10,000 square acres remain. Chenier forests consist of hardwood trees, primarily oaks and hackberries, as well as a variety of other vegetation such as mulberry, honeylocust, water oak, green ash, and American elm, all which grow along slightly elevated ridges. These ridges are the result of the build-up of sediment from periodic shifts of the Mississippi River's delta and can range in size from 1–3 metres (3.3–9.8 ft) high and between 30–450 metres (98–1,476 ft) wide. Because of the slightly higher elevation, chenier forests not only allow for the growth of hardwood trees that support the variety of migratory birds that pass through Grand Isle, but also act as a barrier for salt water intrusion into a marsh during storm surges. Typically, marshes that are north of a chenier are less saline than marshes that are closer to the gulf.

The cover of a chenier forest provides for migratory birds a place to rest before or after making the flight across the Gulf of Mexico and in some species of birds, the habitat is essential for breeding. However, some studies suggest that it is not just the cover that habitats like chenier forests provide that attract migratory birds, but it is the food availability that is the principal factor in migratory bird stopover. Stopover is a term used for when flocks of migratory birds pause in a certain area to rest and/or feed. Studies have shown that significant stopover occurs more frequently as flocks of migratory birds near the coast. There is a correlation between large densities of birds occurring in continuous hardwood forests, such as old-growth cheniers. Studies done on forest cover indicate that as the amount of cover increased, arthropod abundance and the presence of fleshy, fruit bearing vegetation increased as well, and that migratory birds use forest cover as an indicator of greater habitat quality, thus a better food source per impending journey across the Gulf of Mexico.

=== Grand Isle Birding Trail ===
The birding trails along Grand Isle consists of nearly sixty acres of marsh and chenier habitat and are divided up into six tracts that are managed by the Louisiana Nature Conservancy and the Grand Isle Community Development Team. The trails mainly consist of tracts procured by the Grand Isle Nature Conservancy or donated by local landowners. However, because some of the boundaries of the tracts are partially fragmented, the chenier habitat can sometimes expand into private property. But due to the increased popularity of the Migratory Bird Festival, private landowners will generally allow bird watchers and ornithologists permission onto their land. Some residents will go as far as to post signs that say "Bird Friendly" as a way to invite bird watchers onto their property.

The Grilleta Tract was established by a donation of ten acres by the Xavier Grilleta of B&G Services in 1998. In 2001, an additional three acres were acquired that were adjacent to the original property. Although slightly smaller than the Port Commission Marsh, the Grilleta Tract is mostly chenier habitat and is considered the center of the Grand Isle Birding Trail. This stand of forest is one of only two undisturbed chenier forests that still exist on the island. In addition to live oaks, in which a few are over 125 years old, the area supports a variety of trees and shrubs, including red mulberry, black willow, and red bay.

The Grand Isle Port Commission Tract is roughly 22 acres and is located on the western part of the island at the corner of Ludwig Lane. Two hundred eighty feet of boardwalk allow access to the salt marsh tidal ponds that dominate the area. In this tract, birders can spot a variety of passerines, raptors, colonial birds roosting in the sparse chenier habitat, and wading birds. The second largest stretch of forest is a combination of the Maples tract and the Landry-Leblanc tract. It is locally called the Sureway Woods, as it is near the Sureway Supermarket. Together, the Maples tract and the Landry-LeBlanc tract comprise twenty acres of chenier forest.

The remaining two tracts on the island consist of the Cemetery Woods, which is property of Louisiana State University, and the Govan Tract. The Cemetery Woods is roughly four and a half acres and, like the Grilleta Tract, it contains old growth trees that are over 125 years old. In addition to the hardwood forest, the property contains salt flats and marshland, which promote the habitation of ducks, moorhens, grebes, and other wading birds. The Govan Tract was donated to the Nature Conservancy in 2003 by the Govan family, who had owned it since the late 1800s. The tract only consists of half an acre, but within it, the mass availability of lives oaks, hackberries, dewberry, and poison oak attracts birds such as painted buntings, red-winged blackbirds, warblers, and other passerines that can be seen during the migratory season.

In addition to the Grand Isle Birding Trail, bird watchers can also see marine birds such as gulls, terns, pelicans, and other shorebirds from the Grand Isle State Park at the northeast end of the island.

== Education ==
Grand Isle is served by Jefferson Parish Public Schools. The Grand Isle School serves pre-kindergarten through 12th grade.

Grand Isle Library is a small public library responding to the needs of local residents and visitors. The new Grand Isle Library opened on Wednesday, November 14, 2012.

Jefferson Parish is in the area of Delgado Community College.

== In popular culture ==
- Grand Isle was the setting for the novel The Awakening (1899) by Kate Chopin. Chopin spent her summers in Grand Isle for over a decade.
- The second episode of Route 66 was filmed on Grand Isle in 1960. The plot involved the local shrimp-fishing community imperiled by an approaching hurricane.

== See also ==
- 1909 Grand Isle hurricane
- Grand Isle Seaplane Base
- Grand Isle State Park
- Louisiana Highway 1 Bridge
