= Fisher Middle-High School =

Location
- 2529 Jean Lafitte Blvd; Lafitte, LA 70067-9801; United States; 29.7382°N 90.1275°W

Information
- School district: Jefferson Parish Public Schools
- Principal: Dawn Matherne
- Staff: 28.70 (FTE)
- Grades: 6–12
- Enrollment: 494 (2023–2024)
- Student to teacher ratio: 17.21
- Colors: Purple and gold
- Athletics conference: LHSAA 9-2A
- Mascot: Gators
- Website: www.jpschools.org/fisher

Fisher Middle-High School is a secondary school in Jean Lafitte, an unincorporated area in Jefferson Parish, Louisiana. It is a part of Jefferson Parish Public Schools.

== Athletics ==
Fisher High athletics competes in the LHSAA.
