= Jefferson Parish Public Schools =

School district in Louisiana, United States

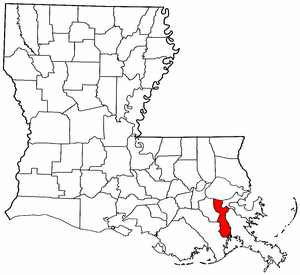
The location of Jefferson Parish, Louisiana

Jefferson Parish Public Schools is a school district based in Harvey in unincorporated Jefferson Parish, Louisiana, United States. The district operates all district public schools in Jefferson Parish and covers the entire parish. As of 2019 it had 50,582 students, making it the largest public school system in the state.

== History ==
In 1981 it had about 61,000 students and 75 schools. By 2012 it had 81 schools but about 46,000. That year there was a proposal to close seven schools. Of the nine the Jefferson Parish School Board members, eight voted in favor of the closures and one voted against. The projected number of students to be moved was about 2,000.

== Demographics ==
In the 2014–2015 school year the district had 48,126 students, 1,467 students (3%) higher than the enrollment of the previous school year. There were a total of 5,634 English Language Learners (ELL) students as part of the overall student enrollment for 2014–2015, and that had increased by about 1,200 (28%). Most of the additional students for 2014–2015 were Hispanic, and of them, most were Honduran. According to ELL director Karina Castillo the East Bank had more of the new students than the West Bank.

== Academic performance ==
James K. Glassman of The Atlantic wrote in 1978 that the school system was of the same quality as that of New Orleans even though Jefferson Parish was wealthier than New Orleans; Glassman described Jefferson Parish as "one of the most poorly run rich counties in the United States."

In October 2009, the release of annual school performance scores by the Louisiana Department of Education revealed that Jefferson Parish's public school system posted its largest-ever increase in performance score, to 78.4, though the performance score remained significantly below the state average of 91. In 2011, according to state accountability rules, the district made a "D" grade. This increased to a "C" in 2012, and then a "B" on 2013, giving it the 36th highest score of the school districts in the state. This score applies to the 2012–2013 school year. Its Louisiana performance score was 85.9 of 150. In 2014 it continued having a "B" ranking, with its performance being 87.2 of 150.

By 2012 the district established a policy stating that if a principal does not reach academic goals in three years, the principal will be removed. In 2012 15 principals lost their jobs over this policy.

== Operations ==
As of 2014 teachers who have large numbers of bilingual students and are fluent in either Spanish, Arabic, and Vietnamese may receive a $3,000 annual stipend and/or a $2,000 signing bonus.

Previously the district had an administrative building in Marrero for people living in the West Bank of the parish. It was proposed for closure and consolidation into the Harvey headquarters in 2012.

The teachers previously had a collective bargaining agreement but it expired in 2012. The school board did not wish to renew it. The Teacher Voice Advisory Council was created in 2013.

Previously the school district headquarters were in Gretna.

== Schools ==
=== K-12 schools ===
- Grand Isle School (Grand Isle)

=== 6-12 schools ===
- Haynes Academy for Advanced Studies -Metairie, LA

=== Secondary schools ===
7-12 schools

- Fisher Middle-High School - Jean Lafitte

6-12 schools

(unzoned)

- Patrick F. Taylor Science and Technology Academy (Unincorporated, Jefferson)

==== High schools ====
East Bank

- Alfred Bonnabel High School - Kenner
- East Jefferson High School - (Unincorporated, Metairie)
- Riverdale High School - (Unincorporated, Jefferson)

West Bank

- John Ehret High School - (Unincorporated, near Marrero)
- L. W. Higgins High School - (Unincorporated, Marrero)
- West Jefferson High School - (Unincorporated, Harvey)

Alternative high schools, West Bank

- Jefferson High School (Gretna)
- Strehle Community School (Avondale, Louisiana)

Vocational/Technical Public Schools, West Bank

- Cuillier, Joseph A. Sr. Career Center (Marero, Louisiana)

==== Middle schools ====
East Bank

- John Q. Adams Middle School - (Unincorporated, Metairie)
- T. H. Harris Middle School - (Unincorporated, Metairie)
- J.D. Meisler Middle School - (Unincorporated, Metairie)

West Bank

- Livaudais Middle School - (Unincorporated, Gretna address)
- Marrero Middle School - (Unincorporated, Marrero)
- Ruppel Academy for Advanced Studies - (Unincorporated, Gretna)
- Stella Worley Middle School - Westwego
- Jefferson RISE (Charter)- Gretna

=== K-8 schools ===
K-8 schools:

East Bank:

- A. C. Alexander School (formerly an elementary school) - Kenner
- John James Audubon School (formerly an elementary school) - Kenner
- Tom Benson School (formerly Theodore Roosevelt Middle School until 2019) - Kenner
- Bissonet Plaza School (formerly an elementary school) - (Unincorporated, Metairie)
- Chateau Estates School (formerly an elementary school) - Kenner
- J.C. Ellis School (formerly an elementary school) - (Unincorporated, Metairie) - In 2014 it was ranked "A" under state accountability rules.
- Harahan School (formerly an elementary school) - Harahan
- Hazel Park Hilda Knoff School (formerly an elementary school) - (Unincorporated, River Ridge)
- Jefferson School (Jefferson) - Jefferson Elementary and Riverdale Middle were merged into a single school in 2020.
- Joseph C. Moscona School (Formerly an Elementary & Ella Donhonde School)
- Granville T. Woods School (formerly an elementary school) - Kenner
- Kenner Discovery Health Science Academy/KDHSA (Charter)- Kenner - By 2014 the school made attempts to recruit prospective students who were categorized as "at risk" (higher chance of failure) and black students. That year 58% of its students were deemed "at-risk". In 2014 the Jefferson Parish School Board approved allowing the school to expand. Its enrollment for 2015 was allowed to increase by 90 and that year it was allowed to include the 8th grade; the 7th grade was previously the highest. (Charter School)

West Bank:

- Cherbonnier/Rillieux School (Unincorporated, Waggaman)
- Douglass Community School (Gretna)
- Allen Ellender School (formerly a middle school) - (Unincorporated, Marrero)
- Estelle School, formerly Estelle Elementary School - (Unincorporated, Marrero) - In 2012 it had 1,125 students, making it above capacity and the parish's largest elementary school. That year the district made rezoning plans.
- Emmett Gilbert School of Excellence at Ford a.k.a. Emmett Gilbert K-8 (formerly Henry Ford Middle School) - (Unincorporated, Avondale) - Renamed in 2019
- Congetta Trippe Janet School (formerly an elementary school) - (Unincorporated, Marrero)
- Lincoln School (formerly an elementary school) - (Unincorporated, Marrero)
- Harry S. Truman School (formerly a middle school) - (Unincorporated Jefferson Parish, Marrero)
- Woodland West School (formerly an elementary school) - (Unincorporated, Harvey)
- Woodmere School (formerly an elementary school) - (Unincorporated, Harvey)

=== Elementary schools ===
East Bank

Zoned

- Airline Park Academy for Advanced Studies - (Unincorporated, Metairie)
- Alice Birney Elementary School - (Unincorporated, Metairie)
- Bridgedale Elementary School - (Unincorporated, Metairie)
- John Clancy/Joseph Maggiore Elementary School - Kenner
- Greenlawn Terrace Elementary School - Kenner
- Green Park Elementary School - (Unincorporated, Metairie)
- Phoebe Hearst Elementary School - (Unincorporated, Metairie) - In 2014 it was ranked "A" under state accountability rules.
- Harold Keller Elementary School - (Unincorporated, Metairie) - In 2014 it was ranked "A" under state accountability rules.
- Rudolph Matas Elementary School - (Unincorporated, Metairie)
- Marie B. Riviere Elementary School - (Unincorporated, Metairie) - Bucktown - In 2014 it was ranked "A" under state accountability rules.
- Walter G. Schneckenburger Elementary School - Kenner - In 2014 it was ranked "A" under state accountability rules.

Unzoned

- Metairie Academy for Advanced Studies - (Unincorporated, Metairie)

West Bank

Zoned

- Judge Lionel R. Collins Elementary School - (Unincorporated, Marrero)
- Geraldine Boudreaux Elementary School - (Unincorporated Jefferson Parish, Terrytown)
- William Hart Elementary School - Gretna
- Shirley T. Johnson Gretna Park Elementary School - Gretna
- Isaac Joseph Elementary School (Westwego)
  - In 2020, Myrtle C. Thibodeaux and Vic A. Pitre Elementary Schools were consolidated into Joseph Elementary, on the site of Pitre, and named after the first African-American superintendent of the school district.
- Leo E. Kerner Elementary School (formerly Jean Lafitte Elementary School) - Jean Lafitte - In 2011 it was ranked "D" under state accountability rules, and in 2014 it was ranked "A" under the same rules.
- McDonogh #26 Elementary School - Gretna
- Ella C. Pittman Elementary School - (Unincorporated, Harvey)
- Paul J. Solis Elementary School - (Unincorporated, Timberlane)
- Catherine Strehle Elementary School - (Unincorporated, Avondale)
- Terrytown Elementary School - (Unincorporated, Terrytown)
- Westwego Elementary School - Westwego

Unzoned

- Gretna No. 2 Academy for Advanced Studies - Gretna
- Marrero Academy for Advanced Studies - Marrero

=== Kindergartens ===
- Harvey Kindergarten School (Unincorporated, Harvey)

== Former schools ==
2023 closures

- Helen Cox High School - (Unincorporated, Harvey)
- Grace King High School - (Unincorporated, Metairie)
- Gretna Middle School - Gretna
- Joshua Butler Elementary School - (Unincorporated, Bridge City)
- Mildred S. Harris Elementary School - (Unincorporated, Bridge City) - The school was given its last name, after the founding principal of the school, in 2012. Members of the family of the founding principal and former student Nedra Cassard had campaigned to have the school renamed, and the district voted in favor of renaming. The school was founded in 1952. It closed in 2023. There was an unsuccessful community campaign to try to salvage the school.
- Washington Elementary School - Kenner

2020 closures

- Myrtle C. Thibodeaux and Vic A. Pitre Elementary Schools were consolidated into Joseph Elementary.
- Fred Douglass Elementary School - Gretna - Students moved to Johnson Gretna Park and McDonough 26.
- Jefferson Elementary School (Unincorporated, Jefferson) - Students moved to Riverdale K-8, formerly a middle school.
- Miller Wall Elementary School

2012 closures

They were:

- Ralph J. Bunche Accelerated Academy for High School Preparation - (Unincorporated, Metairie) - The closure plan called for the students to be moved to Bonnabel High.
- Homedale Elementary School - (Unincorporated, Harvey) - The closure plan called for students to be moved to McDonogh No. 26 Elementary.
- Joseph S. Maggiore, Sr. Elementary School - (Unincorporated, Metairie) - Area parents advocated for keeping Maggiore open. The closure plan called for students to be moved to Clancy, Green Park, and Woods.
- Kate Middleton Elementary School - Gretna - The closure plan called for some students to be moved to Hart Elementary and others to be moved to Terrytown Elementary. In the 2011–2012 school year, Middleton had 370 students. Some parents criticized the closure plans as the school district stated that 350 was the minimum enrollment for an optimally-run elementary school, but the district still chose to close Middleton. The school's performance under Louisiana accountability laws declined after 2008, with the 2010–2011 score being a "D−".
- Norbert Rillieux Elementary School - (Unincorporated, Waggaman) - The closure plan called for the students to be moved to Cherbonnier Elementary. In 2011 the school had 208 students.
- Bonella A. St. Ville Accelerated Academy - (Unincorporated, Harvey) - Initially Elm Grove Elementary School, it served as a neighborhood elementary campus, and in the pre-1970s racially segregated period it was for black children. It was renamed after formal principal Bonella A. St. Ville. It was later converted into an alternative middle school for students who were academically behind their peers. It had 144 students in 2012. The closure plan called for the program to be moved to Ehret High. There were area residents arguing that it instead should go back to being a neighborhood elementary school.
- Waggaman School - The closure plan called for the program to be moved to West Bank Community School.
