= Louisiana's 85th House of Representatives district =

American legislative district

Louisiana's 85th State House of Representatives district
Representative
Vincent Cox III; R–Gretna

Louisiana's 85th House of Representatives district is one of 105 Louisiana House of Representatives districts. It is currently represented by Republican Vincent Cox III.

== Geography ==
HD85 is located entirely within Jefferson Parish, with its north border going along the west bank of the Mississippi River. It includes nearly all of the City of Gretna, and portions of the census-designated places of Timerblane, Harvey, and Terrytown.

== Election results ==
Year	Winning candidate	Party	Percent	Opponent	Party	Percent	Opponent	Party	Percent
2011	Bryan Adams	Republican	57.2%	Stephen Leonard	Republican	42.8%			
2015	Bryan Adams	Republican	100%						
2016*	Joseph Marino	Independent	100%						
2019	Joseph Marino	Independent	100%						
2023	Vincent Cox III	Republican	62%	Andrea Manuel	Democratic	31.8%	Andrew Bennett	Independent	6.2%

"*" indicates special election
