= Woodmere =

Woodmere may refer to some place names in the United States:

- Woodmere, Baltimore, Maryland, a neighborhood
- Woodmere, Montgomery, Alabama, a neighborhood
- Woodmere, Louisiana
- Woodmere, New York
  - Woodmere (LIRR station)
- Woodmere, Ohio
- Woodmere Art Museum, Philadelphia, Pennsylvania
- Woodmere Cemetery, Detroit, Michigan
