= Helen Cox =

Helen Cox may refer to:

- Helen Cox High School, Harvey, Louisiana, USA
- Helen Cox (politician) (1974–2016), British politician better known as Jo Cox
