= Revius =

Revius is a surname. Notable people with the surname include:

- Jacobus Revius (1586–1658), Dutch poet, Calvinist theologian, and church historian
- Louis François Revius (1832–1902), Dutch cellist and composer

== See also ==
- Revius Ortique Jr. (1924–2008), American jurist and civil rights activist
