= John McDonogh =

American businessman (1779–1850)

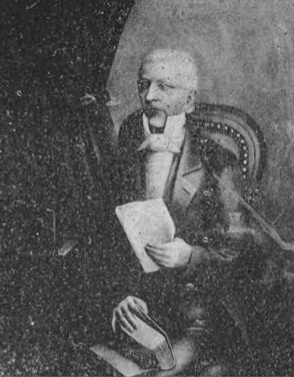
- Born: December 29, 1779; Baltimore, Maryland, U.S.
- Died: October 26, 1850 (aged 70)
- Resting place: McDonogh School; Owings Mills, Maryland, U.S.
- Occupations: Trader, real estate speculator

John McDonogh (December 29, 1779 – October 26, 1850) was an American entrepreneur whose adult life was spent in south Louisiana and later in Baltimore. He made a fortune in real estate and shipping, and as a slave owner, he supported the American Colonization Society, which organized transportation for freed people of color to Liberia. He had devised a manumission scheme whereby the people he held as enslaved could "buy" their own freedom, which took them some 15 years. In his will he provided large grants for the public education of children of poor whites and freed people of color in New Orleans and Baltimore, and by the 1970s some 20 schools in the New Orleans public school system were named for him.

== Life and career ==
McDonogh was born in Baltimore and entered the shipping business there. In 1800, his employers sent him as supercargo on a ship to Liverpool, England, to procure a cargo of goods for the Louisiana trade. He was successful, and after a second such voyage decided to make his home in New Orleans. Establishing a store and engaging in the "commission and shipping business", he prospered there.

By 1807, McDonogh turned his focus away from his mercantile operations to focus on real estate, acquiring large tracts of land in Spanish West Florida. He reportedly expanded his holdings by renting properties in respectable neighborhoods to brothel owners. When neighbors to these properties sought to move, McDonogh would purchase their properties and then evict the brothels.

In 1818, he was a candidate for the U.S. Senate. After he lost that election, he left New Orleans and settled across the Mississippi River, establishing the town of McDonoghville, now called McDonogh, which is in present-day Algiers and Gretna. The site of his McDonoghville home has long since eroded by the flooding of the Mississippi River.

The young McDonogh was mentioned as having unsuccessfully courted Micaela Almonester, who went on to become the Baroness Pontalba, one of the most important figures in New Orleans history; however, there are no documented sources of this rumor. He was also rebuffed in courtship later in life. A failure to marry and the loss of the Senate race may have contributed to a life which has been described as reclusive. He was a prominent citizen but not well-loved; one obituary proclaimed his benevolence, "notwithstanding the general opinion to the contrary," while another noted that "his manners were rigid, severe and repelling," and a third observed that he left "no friends to grieve at his death." William H. Seymour, a local and near-contemporary chronicler, described him in 1896 as having been an "eccentric philanthropist" who "for twenty-two long years toiled" within the walls of his "somber dwelling".

McDonogh was a workaholic and worked long hours almost until the time of his death, administering his vast land holdings, which were believed to be the largest (but not the most valuable) of any private individual in the country in 1850 when he died. His land holdings entirely surrounded the rapidly growing city of New Orleans and elsewhere in southeast Louisiana.

== Slaveholding and manumission ==
McDonogh was a slaveholder. In 1822, he devised a manumission scheme by which his slaves could buy their freedom. The process took about 15 years; thus he was able to profit from their labor before he set them free. McDonogh was also active in, and contributed to, the American Colonization Society, which enabled freed black slaves to emigrate back to Africa. McDonogh used the Society to provide passage to Liberia for many of the people he had once enslaved.

=== David and Washington McDonogh ===
McDonogh identified two of his slaves, David K. McDonogh and Washington Watts McDonogh, as "youths of great promise" for manumission to Liberia. In preparation for manumission, McDonogh taught David and Washington to read and write, in violation of Louisiana laws. Wishing to prepare the pair further to become missionaries, John McDonogh arranged for them to begin studies at Lafayette College in Easton, Pennsylvania starting in May 1838.

Washington struggled academically; he left the college in June 1842, and went on to spend the rest of his life in Liberia, eventually becoming elected to the lower house of the national legislature. David did well at Lafayette, studying medicine, anatomy, and even apprenticing to a local doctor/pharmacist, and graduated in September 1844. David refused to be deported to Liberia, however, and eventually settled in New York City where he was active in politics and medicine. David eventually received a medical degree in 1875. He died in Newark, New Jersey in 1893. The first hospital in New York City with interracial physicians and patients was named McDonough Memorial in David's memory, in 1898. The hospital closed in 1904.

== Legacy ==
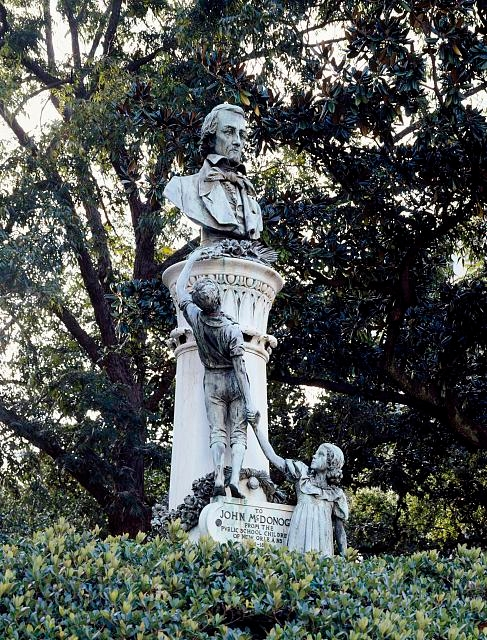
John McDonogh statue, Lafayette Square, New Orleans

Although during his life McDonogh was an infamous miser, he left the bulk of his fortune—close to $2 million—to the cities of Baltimore and New Orleans for the purpose of building public schools for poor children—specifically, white and freed black children. This was unprecedented, and proved controversial. His heirs contested the will, and the case, McDonogh's Executors v. Murdoch, went to the U.S. Supreme Court. This delayed execution of the will until 1858, with New Orleans receiving a settlement of $704,440 (~$19.8 million in 2024).

Baltimore already had a substantial public school system, but McDonogh's will also stipulated the creation of a "school farm" for underprivileged boys outside of the city. McDonogh School in Owings Mills, Maryland, founded in 1873, was the result.

The New Orleans public school system had been established in 1841, but the McDonogh Fund facilitated major expansion. Eventually over 30 schools were built, most emblazoned with his name and a number. By the early 1970s there were 20 McDonogh schools remaining in New Orleans. In the 1980s and 1990s, many of those were renamed in a movement to remove the names of slaveholders from New Orleans' public schools. The following John McDonogh schools are still in operation, post-Katrina: John McDonogh High School and McDonogh #7, #15, #26, #28, #32, #35, and #42.

McDonogh's will proved difficult to administer because of the large number of properties involved, many of which were rented. Also, McDonogh had stipulated the properties to be a perpetual trust and that no properties could ever be sold. The trustees eventually got a court ruling allowing them to sell off the property. Money from the trust funded schools for about 100 years, although because of population growth the estate was not sufficient to cover the entire school systems expenses.

== Gravesite and annual commemorations ==
After McDonogh died in 1850, he was buried alongside his slaves in the McDonogh Cemetery (now known as the McDonoghville Cemetery) on his plantation in present-day Gretna, Louisiana. In July 1861, his remains were exhumed and re-buried in Green Mount Cemetery in Baltimore.

In 1945, McDonogh's remains were again exhumed and re-buried, this time on the campus of McDonogh School in Owings Mills, Maryland. McDonogh rests there to this day, under a monument on which his rules for living are inscribed. The same monument that marked McDonogh's grave at Green Mount Cemetery; it was transported to the McDonogh School campus in 1945 as well.

In return for his legacy, McDonogh asked "that it be permitted annually for children to plant and water a few flowers around [his] grave." Since 1875, the students at McDonogh School have honored this wish in the school's annual Founder's Day ceremony. In New Orleans, the annual ceremony became subject to one of the first protests of the civil rights era, the McDonogh Day Boycott of 1954. African American advocacy groups, including the NAACP, objected to the tradition of white children going first and proposed allowing both racial groups to participate simultaneously on opposite sides; when this suggestion was rebuffed by police, a boycott was organized.

McDonogh No. 26 School is the last school in the metropolitan New Orleans area which honors this tradition. In their annual John McDonogh Day ceremony, students place flowers on the cenotaph in honor of McDonogh at the site of his former tomb in the McDonoghville Cemetery.

== Other monuments ==
In 1938, as part of the Federal Art Project, a bust of McDonogh by Angela Gregory was erected at what was designated "McDonogh Place", a small park in Uptown New Orleans at St. Charles Avenue and Toledano Street. In 1958, it was moved to Duncan Plaza by the new City Hall. On June 13, 2020, protestors toppled the bust of John McDonogh from its base in Duncan Plaza and tossed it into the Mississippi River. On June 14 the bust was retrieved from the river, and returned to city officials.

== See also ==
- McDonogh Day Boycott
- The McDonogh Three
