= McDonogh Day Boycott =

Civil rights protest in New Orleans, Louisiana

The McDonogh Day Boycott on 7 May 1954 was a protest by African American public school students, teachers, and principals in New Orleans. It was one of the city's first organized civil rights protests.

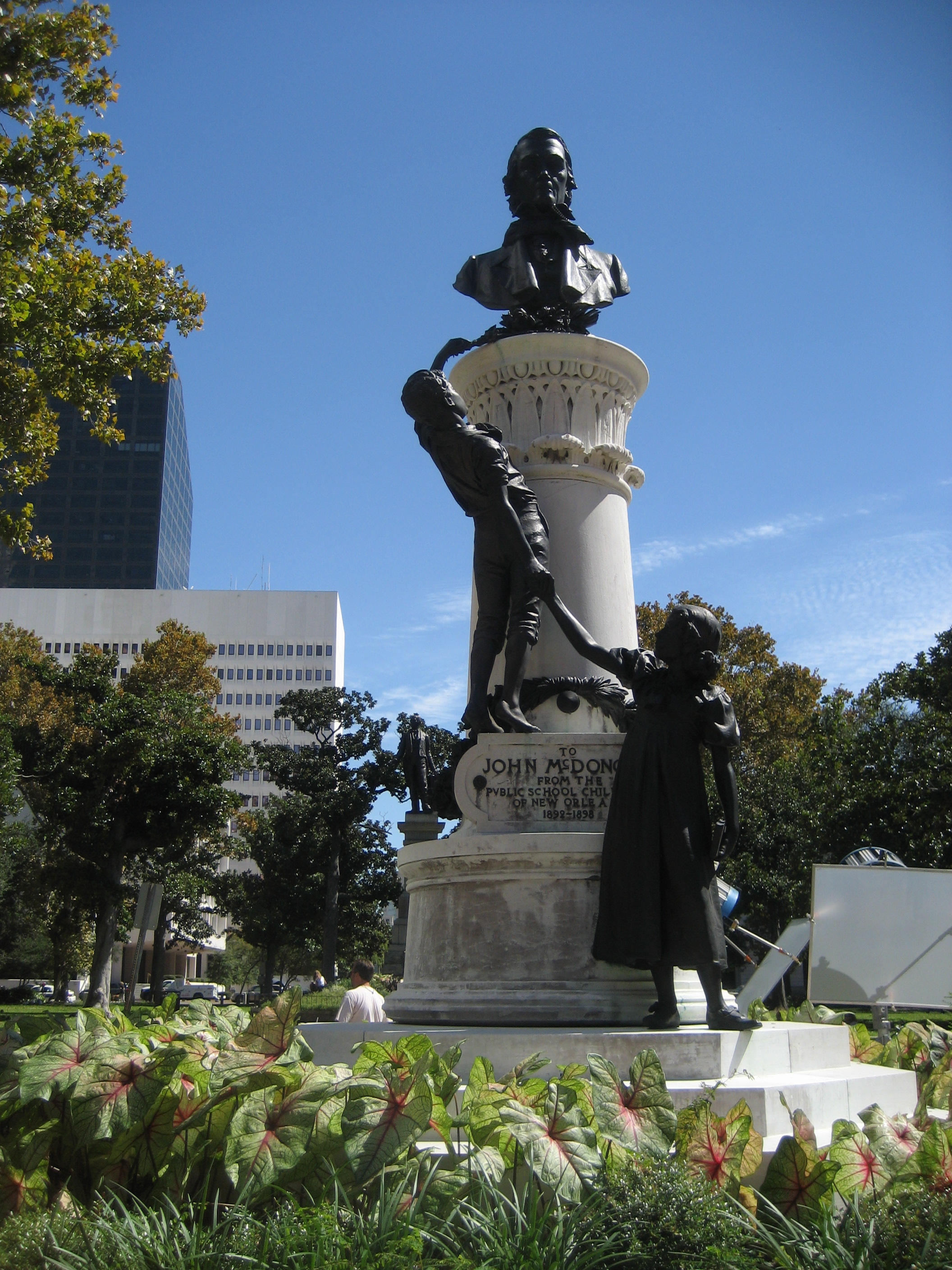
The John McDonogh Monument in Lafayette Square

McDonogh Day was, and remains to a very limited extent, a ritual in the New Orleans Public Schools. In May of every year, delegations of students would be brought to Lafayette Square, in front of what was then City Hall, to participate in a ceremony paying homage to the late John McDonogh, a 19th-century philanthropist who had endowed many of the public schools in the city. (Later, this tradition continued at the new civic center in Duncan Plaza.)

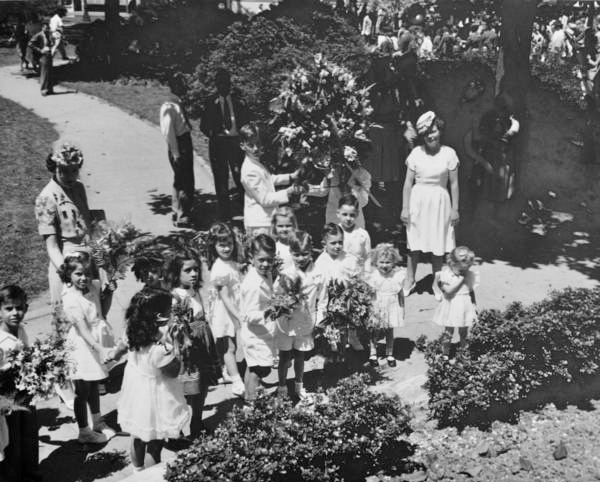
White students presenting flowers at the McDonogh monument on McDonogh Day in the 1930s

In the 1950s, the school system was racially segregated. On McDonogh Day, delegations from white schools would perform their ritual functions—place flowers at the McDonogh statue, sing, receive keys to the city from the mayor—and leave. Delegations from black schools, meanwhile, had to wait for a separate ceremony afterward, often standing all the while in hot, muggy, or otherwise uncomfortable New Orleans weather.

As McDonogh Day approached, black teachers' associations voiced protest over the procedure. Revius Ortique Jr. was a civil rights attorney who became the first black justice on the Louisiana Supreme Court in 1992 who during his 20 years as a private practitioner, was co-counselor on important civil rights cases involving equal pay for African Americans. In May 1954, Arthur Chapital, the director of the local NAACP branch in the 1950s, urged Ortique to make radio broadcasts calling for black parents to keep their children home during the McDonogh Day Ceremonies. Ortique, currently vice president at large of the Louisiana Council of Labor and employee of the state Department of Labor, agreed, sparking one of the city's first protests of the civil rights era.

The boycott was near-total. Of 32,000 African American students in the system, only 34 attended, along with one school principal. Mayor Chep Morrison was left holding surplus keys to the city.

The protest was repeated for another two years.

As for John McDonogh (died 1850), his will did leave money to the cities of New Orleans and Baltimore, Maryland, with the following stipulation, "...that the legacies to the two cities are for certain purposes of public utility, and especially for the establishment and support of free schools in said cities and their respective suburbs, (including the town of McDonogh, as a suburb of New Orleans,) wherein the poor, and the poor only, of both sexes, of all classes and castes of color, shall have admittance, free of expense, for the purpose of being instructed in the knowledge of the Lord, and in reading, writing, arithmetic, history, geography, and singing."

== Context ==
John McDonogh, born in Baltimore, Maryland on December 29, 1779, began his early career as a merchant selling American and European goods. His early success as a merchant led to his following endeavors, becoming a successful real estate investor, owning over 600,000 acres in New Orleans and joining the board of directors of the Bank of Louisiana in 1805 as a testament to his rapid success. Along with his acquisition of large amounts of land, McDonogh Increased his enslaved workforce to 192 men. Despite an 1830 Louisiana law prohibiting it, McDonogh educated the people he owned, even sending two men to study at Lafayette College in Pennsylvania. On October 26, 1850, John McDonogh died in his home in McDonoghville, leaving the bulk of his estate to New Orleans and Baltimore for the establishment of free schools.

Although John McDonogh intended for his estate to be used to educate children regardless of race, officials' initial allocations funded the construction of a whites-only school, and not until New Orleans enrolled both white and black children did McDonogh's funds support education for African Americans. By the time the complicated details had been resolved and McDonogh's request granted, officials of the school board began naming schools after John McDonogh, each followed by a number. In total, over 30 public schools had been established bearing McDonogh's name.

== See also ==
- The McDonogh Three
