= Terrytown, Louisiana =

- Census-designated place
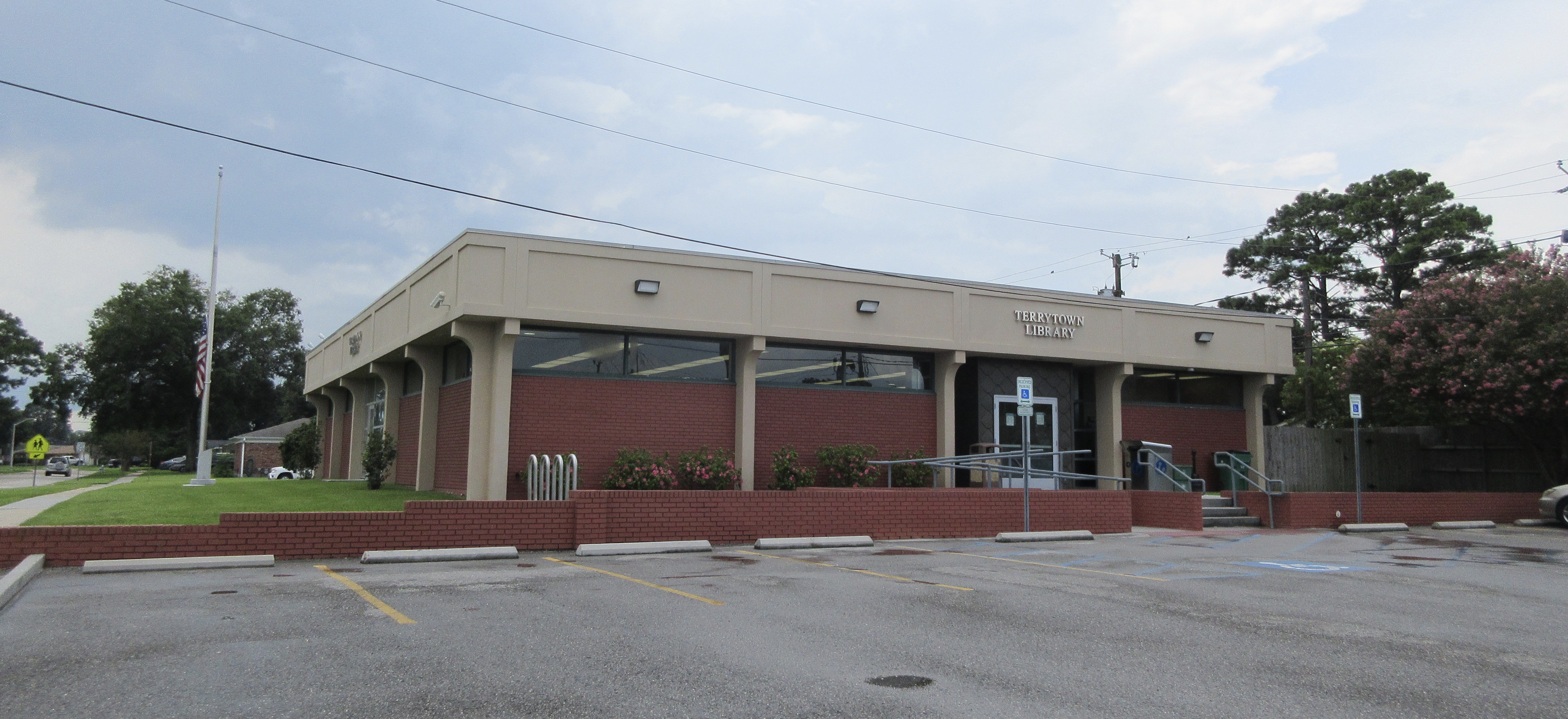
- Terrytown Library

- Location of Terrytown in Louisiana
- Coordinates: 29°54′08″N 90°01′46″W
- Country: United States
- State: Louisiana
- Parish: Jefferson

Area
  - Total: 3.69 sq mi (9.57 km^{2})
  - Land: 3.66 sq mi (9.49 km^{2})
  - Water: 0.031 sq mi (0.08 km^{2})
- Elevation: −3 ft (−0.91 m)

Population (2020)
  - Total: 25,278
  - Density: 6,899/sq mi (2,663.8/km^{2})
- Time zone: UTC-6 (CST)
  - Summer (DST): UTC-5 (CDT)
- ZIP Code: 70056
- Area code: 504
- GNIS feature ID: 2402921

Terrytown is an unincorporated community and census-designated place (CDP) in Jefferson Parish, Louisiana, United States. It is on the "Westbank" (to the south) of the Mississippi River. It is a suburb within the New Orleans–Metairie–Kenner metropolitan statistical area. The population was 23,319 at the 2010 census, and 25,278 in 2020.

Terrytown was opened to a media tour on March 5, 1960, showcasing the newest of concepts in home construction at the time, with the original homes having all plumbing in one wall. The community was opened to the public and considered founded on March 6, 1960, by subdivision developer Paul Kapelow, who named the town after his first daughter, Terry Kapelow. Terrytown includes Oakwood Center, a major shopping mall in the New Orleans metropolitan area.

== Geography ==
Terrytown is located on the eastern edge of Jefferson Parish at 29°54′8″N 90°1′46″W (29.902356, -90.029475). It is bordered to the northeast by New Orleans in Orleans Parish, to the west by Gretna, to the south by Timberlane, and to the southeast by Belle Chasse in Plaquemines Parish. According to the United States Census Bureau, the Terrytown CDP has a total area of 3.72 square miles (9.64 km^{2}), of which 3.68 square miles (9.52 km^{2}) are land and 0.05 square miles (0.12 km^{2}), or 1.24%, are water.

Louisiana Highway 23 (Belle Chasse Highway) forms the southwest border of Terrytown, and Highway 428 (Behrman Highway) runs through the eastern part of the community. The two main intersecting streets in Terrytown are Terry Parkway, running north and south, and Carol Sue Avenue (named for Paul Kapelow's second daughter, Carol Sue Kapelow), running east and west.

== Demographics ==
Historical population
Census	Pop.	Note	%±
1970	13,832		—
1980	23,548		70.2%
1990	23,787		1.0%
2000	25,430		6.9%
2010	23,319		−8.3%
2020	25,278		8.4%
U.S. Decennial Census; 1960 1970 1980; 1990 2000 2010 2020

Terrytown first appeared as an unincorporated community in the 1970 U.S. census; and as a census designated place in the 1980 United States census.

Terrytown CDP, Louisiana – Racial and ethnic composition Note: the U.S. Census Bureau treats Hispanic/Latino as an ethnic category. This table excludes Latinos from the racial categories and assigns them to a separate category. Hispanics/Latinos may be of any race.
Race / Ethnicity (NH = Non-Hispanic)	Pop 2000	Pop 2010	Pop 2020	% 2000	% 2010	% 2020
White alone (NH)	12,921	8,708	6,518	50.81%	37.34%	25.79%
Black or African American alone (NH)	8,730	9,093	9,660	34.33%	38.99%	38.22%
Native American or Alaska Native alone (NH)	111	77	45	0.44%	0.33%	0.18%
Asian alone (NH)	880	941	1,184	3.46%	4.04%	4.68%
Native Hawaiian or Pacific Islander alone (NH)	10	11	21	0.04%	0.05%	0.08%
Other race alone (NH)	66	75	130	0.26%	0.32%	0.51%
Mixed race or Multiracial (NH)	506	346	708	1.99%	1.48%	2.80%
Hispanic or Latino (any race)	2,206	4,068	7,012	8.67%	17.45%	27.74%
Total	25,430	23,319	25,278	100.00%	100.00%	100.00%

According to the 2010 U.S. census, there were 23,320 people, 8,121 households, and 6,458 families residing in the CDP. The population density was 6,347 inhabitants per square mile (2,451/km^{2}). There were 9,401 housing units at an average density of 2,412 per square mile (931/km^{2}). The racial makeup of the CDP was 34.90% White, 32.80% African American, 0.61% Native American, 10.34% Asian, 0.28% Pacific Islander, 5.82% from other races, and 2.98% from two or more races. Hispanic or Latino American people of any race were 28.97% of the population.

There were 9,344 households, out of which 38.2% had children under the age of 18 living with them, 47.2% were married couples living together, 20.0% had a female householder with no husband present, and 27.3% were non-families. 22.2% of all households were made up of individuals, and 5.0% had someone living alone who was 65 years of age or older. The average household size was 2.72 and the average family size was 3.19.

In the CDP, the population was spread out, with 29.0% under the age of 18, 10.1% from 18 to 24, 32.2% from 25 to 44, 20.7% from 45 to 64, and 7.9% who were 65 years of age or older. The median age was 32 years. For every 100 females, there were 90.7 males. For every 100 females age 18 and over, there were 85.9 males.

The median income for a household in the CDP was $36,897, and the median income for a family was $41,963. Males had a median income of $31,421 versus $23,241 for females. The per capita income for the CDP was $16,725. About 13.6% of families and 15.5% of the population were below the poverty line, including 24.3% of those under age 18 and 6.5% of those age 65 or over.

The 2019 American Community Survey estimated 24,953 people lived in the CDP. The racial and ethnic makeup was 32.1% non-Hispanic white, 39.4% Black or African American, 1.2% Native American, 3.1% Asian, 11.7% some other race, 4.7% two or more races, and 23.8% Hispanic and Latino American of any race. The median household income was $46,638, and 22.9% of the population lived at or below the poverty line. A year later, the 2020 U.S. census determined there were 25,278 people, 8,609 households, and 5,771 families residing in the CDP. Among the racial and ethnic demographic, 38.22% were Black or African American, 25.79% non-Hispanic white, 0.18% Native American, 4.68% Asian, 0.08% Pacific Islander, 3.32% two or more races, and 27.74% Hispanic or Latino American of any race.

Religiously, and in common with most of southern Louisiana, the predominant faith affiliated with has been Christianity and its Catholic Church, followed by Baptists of varying denominations. Among the Catholic population, most are served by the Roman Catholic Archdiocese of New Orleans; Baptists are divided among the Southern Baptist Convention and historically Black or African American Baptist denominations such as the National Baptist Convention, USA and National Baptist Convention of America among others.

== Education ==
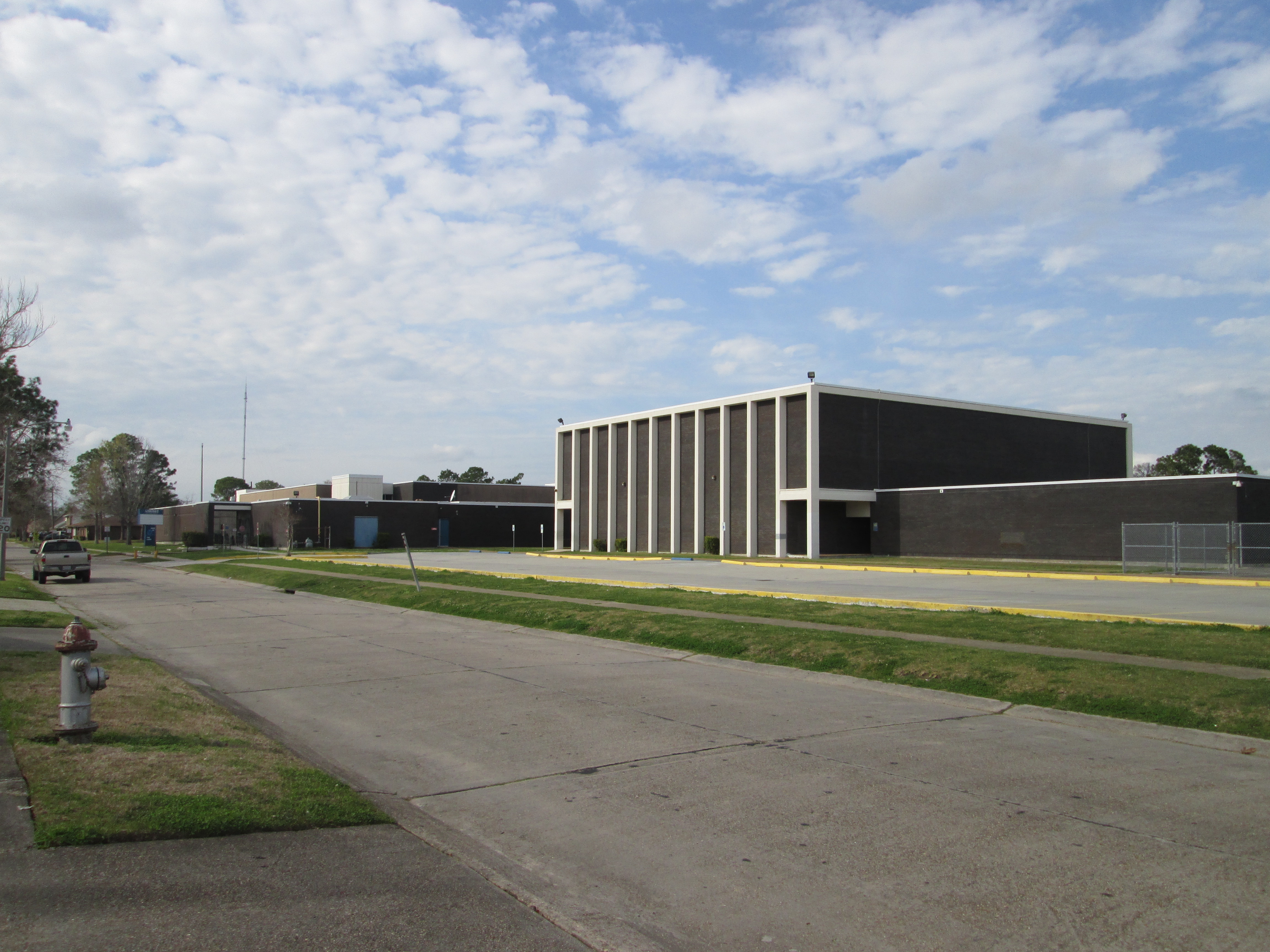
Livaudais Middle School

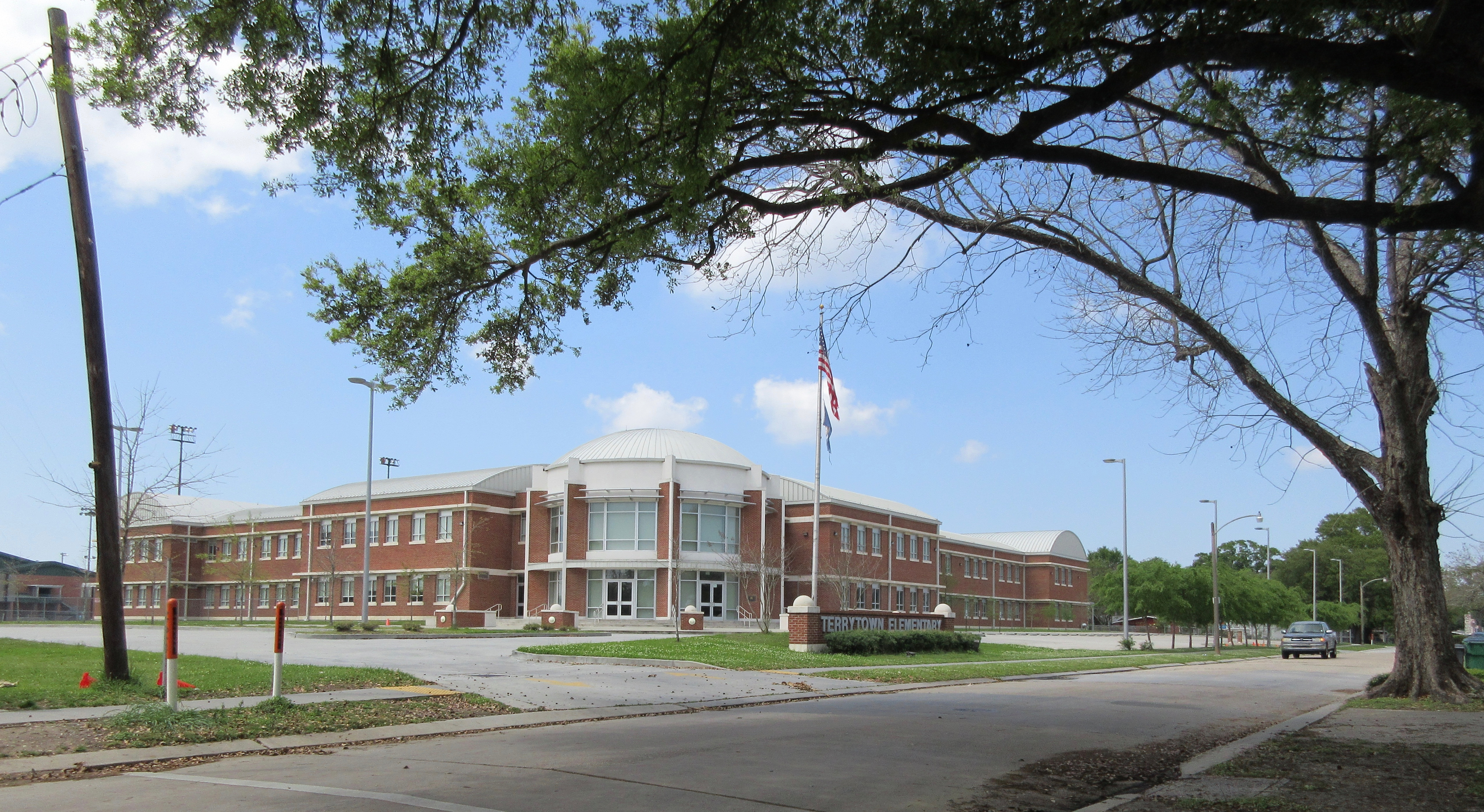
Terrytown Elementary School

Jefferson Parish Public Schools operates public schools which take students from the CDP.

Zoned schools include the following: For elementary school, Geraldine Boudreaux and Terrytown Elementary Schools in Terrytown serve most of Terrytown, while William Hart Elementary, in Gretna, serves a small portion. A small portion is zoned to McDonogh 26 in Gretna. Almost all of Terrytown is zoned to Livudais Middle School in Terrytown, while a small portion is zoned to Marrero Middle School. All residents are zoned to West Jefferson High School in Harvey.

In regards to advanced studies academies, residents are zoned to the Gretna Academy.

Kate Middleton Elementary in Gretna previously served a portion of Terrytown; it closed in 2012.

Private schools include:

- Christ the King Catholic Elementary School (Closed 2020)
- Stepping Stones Montessori
- Terrytown Academy
- Elmwood Park Academy

Jefferson Parish Library operates the Terrytown Library. The library is across the street from the Terrytown Playground, shares a parking lot with the Terrytown Golden Age Center, and is near Terrytown Elementary. The library first opened on October 9, 1974. In December 2009 the library closed for renovations. Chris Roberts, a parish council member, provided riverboat gaming funds to help renovate the library. The renovated library reopened on September 8, 2010, with a new main entrance.

== Notable people ==
- Bryan Adams, former member of the Louisiana House of Representatives from District 85 in Jefferson Parish, 2012–2016
