= Lamin Barrow =

American football player (born 1990)

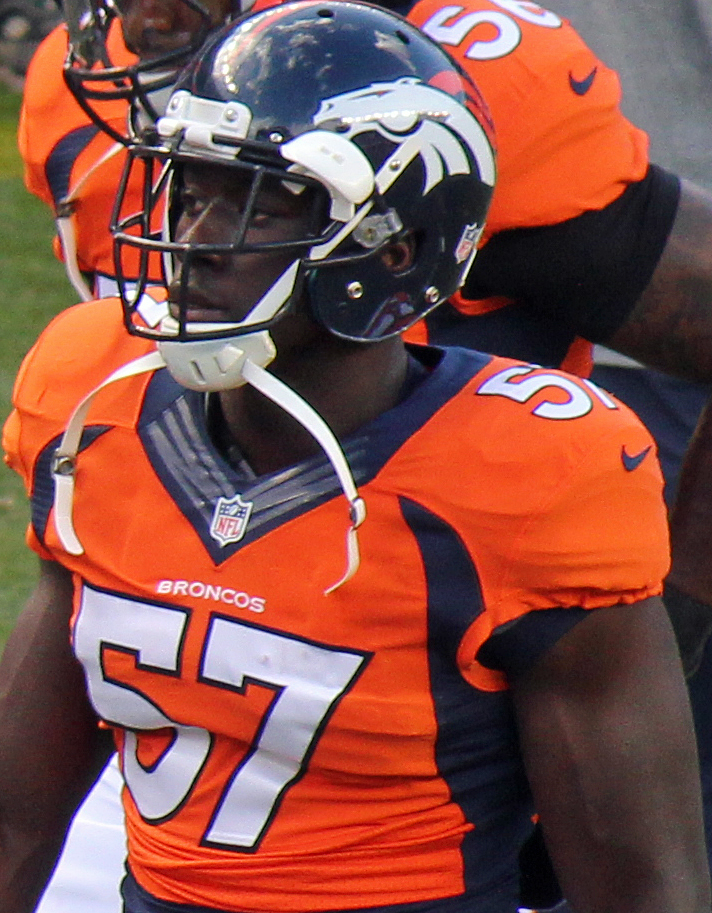
- Barrow with the Denver Broncos in 2014

No. 57
- Position: Linebacker

Personal information
- Born: November 29, 1990 (age 35); New Orleans, Louisiana, U.S.
- Listed height: 6 ft 1 in (1.85 m)
- Listed weight: 237 lb (108 kg)

Career information
- High school: John Ehret (Marrero)
- College: Louisiana State
- NFL draft: 2014: 5th round, 156th overall pick

Career history
- Denver Broncos (2014); Chicago Bears (2015–2016); Miami Dolphins (2016–2017)

Awards and highlights
- 2× Second-team All-SEC (2012, 2013)

Career NFL statistics
- Total tackles: 15
- Stats at Pro Football Reference

Lamin Samboujang Barrow (born November 29, 1990) is an American former professional football player who was a linebacker in the National Football League (NFL). He was selected by the Denver Broncos in the fifth round of the 2014 NFL draft. He played college football for the LSU Tigers.

== Early life ==
Barrow attended John Ehret High School in Marrero, Louisiana, where he played on the Patriots football team. He was named District 8-5A Defensive MVP and Louisiana Class 5A All-State as a senior. He recorded 71 tackles, 13 tackles for loss, nine quarterback hurries, two interceptions, five forced fumbles, and four fumbles recovered with two of those returned for touchdowns.

Considered a three-star recruit by the Rivals.com recruiting network, Barrow was rated as the 22nd best inside linebacker prospect of his class.

== College career ==
Barrow attended Louisiana State University where he played for the LSU Tigers football team from 2009 to 2013 under head coach Les Miles. During his collegiate career, he appeared in 51 games, including 28 starts, where he accumulated 230 tackles, including 14.5 for loss, 1.5 sacks, seven pass break-ups, one forced fumble, and four fumble recoveries. As a redshirt senior, he was named a second-team All-Southeastern Conference (SEC) selection.

== Professional career ==
=== Denver Broncos ===
Barrow was selected by the Denver Broncos in the fifth round (156th overall) of the 2014 NFL draft.

In 2014, Barrow played in all 16 games with one start in his rookie season with the Denver Broncos. On September 5, 2015, Barrow was waived by the team.

=== Chicago Bears ===
Barrow was signed to the practice squad of the Chicago Bears on September 7, 2015. On September 12, 2015, he was elevated to the active roster after Sam Acho's release.

Barrow was placed on injured reserve on August 31, 2016 after suffering a foot injury in the third preseason game. He was released by the Bears on December 5, 2016.

=== Miami Dolphins ===
On December 28, 2016, Barrow was signed to the Miami Dolphins' practice squad. He signed a reserve/future contract with the Dolphins on January 10, 2017.

On July 30, 2017, Barrow was waived/injured by the Dolphins and placed on injured reserve.

== Personal life ==
Barrow is of Gambian descent. His family was displaced by Hurricane Katrina in 2005, forcing them to move to Alexandria, Louisiana.
