= Jacoby Windmon =

American football player (born 2001)

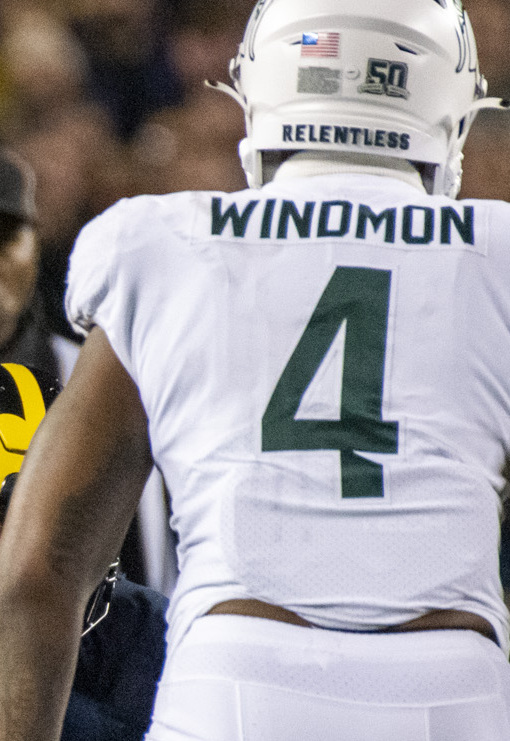
- Windmon with Michigan State in 2022

No. 53 – Pittsburgh Steelers
- Position: Linebacker
- Roster status: Practice squad

Personal information
- Born: August 20, 2001 (age 25); Marrero, Louisiana, U.S.
- Listed height: 6 ft 2 in (1.88 m)
- Listed weight: 250 lb (113 kg)

Career information
- High school: John Ehret (Jefferson Parish, Louisiana)
- College: UNLV (2019–2021); Michigan State (2022–2023)
- NFL draft: 2024: undrafted

Career history
- Pittsburgh Steelers (2024)*; Carolina Panthers (2024); Pittsburgh Steelers (2025)*; Carolina Panthers (2025)*; Columbus Aviators (2026); Pittsburgh Steelers (2026–present)*
- * Offseason or practice squad member only

Awards and highlights
- Second-team All-Mountain West (2021)

Career NFL statistics
- Total tackles: 22
- Sacks: 1.5
- Pass deflections: 2
- Stats at Pro Football Reference

Jacoby Tyrion Windmon (born August 20, 2001), nicknamed "the Windbreaker", is an American professional football linebacker for the Pittsburgh Steelers of the National Football League (NFL). He played college football at UNLV and Michigan State.

== Early life ==
Windmon grew up in New Orleans, Louisiana and attended John Ehret High School. He was rated a three-star recruit and committed to play college football at UNLV over offers from South Alabama and Tulane.

== College career ==
Windmon began his college career at UNLV. He joined the team as an early enrollee and expected to play tight end before being moved to defensive end and playing in all 12 games of the Rebels games. Windmon was named honorable mention All-Mountain West Conference as a sophomore after recording 39 tackles with two passes broken up and one forced fumble. He was named second-team All-Mountain West after leading UNLV with 118 tackles, 11 tackles for loss, and 6.5 sacks during his junior season. After the end of the season, Windmon entered the NCAA transfer portal.

Windmon ultimately transferred to Michigan State. He was named a starter at defensive end entering his first season with the team.

On December 11, 2023, Windmon announced that he would be entering the transfer portal for the second time. On January 4, 2024, he announced that he would instead declare for the 2024 NFL draft.

== Professional career ==
Pre-draft measurables
Height	Weight	Arm length	Hand span	Wingspan	40-yard dash	10-yard split	20-yard split	20-yard shuttle	Three-cone drill	Vertical jump	Broad jump	Bench press
6 ft 0 3/4 in (1.85 m)	235 lb (107 kg)	32 3/8 in (0.82 m)	9 5/8 in (0.24 m)	6 ft 4 3/4 in (1.95 m)	4.65 s	1.60 s	2.56 s	4.40 s	7.31 s	31.0 in (0.79 m)	9 ft 7 in (2.92 m)	16 reps
All values from Pro Day

=== Pittsburgh Steelers ===
Windmon signed with the Pittsburgh Steelers as an undrafted free agent on April 27, 2024. He was waived on August 27. On October 2, Windom was signed to the Steelers practice squad.

=== Carolina Panthers ===
On October 15, 2024, Windmon was signed off the Steelers practice squad to the Carolina Panthers active roster. He was released on November 5 and re-signed to the practice squad three days later. He was promoted to the active roster on December 17.

On August 25, 2025, Windmon was waived by the Panthers.

=== Pittsburgh Steelers (second stint) ===
On October 8, 2025, Windmon was signed to the Pittsburgh Steelers practice squad. He was released on October 28.

=== Carolina Panthers (second stint) ===
On November 19, 2025, Windmon was signed to the Carolina Panthers' practice squad. He signed a reserve/future contract with Carolina on January 12, 2026. On May 7, Windmon was waived by the Panthers.

=== Columbus Aviators ===
On May 14, 2026, Windmon signed with the Columbus Aviators of the United Football League (UFL).

=== Pittsburgh Steelers (third stint) ===
On June 16, 2026, Windmon signed with the Pittsburgh Steelers. Windmon was waived by the Steelers as a part of final roster cuts on August 30; he was re-signed to the team's practice squad the following day.
