= West Jefferson High School (Louisiana) =

Location
- 2200 8th Street; Harvey, Louisiana; United States; 29.9033°N 90.0741°W

Information
- Type: Public Secondary
- Established: 1955
- School district: Jefferson Parish School District
- Dean: Lamica Esteen, Willet Menard
- Principal: Adrienne Millet
- Teaching staff: 79.18 (FTE)
- Grades: 9-12
- Gender: Boys and Girls
- Enrollment: 1,707 (2023-2024)
- Student to teacher ratio: 21.56
- Colors: Scarlet and silver
- Athletics: American football, Baseball, Basketball, Soccer, Softball, Track, Volleyball, AFJROTC
- Mascot: Buccaneer
- Nickname: West Jeff, WJHS, WJ
- Team name: Buccaneers
- Rival: Helen Cox, John Ehret, LW Higgins, East Jefferson
- Affiliation: None
- Website: http://westjefferson.jpschools.org/

West Jefferson High School, also known as WJHS, and West Jeff is a public high school located in Harvey in unincorporated Jefferson Parish, Louisiana, United States, just outside New Orleans. It was founded in 1955. This is one of the schools in Jefferson Parish that offered a Laptop one to one initiative program. West Jefferson also offers transportation for students to and from school for free. This is a Title I school

It serves portions of several communities, including Harvey, Gretna, and Timberlane. All of Terrytown is in the West Jefferson attendance zone.

== History ==
West Jefferson High School was established in 1955, as the first consolidated high school on the West Bank of Jefferson Parish.

The school was damaged by Hurricane Katrina in 2005.

The school was damaged by a tornado on December 14th, 2022, along with Marrero Middle School.

In 2023 the school absorbed a portion of the attendance boundary of the closed Helen Cox High School.

== Enrollment ==
Students who live outside West Jefferson's specific school district may not be allowed to enroll in this school. West Jefferson had 1,398 students during this school year (2009–2010). Demographics show that the student body is 48% Hispanic, 42% Black, 6% White, 2% Mixed, 2% Asian/Pacific Islander, and 1% Other. There are 442 Freshmen (Ninth Graders), 380 Sophomores (Tenth Graders), 290 Juniors (Eleventh Graders), and 286 Seniors (Twelfth Graders). The ratio of gender is approximately 1:1.

== Athletics ==
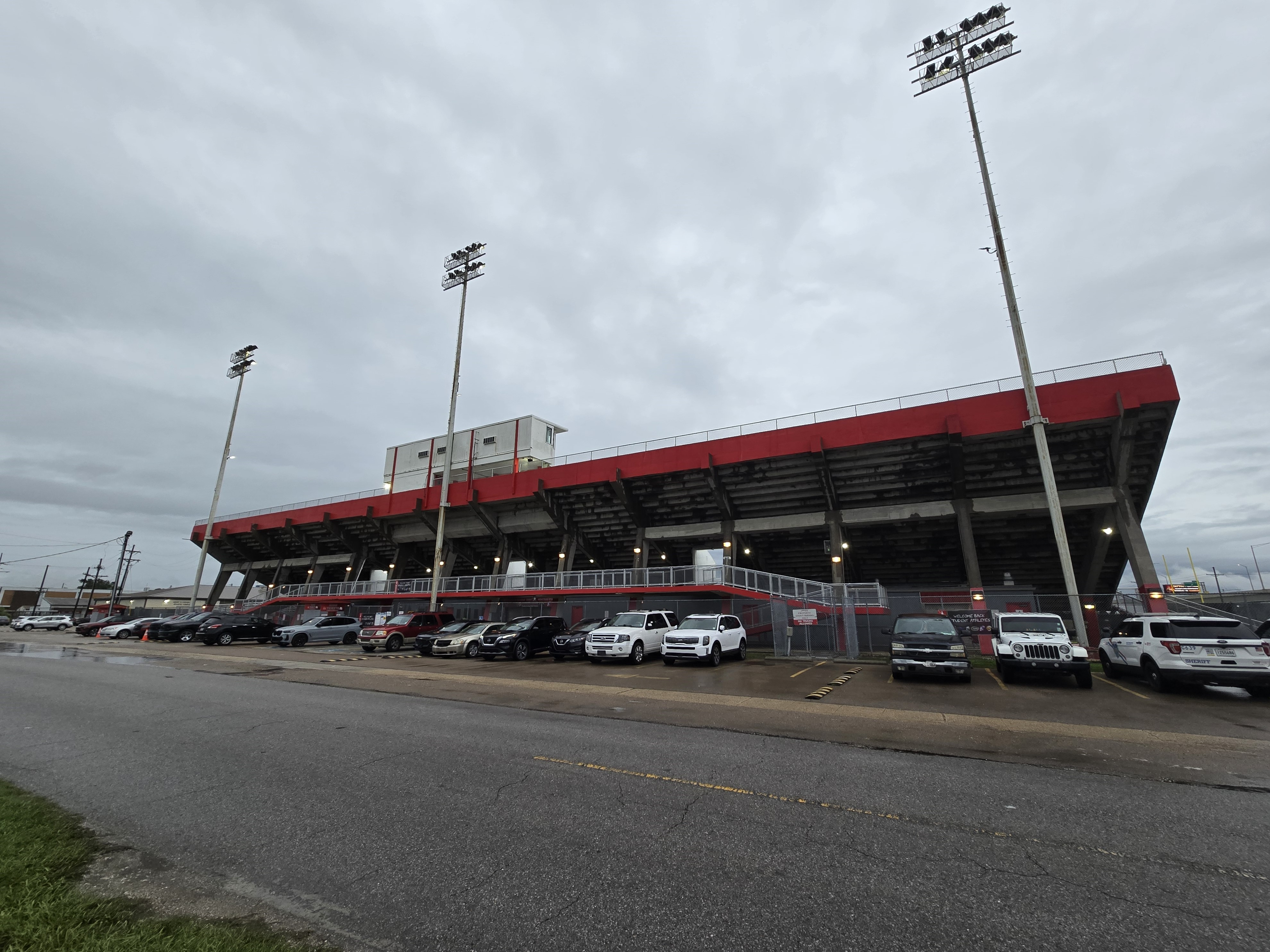
Harold "Hoss" Memtsas Stadium

West Jefferson High athletics compette in the LHSAA. Harold "Hoss" Memtsas Stadium that is located on the campus.

=== Championships ===
Football Championships

- (1) State Championship: 1970

== Notable alumni ==
- Robert Billiot, member of the Louisiana House of Representatives for Jefferson Parish from 2008–2020
- Bianca Del Rio, actor and costume designer; winner of RuPaul's Drag Race season 6
- Larry Dodgen, U.S. Army lieutenant general
- Parry Nickerson, NFL player
- Rocsi, radio and television host of 106 and Park
- Carl J. Barbier, United States District Judge for the Eastern District of Louisiana.
- Donald Ray Jones Sr, first African-American elected to the Jefferson Parish Council in the 20th century and the Jefferson Parish school board, representing council seat district 3 from 1991-2003.
