= Arden Cahill Academy =

Coordinates: 29.8681°N 90.0305°W

Arden Cahill Academy is a private school in Gretna, Louisiana, United States. It was founded in 1968 by Arden and Harry Cahill. The school serves families of newborns through high school students in the New Orleans metro community.
