= Rio Wells =

Canadian football player and MMA fighter

- Born: Rio Wells; New Orleans, Louisiana, U.S.
- Other names: The Quiet Storm
- Nationality: Canadian
- Height: 6 ft 0 in (1.83 m)
- Weight: 169.5 lb (77 kg; 12 st 2 lb)
- Division: Welterweight
- Reach: 75.6 in (192 cm)
- Style: Boxing, Brazilian Jiu-Jitsu, Judo
- Stance: Southpaw
- Fighting out of: Edmonton, Alberta, Canada
- Years active: 2009 – present (MMA)

Mixed martial arts record
- Total: 6
- Wins: 5
- By knockout: 4
- By submission: 1
- Losses: 1
- By submission: 1

Other information
- Occupation: MMA
- Mixed martial arts record from Sherdog
- Last updated on: June 22, 2011

Rio Wells is a former Canadian Football player and MMA fighter. He is from Edmonton, Alberta.

== Personal life ==
Wells was born in New Orleans in 1973. He attended John Ehret High School, the largest public school in the state of Louisiana. He was a star for the school's Football. As he played in high school with future NFL quarterback, Kordell Stewart, He was offered a scholarship to Fresno State. He Later went to the CFL to play football for five years.

== Football career ==
Wells Started playing football at the age of six. By him starting at such a young age, he was able to receive help and tips to prepare him for high school. He started his Football career at John Ehret High School in Marrero, LA, where Reggie Wayne would eventually start his career. He played alongside Kordell Stewart. By graduation, Wells had scholarships to many respected colleges including Fresno State University, where he ended up.

As soon as Wells landed in Fresno, He loved it instantly. He played well in college as a Defensive back, but he didn't make it to the NFL. Luckily, he attended CFL tryouts and made it to the Edmonton Eskimos. He wasn't shining in the CFL. He Played for 5 years with the CFL.

== Mixed martial arts career ==
When he neared the end of his playing career, Wells realized he needed some steady work. He began working with troubled youths as a mentor.

It's a job he continues now, and he said the work helps him keep his fighting career in perspective.

One of the first sports Wells tried after football was hockey. (He was, after all, living in Canada.) But then he joined a rugby team, which led to his introduction to MMA.

After their matches, the team would find a television to watch UFC events. Wells knew the sport existed, but it wasn't his first choice for his post-football athletic endeavor.

Not wanting to later regret failing to try, Wells located a local gym and got himself into every class he could find. The instructors liked his natural ability, so they encouraged him to come to the team tryout after just weeks.

Within two months of his first class, Wells was in his first fight, at an Evolution Fighting Championships show in September 2009.

"It lasted all of 20 seconds," he said. "The guy landed a kick to my quad, and I could feel the cramping coming, so I knew I couldn't go into another round. I said, 'I just need to end this as fast as I can,' and it was a knockout."

Within six months, Wells would be 3-0 with a string of victories. Since, he has prepared for his next chance – while continuing to help the 32 boys under his care work to improve their own lives. He can't make fighting his full-time profession, but he said that might actually help his career.

Wells is now 5-1-0 in his MMA career.
