= John Ehret High School =

Location
- 4300 Patriot St. Marrero address, Louisiana 70072-4394; United States; 29.8811°N 90.0914°W

Information
- Type: Public
- School district: Jefferson Parish Public Schools
- Principal: Cavin Davis
- Staff: 89.94 (FTE)
- Grades: 9–12
- Enrollment: 2,078 (2023-2024)
- Student to teacher ratio: 23.10
- Colors: Red, white, and blue
- Mascot: Patriot
- Nickname: Patriots
- Website: www.jpschools.org/ehret

John Ehret High School is a four-year public high school serving grades 9–12 located in unincorporated Jefferson Parish, Louisiana, United States, near the Marrero census-designated place (it has a Marrero postal address). The school, a part of the Jefferson Parish Public Schools, has an attendance boundary that includes several communities. Its service area includes portions of the City of Gretna, and portions of Marrero CDP, Harvey, Estelle, Timberlane, and Woodmere.

John Ehret High School currently ranks as a "B" school, according to the Louisiana Department of Education, and includes college Dual Enrollment, Advanced Placement, and a Gifted program. In addition, students have access to Music and Arts programs such as: Band, Music, Art, Theatre, and Digital Media. Sports at John Ehret High School include: football, soccer, basketball, indoor and outdoor track and field, volleyball, softball, baseball, wrestling, and spirit.

The school's mascot is the Patriot, and its colors are red, white, and blue. During Hurricane Katrina, the school suffered wind damage to many of its buildings.

== History ==
In November 2019, parents of a student with muscular dystrophy filed a lawsuit against the district on the grounds that Ehret High did not accommodate him.

Due to the COVID-19 pandemic in Louisiana, John Ehret High School stopped in-person classes on March 15, 2020, per Governor John Bel Edwards's orders. The 2020–2021 school year began with students having the option to attend school virtually or in a hybrid model.

In 2023 the school absorbed a portion of the attendance boundary of the closed Helen Cox High School.

== Activities ==
Historically Delgado Community College held evening classes at Ehret.

== School uniforms ==
The school requires its students to wear school uniforms.

== Athletics ==
John Ehret High athletics competes in the LHSAA.

Sports sponsored by the school:

- Baseball
- Boys' basketball
- Girls' basketball
- Cheerleading
- Cross Country
- Dance Team
- Flag team
- Football
- Majorettes
- Pep squad
- Soccer
- Softball
- Track & field
- Volleyball
- Wrestling
- Power Lifting

=== Championships ===
Football championships

- (2) State Championships: 1981, 1985

Boys' basketball championships

- (2) State Championships: 1993, 2006Class 5A.
- The team was the subject of an article in the April 2006 issue of Sports Illustrated, and ESPN featured on SportsCenter.
- The team was honored with an Award at the 2006 ESPYS.
- The team was also the subject of the 2009 film Hurricane Season.

Girls' basketball championships

- (1) State Championship: 2001

5A John Ehret held East St. John in the championship game 51-34

== Notable alumni ==
- Lamin Barrow (2009) NFL player
- Lucky Daye (born David Brown) – Grammy award winning singer-songwriter
- Michael Divinity (2016) – football player
- De'Jon Harris (2016) – NFL player
- Kimberly Willis Holt – writer of children's literature
- Patrick Jenkins (2020) – college football defensive tackle for the Tulane Green Wave
- Drake Nevis (2007) – defensive tackle with the Winnipeg Blue Bombers of the CFL
- Frank Ocean (born Christopher Lonny Edwin Breaux) (2005) – Grammy award winning singer-songwriter
- Elfrid Payton (2011) – NBA basketball player with the Phoenix Suns
- Kordell Stewart – former NFL quarterback with the Pittsburgh Steelers, Chicago Bears, and Baltimore Ravens
- Zavion Thomas – NFL football wide receiver and kickoff returner for the Chicago Bears
- Carmen J. Walters (born Carmen J. Hawkins) – academic administrator
- Reggie Wayne (1997) – former NFL wide receiver with the Indianapolis Colts
- Rio Wells – former defensive back with the Fresno State Bulldogs and Edmonton Eskimos
- Darrel Williams (2014) – NFL running back
- Jacoby Windmon (2019) – college football defensive end for the Michigan State Spartans
