= Oakwood Center =

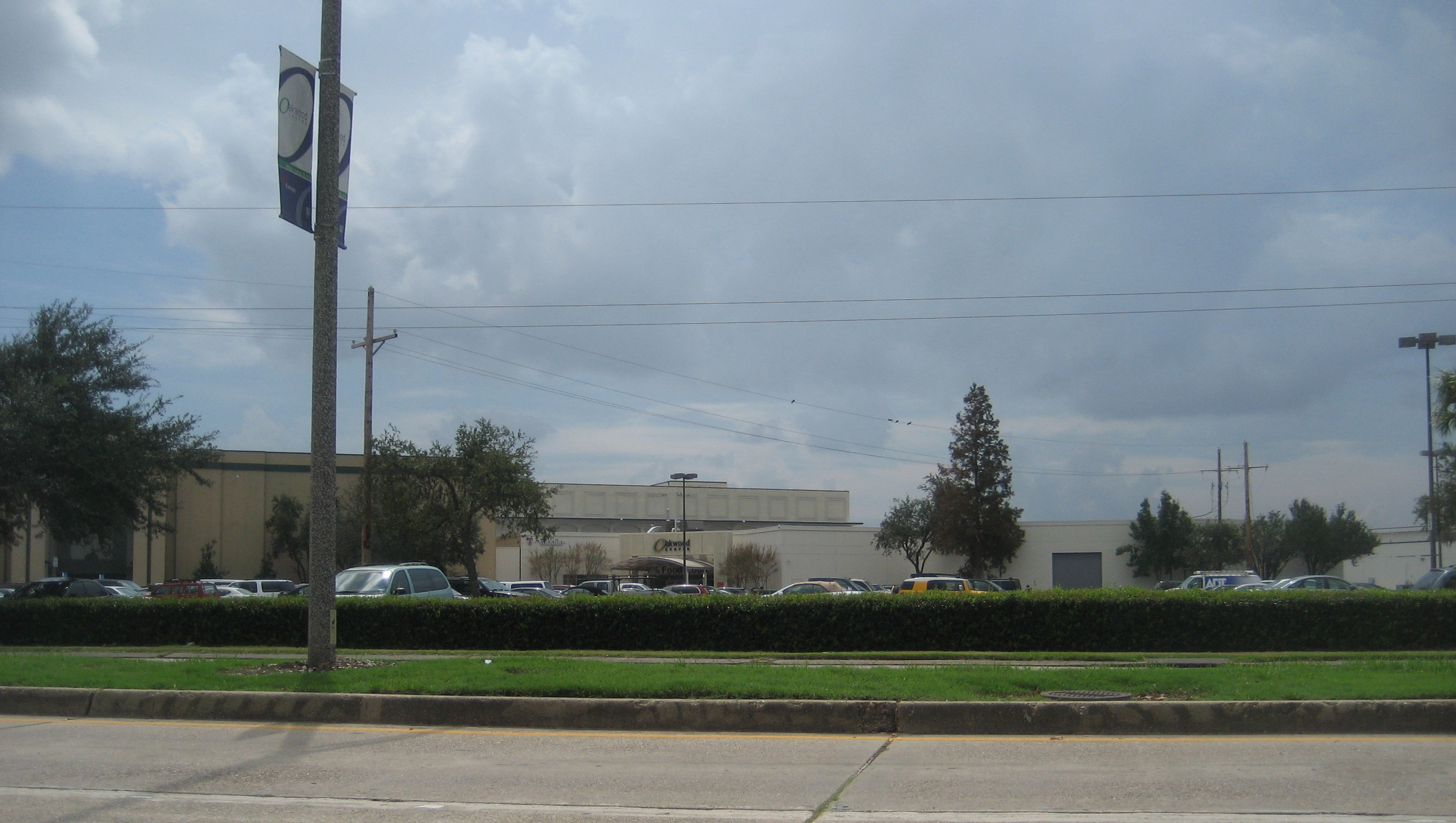
- Main entrance is seen from Terry Parkway
- Location: Gretna, Louisiana, United States
- Coordinates: 29.92138°N 90.03831°W
- Address: 197 Westbank Expressway
- Opened: 1966; 60 years ago (original); 2007 (new mall)
- Renovated: 2007
- Manager: GGP
- Owner: GGP
- Num. of stores: 81
- Num. of anchor tenants: 6 (5 open, 1 vacant)
- Floor area: 907,145 sq ft (84,276.5 m^{2})
- Floors: 1 (2 in all anchors)
- Parking: 4,600 spaces
- Website: www.oakwoodcenter.com

Oakwood Center is a major shopping mall in Terrytown, Louisiana, on the West Bank of the Mississippi River in the New Orleans metropolitan area. It was originally named "Oakwood Mall", and some signage and local usage continue to call it that. It is geographically in Terrytown, but the mailing address is adjacent Gretna, Louisiana. The anchor stores are Dick's Sporting Goods, Old Navy, Shoe Dept. Encore, JCPenney, and Dillard's. There is 1 vacant anchor store that was once Sears.

== History ==
"Oakwood Mall" opened in 1966, taking advantage of the increased development on the West Bank following the opening of the Crescent City Connection. One of the former anchor stores was D. H. Holmes. It was replaced by a Dillard's store in 1992, and then by Marshalls.

Oakwood Center fell victim to significant damage in the aftermath of Hurricane Katrina. The mall was heavily looted and set on fire on August 31, 2005. Nearly 80% of the stores experienced fire or water damage. The main shopping area was closed during demolition and construction. Two department stores, Sears and Dillard's, along with Dollar Tree, Foot Locker, and the Bank of Louisiana reopened before the entire mall reopened. Oakwood Center completely reopened on October 19, 2007, except for the Mervyn's wing.

Forever 21 and Shoe Department Encore replaced the Marshalls.

In 2013, it was confirmed that the Mervyn's wing would be torn down for Dick's Sporting Goods.

After renovations, the center includes three sit-down restaurants; over 360,000 square feet (33,000 m^{2}) of floor space boasting over 80 specialty shops (regional and national retailers); and a 20,000-square-foot (1,900 m^{2}) food pavilion.

On January 5, 2017, it was announced that Sears would be closing as part of a plan to close 104 stores nationwide. The store closed in March 2017.
