= Gretna Heritage Festival =

Culture festival in Gretna, Louisiana

Gretna Heritage Festival is a culture festival in Gretna, Louisiana. The festival offers food, arts & crafts, rides & games, and music.

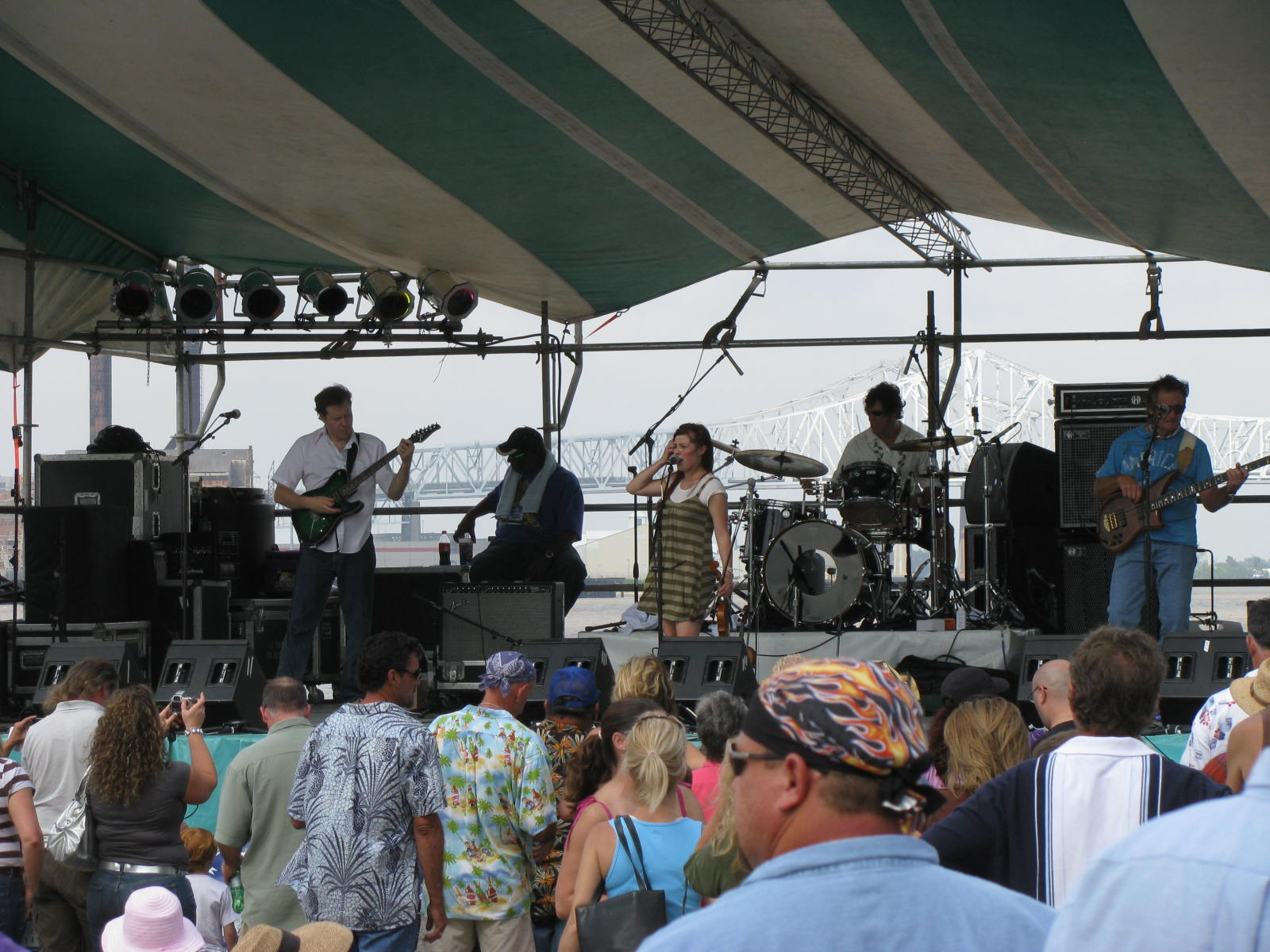
Amanda Shaw & the Cute Guys performing at Gretna Heritage Festival 2008

The festival started in 1994 (31 years ago) as a small community event. It has since grown to one of the largest festivals in Jefferson Parish, Louisiana.

Prominent acts have included Travis Tritt, The Beach Boys, Hunter Hayes, Charlie Daniels, Blue Öyster Cult, Joe Diffie, David Allan Coe, Chicago, Brooks & Dunn, Bonerama, Theresa Andersson, and Ricky Van Shelton.

The festival was canceled in 2020 and 2021 due to the COVID-19 pandemic.
