= Bryan Adams (politician) =

American politician

Bryan Joseph Adams

Louisiana State Representative for District 85 (Jefferson Parish)
- In office January 9, 2012 – May 2016
- Preceded by: Ricky Templet
- Succeeded by: Joseph A. Marino, III

Personal details
- Born: November 27, 1962 (age 63) New Orleans, Louisiana, U.S.
- Party: Republican
- Children: 2
- Education: River Oaks Academy
- Occupation: Louisiana State Fire Marshal

Bryan Joseph Adams (born November 1, 1962) is a Republican former member of the Louisiana House of Representatives for District 85, which encompasses Gretna, the seat of suburban Jefferson Parish and Terrytown, where Adams is the former volunteer fire chief.

In his announcement of candidacy in 2011, Adams, a native of New Orleans, Louisiana, cited his priorities as crime fighting, flood protection, tackling erosion of the coastal wetlands, and support for emergency services. He pledged accessibility to constituents. In a low-turnout primary election held on October 22, 2011, Adams defeated his opponent, real estate agent and fellow Republican Stephen Leonard, 3,924 (57.2 percent) to 2,948 (42.8 percent).

Adams is a 1981 graduate of River Oaks Academy in Belle Chasse in Plaquemines Parish. He holds certificates in firefighting from federal, state and local governments through Louisiana State University in Baton Rouge and the United States Department of Homeland Security.

Adams said he will work to control blight by the removal of buildings which pose fire hazards or become a haven for crime. Adams proposed in his campaign that the state impose greater penalties for derelict property owners than those within the local code enforcement. Adams considers himself "a boots on the ground kind of guy" in the legislature.

Adams succeeded Republican Representative Ricky Templet of Gretna, who did not seek reelection but instead was elected to the Jefferson Parish Council.

Adams resigned from the House in May 2016 to become the assistant state fire marshal. He was succeeded by an Independent, attorney Joseph A. Marino, III, who ran without opposition in a special election called for July 1. In that no one else ran for the post, the special election was cancelled, and Marino assumed Adams' seat.

Adams is Single

Louisiana House of Representatives
Preceded by Ricky Templet	Louisiana State Representative for District 85 (Jefferson Parish); Bryan Joseph Adams; 2012–2016	Succeeded by Joseph A. Marino, III
