= Helen Cox High School =

Location
- 2200 Lapalco Boulevard; Harvey, Louisiana 70058-3075; United States
- 29.8740°N 90.0554°W

Information
- Type: Public
- Motto: Maturity, Responsibility, and Self-Discipline
- Established: 1969
- Closed: 2023
- School district: Jefferson Parish Public Schools
- Staff: 34.00 (FTE)
- Grades: 9–12
- Enrollment: 817 (2021–22)
- Student to teacher ratio: 24.03
- Colors: Scarlet (Red), (Vegas) Gold
- Athletics conference: LHSAA 10-4A
- Mascot: "Charlie" the Cougar
- Song: Hail to Thee Dear Helen Cox
- Website: http://helencox.jppss.k12.la.us/

Helen Cox High School was a high school located in Harvey, in unincorporated area Jefferson Parish, Louisiana, United States.

It served portions of several communities, including Harvey, Gretna, Timberlane, and Woodmere.

The school was a part of the Jefferson Parish Public Schools system. The school primarily served the Harvey and Gretna areas of Jefferson Parish. The school's mascot was "Charlie" the Cougar (Felis concolor), and the school colors were scarlet (red) and (vegas) gold.

== History ==
Helen Cox's namesake was the first principal of the Gretna Public High School. It was first opened in 1969. Helen Cox was once a middle school (6th-8th grade), then became a junior high school (7th-9th grade) and in 2004 Helen Cox became a high school (9th-12th grade).

The school was closed at the end of the 2022-23 school year by Jefferson Parish School Board, along with Grace King High School, with HCHS students being absorbed into John Ehret High School and West Jefferson High School.

== Athletics ==
Helen Cox High athletics competed in the LHSAA.

== Notable alumni ==
- Greg Monroe (2008), NBA player
