= William H. Seymour =

American politician and historian

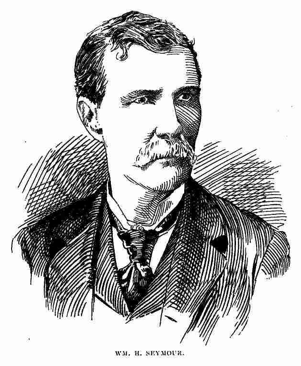
Judge Wm. H. Seymour

William Henry Seymour (September 8, 1840 – December 24, 1913), was an American politician and amateur historian best known for having written a history of Algiers, Louisiana.

== Early life ==
Seymour was born in Warrenton, Warren County, Mississippi. He lived in Europe as a child, then moved to Louisiana while still a dependent of his parents.

== Career ==
At the outset of the American Civil War, he enlisted in the Confederate Army, becoming an artillery sergeant and receiving an honorable discharge.

In 1863, he moved to Algiers, Louisiana, where he was initially employed by the Opelousas Railroad. Algiers, across the Mississippi River from New Orleans, was then an independent municipality, but would be within a few years annexed to the city.

Seymour took an interest in local affairs and was elected in 1864 to the Louisiana Constitutional Convention, where he was the youngest delegate. Also in 1864 Seymour was elected justice of the peace and president of the parish police jury. In 1865, Seymour was elected to the Louisiana state legislature.

Seymour authored The Story of Algiers, a 128-page history published in 1896. The book was republished in 1971 and has been referenced in New Orleans and Louisiana histories. An index of the book is on-line.

=== Judicial career ===
He was admitted to the state bar association in 1881. From 1892 through 1896, he served as elected judge of the Third City Court.
