= Gretna, Louisiana =

- City
- City of Gretna
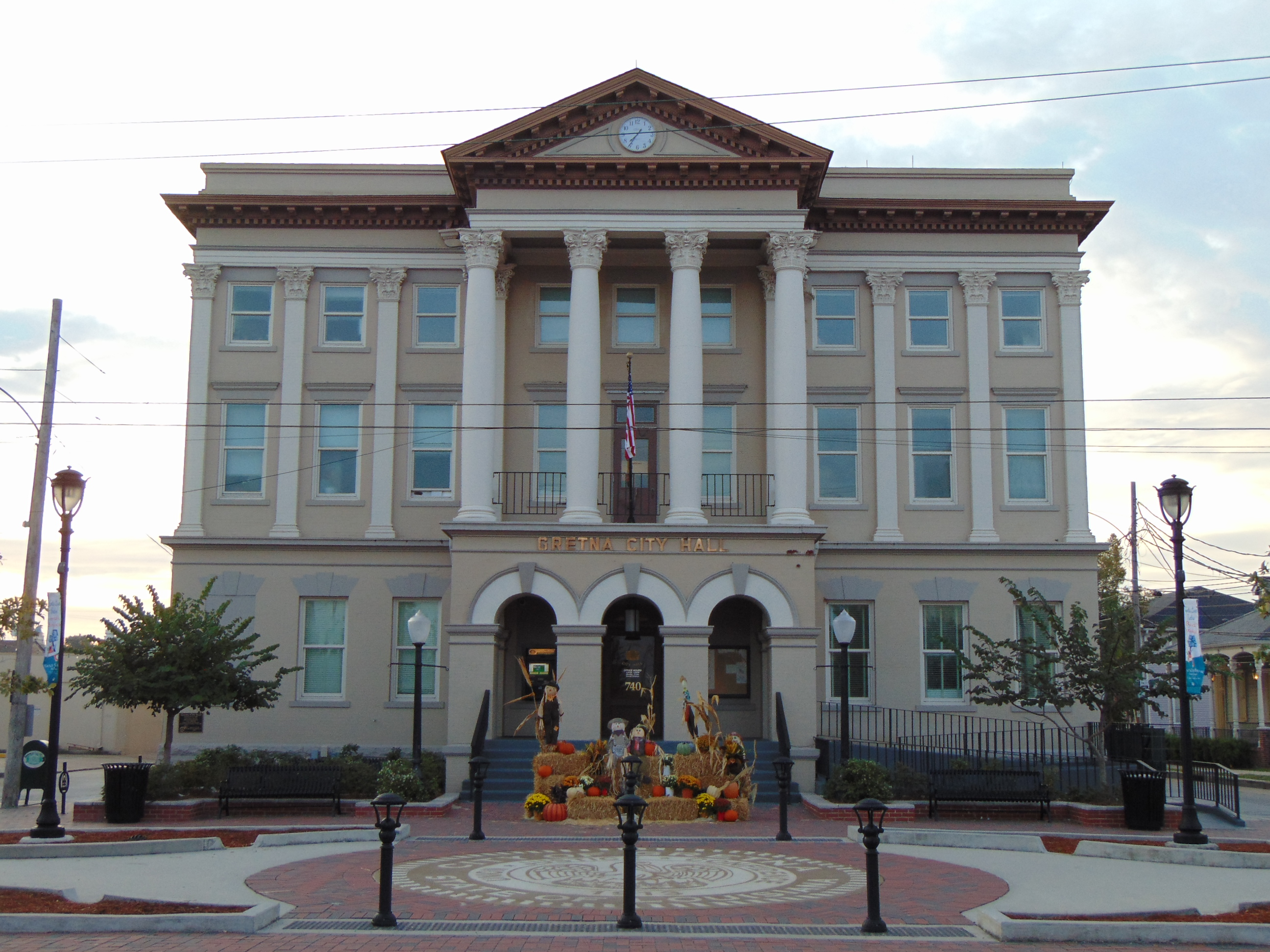
- Gretna City Hall

- Flag Seal Logo

- Location of Gretna in Jefferson Parish, Louisiana.

- Location of Louisiana in the United States
- Coordinates: 29°53′25″N 90°02′42″W
- Country: United States
- State: Louisiana
- Parish: Jefferson

Government
  - Mayor: Belinda Cambre Constant

Area
  - Total: 4.49 sq mi (11.64 km^{2})
  - Land: 4.03 sq mi (10.45 km^{2})
  - Water: 0.46 sq mi (1.19 km^{2})
- Elevation: 0 ft (0 m)

Population (2020)
  - Total: 17,814
  - Rank: JE: 2nd
  - Density: 4,414.3/sq mi (1,704.37/km^{2})
- Time zone: UTC-6 (CST)
  - Summer (DST): UTC-5 (CDT)
- ZIP codes: 70053, 70054, 70056
- Area code: 504
- FIPS code: 22-31915
- GNIS feature ID: 2403761
- Website: www.gretnala.com

Gretna is the second-largest city in, and parish seat of, Jefferson Parish in the U.S. state of Louisiana. Gretna lies on the west bank of the Mississippi River, just east and across the river from uptown New Orleans. It is part of the New Orleans–Metairie–Kenner metropolitan statistical area. The population was 17,814 at the 2020 U.S. census.

== History ==
According to the history published by the city, Gretna's history can be traced to a plantation established by Jean-Charles de Pradel by 1750 (when the plantation house, Monplaisir, was built). (Note: Monplaisir and its associated outbuildings were destroyed by a flood of the Mississippi River in the late 19th century.) By 1813, the plantation had passed into the hands of one François Bernoudy. John McDonogh (also spelled John McDonough), then a resident of New Orleans, bought the establishment, moved into the house and founded a settlement in 1815, that would be named McDonoghville. He subdivided the rest of the former plantation into regular city lots and 30-arpent farming strips. McDonoghville thus became the first subdivision in Jefferson Parish. (Note: McDonogh (1779 – 1850) became quite wealthy and owned a great deal of real estate around the New Orleans area.) McDonough either leased or sold these properties to white laborers or free people of color.

Gretna was settled in 1836, originally as Mechanikham, growing with a station on the Mississippi River for the Missouri Pacific Railroad, Texas and Pacific Railway, and Southern Pacific Railroad, with a ferry across the River to New Orleans. The famous food and spice company Zatarain's, founded in 1889 in New Orleans, has been located in Gretna since 1963. Gretna was incorporated in 1913, absorbing the section of McDonogh within the Jefferson Parish boundaries. In the 1940 census, Gretna had a population of 10,879.

=== Hurricane Katrina controversy ===
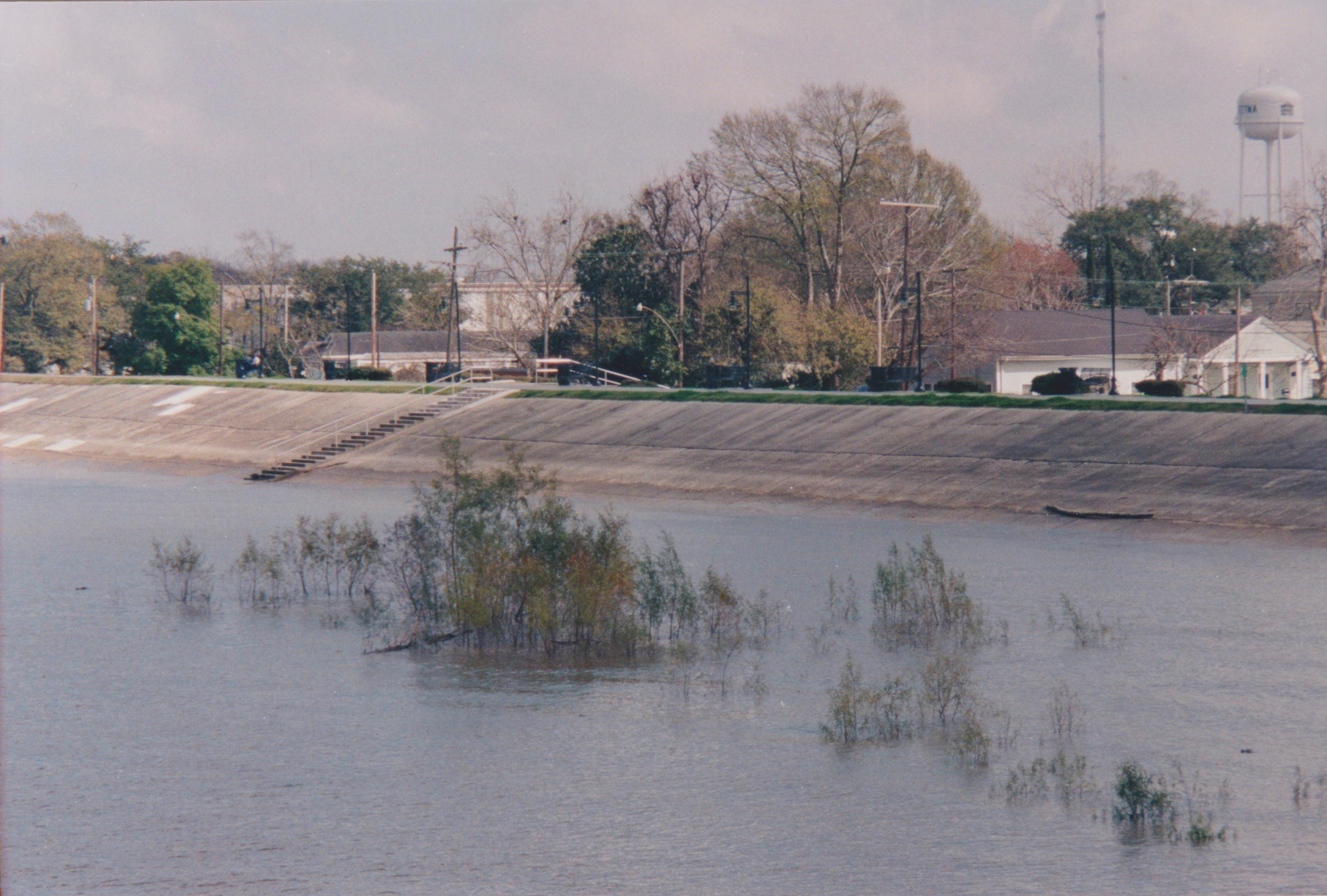
High water along the Mississippi River levee at Gretna, 2005

The city and its police received considerable press coverage when, in the aftermath of Hurricane Katrina on August 29, 2005, people who attempted to leave New Orleans on foot using the Crescent City Connection bridge to cross the Mississippi River were turned back at gunpoint by officers from the City of Gretna Police, Crescent City Connection Police, and Jefferson Parish Sheriff's deputies guarding a roadblock that had been set up on the bridge in the days following the hurricane. According to eyewitnesses, some officers threatened to shoot those coming from New Orleans as they attempted to cross into Gretna on foot, shots were fired overhead, and downdraft from a police helicopter was used to help clear refugees from the bridge. New Orleans Police Department 911 operator Patryce Jenkins, having walked the city for two days after her dispatch center was flooded, tried to return to her unflooded Gretna apartment via the bridge. Though she had ID to prove her status as a resident, she said instead of checking it police ordered her to turn back, used racial slurs, and fired a warning shot over her head, leaving her crying in disbelief.

Gretna mayor Ronnie Harris pointed out though the city had not flooded, Gretna had been severely damaged as well, losing power, water, and sewage services, claiming the city had no food, no water, no shelters, and no capacity to take refugees. Harris said that the city had commandeered buses and been transporting a crowd of about 6,000 refugees to a nearby FEMA facility. But he said the city enacted the blockade after a spate of door-to-door robberies began in Gretna and stores at the Oakwood Mall were looted and burned. Residents of Gretna were themselves required to evacuate after a few days. Four federal civil lawsuits were filed against the city for violation of civil rights. Two were dismissed, and in a third the Jefferson Parish Sheriff's Office settled with a family from Algiers for $10,000. A fourth federal case, involving Regional Transit Authority workers, was scheduled to go to trial in April 2011. The case would go on to be dismissed in September. Several other cases were filed in New Orleans Civil District Court.

== Geography ==
Location of Gretna, across the Mississippi River from uptown New Orleans, south of the French Quarter

Gretna has an elevation of 0 feet (0 m) behind the levee along the Mississippi River.

According to the United States Census Bureau, the city has a total area of 3.9 square miles (10 km^{2}), of which 3.5 sq mi (9.1 km^{2}) is land and 0.4 sq mi (1.0 km^{2}) (9.33%) is water.

== Demographics ==
Historical population
Census	Pop.	Note	%±
1850	717		—
1880	2,396		—
1890	3,332		39.1%
1920	7,197		—
1930	9,584		33.2%
1940	10,879		13.5%
1950	13,813		27.0%
1960	21,967		59.0%
1970	24,875		13.2%
1980	20,615		−17.1%
1990	17,208		−16.5%
2000	17,423		1.2%
2010	17,736		1.8%
2020	17,814		0.4%
2025 (est.)	17,360	▼	−2.5%
U.S. Decennial Census

Gretna city, Louisiana – Racial and ethnic composition Note: the U.S. Census Bureau treats Hispanic/Latino as an ethnic category. This table excludes Latinos from the racial categories and assigns them to a separate category. Hispanics/Latinos may be of any race.
Race / Ethnicity (NH = Non-Hispanic)	Pop 2000	Pop 2010	Pop 2020	% 2000	% 2010	% 2020
White alone (NH)	9,282	8,505	7,347	53.27%	47.95%	41.24%
Black or African American alone (NH)	6,154	5,961	5,872	35.32%	33.61%	32.96%
Native American or Alaska Native alone (NH)	89	80	84	0.51%	0.45%	0.47%
Asian alone (NH)	532	467	490	3.05%	2.63%	2.75%
Native Hawaiian or Pacific Islander alone (NH)	7	5	6	0.04%	0.03%	0.03%
Other race alone (NH)	37	34	119	0.21%	0.19%	0.67%
Mixed race or Multiracial (NH)	217	230	560	1.25%	1.30%	3.14%
Hispanic or Latino (any race)	1,105	2,454	3,336	6.34%	13.84%	18.73%
Total	17,423	17,736	17,814	100.00%	100.00%	100.00%

According to the 2020 United States census, there were 17,814 people residing in the city. The 2019 American Community Survey determined there were 7,156 households and 3,954 families residing in the city limits. In 2010, there were 17,736 people, 6,958 households, and 4,286 families residing in the city. The population density was 4,685 inhabitants per square mile (1,809/km^{2}). There were 7,665 housing units at an average density of 2,082 per square mile (804/km^{2}).

In 2020, the racial and ethnic makeup was 41.24% non-Hispanic white, 32.96% Black or African American, 0.47% Native American, 2.75% Asian, 0.03% Pacific Islander, 3.81% multiracial or some other race, and 18.73% Hispanic and Latino American of any race. In 2019, the racial and ethnic makeup of the city was 44.9% non-Hispanic White, 35.5% Black and African American, 0.3% American Indian and Alaska Native, 1.9% Asian, 0.1% Native Hawaiian and other Pacific Islander, 0.2% some other race, 1.3% two or more races, and 16% Hispanic and Latino American of any race. In 2010, the racial makeup of the city was 48.05% White, 20.43% African American, 1.20% Native American, 8.12% Asian, 0.15% Pacific Islander, 4.03% from other races, and 2.45% from two or more races. Hispanic or Latino Americans of any race were 24.38% of the population. From 2010 to 2020, the growth of Hispanic or Latino Americans reflected nationwide demographic trends of diversification and identity.

In 2010, there were 6,958 households, out of which 27.7% had children under the age of 18 living with them, 35.7% were married couples living together, 19.6% had a female householder with no husband present, and 38.4% were non-families. 32.7% of all households were made up of individuals, and 11.3% had someone living alone who was 65 years of age or older. The average household size was 2.40 and the average family size was 3.06.

In the city, the age distribution of the population shows 23.8% under the age of 18, 10.2% from 18 to 24, 30.6% from 25 to 44, 21.4% from 45 to 64, and 14.0% who were 65 years of age or older. The median age was 36 years, higher than Louisiana's median age of 34.0 years. For every 100 females, there were 100.1 males. For every 100 females age 18 and over, there were 98.3 males.

As of 2019, the median household income in Gretna was $47,244. Males had a median income of $44,902 versus $31,992 for females. Approximately 17.8% of the population lived at or below the poverty line. In 2010, the median income for a household in the city was $28,065, and the median income for a family was $31,881. Males had a median income of $28,259 versus $21,019 for females. The per capita income for the city was $15,735. About 20.8% of families and 24.2% of the population were below the poverty line, including 34.7% of those under age 18 and 20.2% of those age 65 or over.

== Government and infrastructure ==
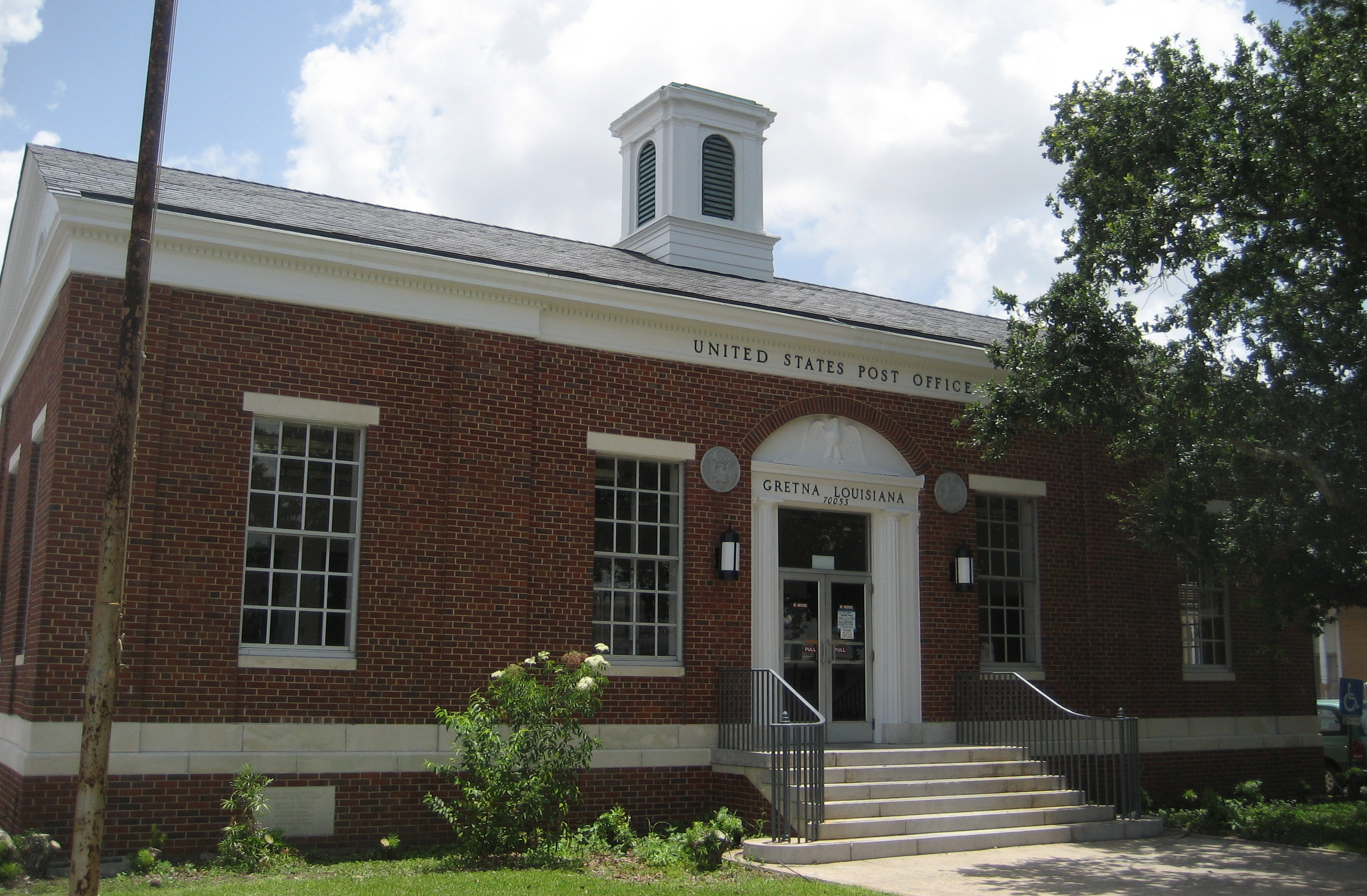
Gretna Post Office

The United States Postal Service operates the local Gretna Post Office.

=== Police ===
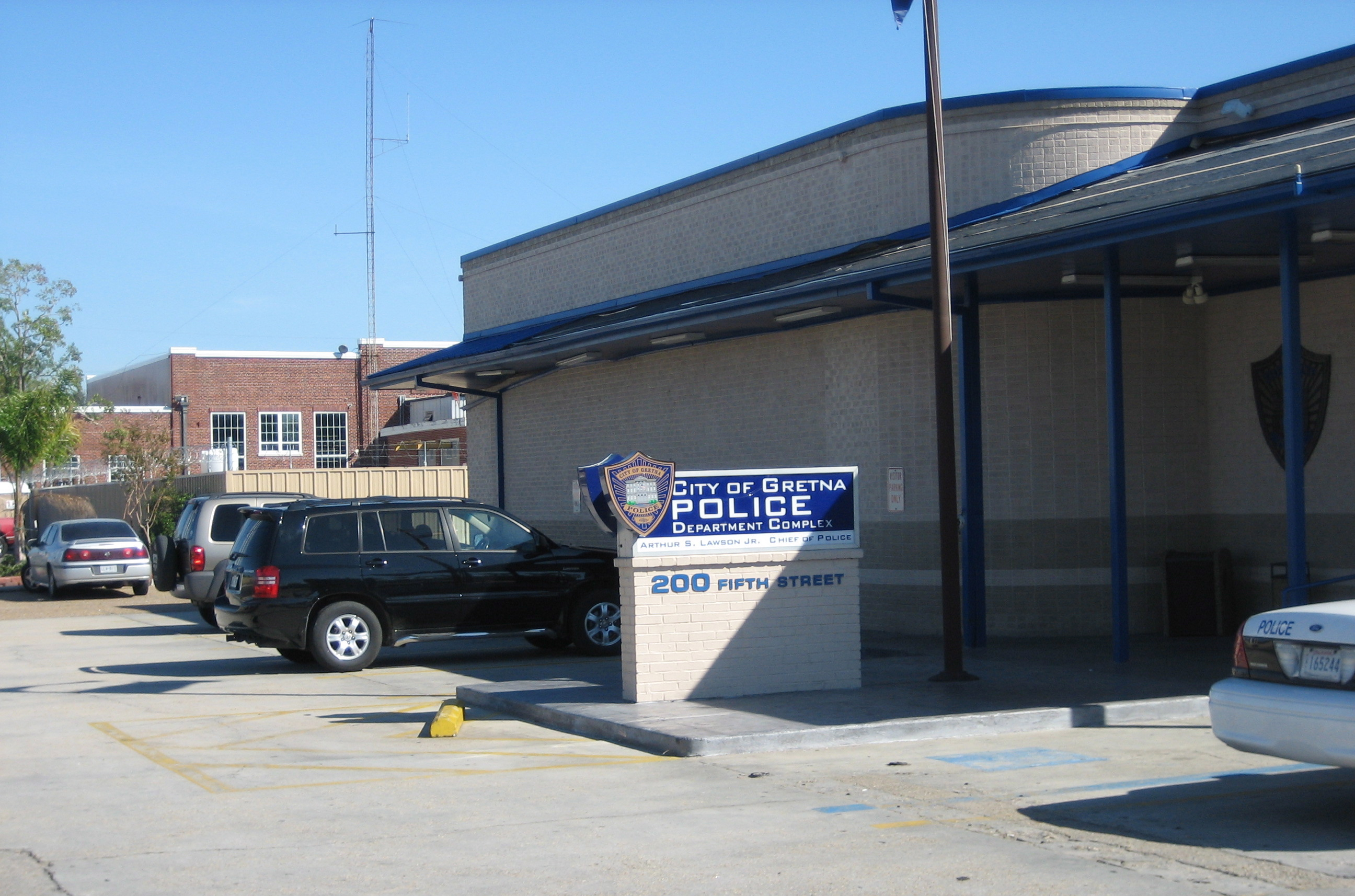
Gretna Police Department

The city has a police department that was established in 1913.

In 2016, press reports indicated that local police made 6,566 adult arrests in 2013, a rate about fourteen times that of a typical city. Such arrests may have generated over $5 million in fines and other revenue for the city. By July 2019, it was reported that two officers of the Gretna Police Department were fired for threatening United States Representative Alexandria Ocasio-Cortez. In 2024, Gretna was part of an investigation by ProPublica and WVUE-TV into fines and fees issued by municipalities in southeastern Louisiana, which found that Gretna had the highest number of violations per case as well as the highest average amount levied per case among the seven municipalities studied.

== Education ==
=== Primary and secondary schools ===
Gretna's public schools are operated by the Jefferson Parish Public Schools system.

Schools serving portions of the city limits are in the City of Gretna unless otherwise noted. Zoned elementary schools serving sections of Gretna include Shirley T. Johnson Gretna Park Elementary School, William Hart Elementary School, and McDonogh #26 Elementary School. George Cox Elementary School, which also serves a portion of Gretna, is in Timberlane, an unincorporated area of Jefferson Parish. Most residents are zoned to Marrero Middle School in Marrero, while some are zoned to Livaudais Middle School in Terrytown. Most residents are zoned to West Jefferson High School in Harvey, an unincorporated area of Jefferson Parish, while some are zoned to John Ehret High School. For advanced studies, residents are zoned to the Gretna Academy.

Gretna #2 Academy for Advanced Studies, a Pre-K to 5th grade magnet school, and L. W. Ruppel Academy, a Pre-K to 8th grade French immersion magnet school, are located in Gretna. Thomas Jefferson High School is another magnet school in Gretna.

Previously Gretna Middle School was in Gretna. It closed in 2023, with Thomas Jefferson High scheduled to move there for the following school year. Previously Kate Middleton Elementary in Terrytown served a portion of Gretna; it closed in 2012. Previously some residents were zoned to Helen Cox High School, also located in Harvey.

Milestone Sabis Academy, a K-8 charter school, is in Gretna; and Arden Cahill Academy is a private school in Gretna.

=== Public libraries ===
Jefferson Parish Library operates the Gretna Public Library in Gretna. The current facility, with more than 5,800 square feet (540 m^{2}) of space, opened on March 17, 2010. The library includes a 1,000-square-foot (93 m^{2}) meeting room that can accommodate 58 people. The library is almost twice the size of the previous 3,000-square-foot (280 m^{2}) facility.

== Culture ==
=== German American Cultural Center ===
The German American Cultural Center (GACC), headquartered at 519 Huey P. Long Avenue, was founded in 1988. It strives to interpret the contribution of German immigrants to Louisiana's history by presenting educational opportunities such as exhibits, lectures and other programs. GACC has sponsored special events such as Maifest and Oktoberfest. The latter is a 3-day event held during the first weekend of October each year (Note: However, the current GACC calendar shows that Gretna's Oktoberfest will start on October 10, 2020.) at the center.

=== Cultural References to Gretna, Louisiana ===
- In his 1957 novel, On the Road, author Jack Kerouac mentions Gretna.
- Portions of the movie A Love Song for Bobby Long were filmed in Gretna.
- Portions of Monster's Ball were filmed in Gretna.
- Portions of Homefront were filmed in Gretna.

== Notable people ==
- Joseph Cao (b. 1967), attorney and U.S. Representative for Louisiana's 2nd congressional district, 2009-2011
- Joe Clay (1938-2016), rockabilly musician
- Bianca Del Rio, drag queen
- Kiem Do, former captain and Deputy Chief of Staff (Operations) in the Republic of Vietnam Navy
- Olaf Fink (1914-1973), educator and state senator for Orleans Parish from 1956 to 1972.
- Frankie Ford (1939-2015), rock and roll performer
- John Fourcade (b. 1960), former New Orleans Saints quarterback was born in Gretna.
- Emmett Hardy (1903-1925), early jazz great
- Frederick Jacob Reagan Heebe (1922-2014), United States district court judge
- Eddie Lacy, former running back for the Green Bay Packers
- Lash LaRue (1917-1996), Western film actor
- John McDonogh (1799-1850), entrepreneur and philanthropist, established McDonoghville section of Gretna.
- Greg Monroe, NBA player
- Mel Ott (1909–1958), Baseball Hall of Fame member
- Stanley Joseph Ott (1927-1992), Roman Catholic bishop
- Elfrid Payton, Canadian Football League defensive lineman
- Elfrid Payton, Jr., professional basketball player
- Ike Taylor, Retired defensive back who played his entire career for the Pittsburgh Steelers
- Scott Williams, bassist for sludge metal band Soilent Green, died in 2004 in Gretna.

== See also ==
- Gretna Heritage Festival
