= Woodmere, Louisiana =

- Census-designated place
- Location within Louisiana
- Coordinates: 29°51′27″N 90°04′41″W
- Country: United States
- State: Louisiana
- Parish: Jefferson

Area
  - Total: 3.85 sq mi (9.96 km^{2})
  - Land: 3.65 sq mi (9.46 km^{2})
  - Water: 0.19 sq mi (0.50 km^{2})

Population (2020)
  - Total: 11,238
  - Density: 3,077.6/sq mi (1,188.26/km^{2})
- Time zone: UTC-6 (CST)
  - Summer (DST): UTC-5 (CDT)
- ZIP Code: 70058
- Area code: 504
- FIPS code: 22-83002
- GNIS feature ID: 1852438

Woodmere is an unincorporated community and census-designated place (CDP) in Jefferson Parish, Louisiana, United States. The population was 12,080 at the 2010 census, and 11,238 at the 2020 census. It is part of the New Orleans–Metairie–Kenner metropolitan statistical area.

== Geography ==
Woodmere is located on the east side of Jefferson Parish at 29°51′27″N 90°4′41″W (29.857588, -90.078051). It is bordered to the northeast by Harvey and to the southwest by Estelle. At its southeast corner it touches the community of Belle Chasse in Plaquemines Parish. The eastern border of Woodmere is the Harvey Canal. It is 6 miles (10 km) by air south of downtown New Orleans but 11 miles (18 km) by road.

According to the United States Census Bureau, the Woodmere CDP has a total area of 3.9 square miles (10.0 km^{2}), of which 3.7 square miles (9.5 km^{2}) are land and 0.2 square miles (0.5 km^{2}), or 5.03%, are water.

== Demographics ==
Historical population
Census	Pop.	Note	%±
2000	13,058		—
2010	12,080		−7.5%
2020	11,238		−7.0%
U.S. Decennial Census

Woodmere was first listed as a census designated place in the 2000 U.S. census.

Woodmere CDP, Louisiana – Racial and ethnic composition Note: the U.S. Census Bureau treats Hispanic/Latino as an ethnic category. This table excludes Latinos from the racial categories and assigns them to a separate category. Hispanics/Latinos may be of any race.
Race / Ethnicity (NH = Non-Hispanic)	Pop 2000	Pop 2010	Pop 2020	% 2000	% 2010	% 2020
White alone (NH)	2,899	1,081	697	22.20%	8.95%	6.20%
Black or African American alone (NH)	8,494	9,602	8,909	65.05%	79.49%	79.28%
Native American or Alaska Native alone (NH)	28	33	18	0.21%	0.27%	0.16%
Asian alone (NH)	781	504	407	5.98%	4.17%	3.62%
Native Hawaiian or Pacific Islander alone (NH)	0	1	3	0.00%	0.01%	0.03%
Other race alone (NH)	16	13	57	0.12%	0.11%	0.51%
Mixed race or Multiracial (NH)	142	143	283	1.09%	1.18%	2.52%
Hispanic or Latino (any race)	698	703	864	5.35%	5.82%	7.69%
Total	13,058	12,080	11,238	100.00%	100.00%	100.00%

According to the 2020 United States census, there were 11,238 people, 3,536 households, and 2,508 families residing in the CDP. In 2019, the American Community Survey estimated 10,173 people and 3,536 households lived in the CDP. The racial and ethnic makeup was 78.8% Black or African American, 10.7% non-Hispanic white, 0.2% American Indian and Alaska Native, 4.0% Asian, 0.9% some other race, 3.0% two or more races, and 10.7% Hispanic and Latino American of any race in 2019; and in 2020, its racial and ethnic makeup was 79.28% Black or African American, 6.2% non-Hispanic white, 0.16% American Indian and Alaska Native, 3.62% Asian, 0.03% Pacific Islander, 3.03% multiracial or of another race, and 7.69% Hispanic and Latino American of any race. In 2019, the median household income was $54,363 and 19.3% of the population lived at or below the poverty line.

== Education ==
Residents are assigned to schools in the Jefferson Parish Public Schools system.

For elementary school, much of Woodmere is zoned to: Woodmere K-8 School. Some portions are zoned to Congetta Trippe Janet K-8 in Estelle, and others are zoned to Ella C. Pittman Elementary in Marrero. For middle school, most residents are zoned to Woodmere K-8, while some are zoned to Janet K-8, and some are zoned to Marrero Middle School. All residents are zoned to John Ehret High School in Marrero.

In regards to advanced studies academies, residents are zoned to the Marrero Academy.

Previously Woodmere and Janet were elementary schools, and all residents were zoned to then-Truman Middle School in Estelle (now it is K-8). Previously some residents were zoned to Helen Cox High School in Harvey.
