= McDonoghville =

Human settlement in Orleans and Jefferson parishes, Louisiana

- Community
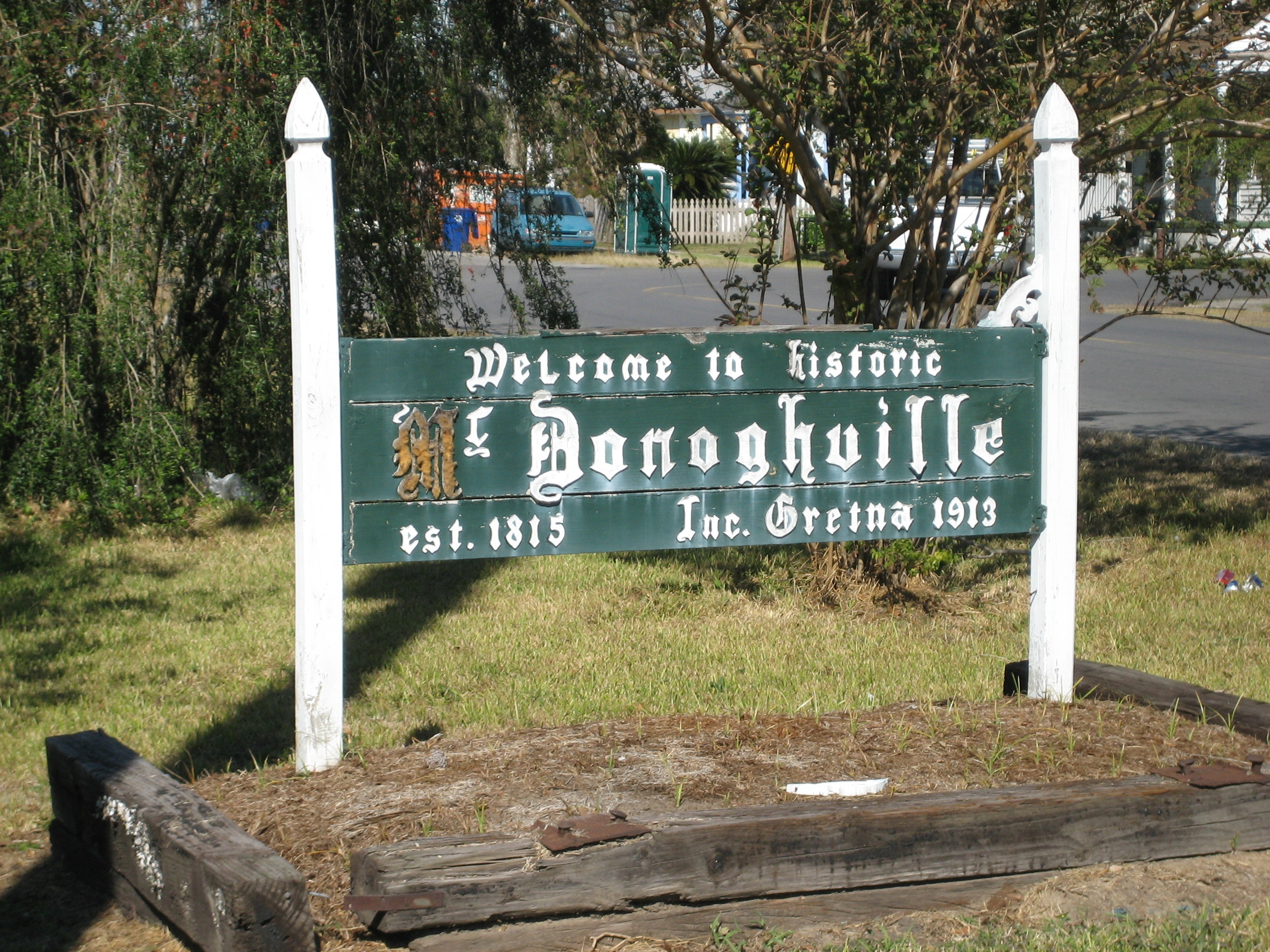
- Sign marking old McDonoghville boundary in Gretna
- Nickname: McDonogh
- Location within Louisiana McDonoghville (the United States)
- Country: United States
- State: Louisiana
- Parish: Orleans and Jefferson
- Established: 1815
- Founder: John McDonogh
- Time zone: UTC-6 (Central (CST))
  - Summer (DST): UTC-5 (CDT)

McDonoghville, sometimes called simply McDonogh, is a community of Algiers, New Orleans, and Gretna, Jefferson Parish, Louisiana.

== General presentation ==
McDonoghville straddles the West Bank boundary between Jefferson Parish and Orleans Parish. The portion on the Orleans side was absorbed into Algiers and then into New Orleans in 1870, while the portion on the Jefferson side was absorbed into Gretna in 1913. In 2020, Gretna began the process of nominating McDonoghville for listing on the National Register of Historic Places.

Like many Greater New Orleans neighborhoods, McDonoghville has its share of corner stores and a playground, named McDonogh, in the predominantly residential area. There are two small cemeteries, St. Bartholemew, founded in 1848, and St. Mary, founded in 1866, both maintained by the Church of the Holy Name of Mary. The church's parish was founded in 1848 and the church built in 1929. One of the largest commercial establishments in the community is Mardi Gras World, which designs and builds carnival floats for Mardi Gras along with massive fiberglass sculptures for businesses.

== History ==
Before McDonoghville was established in 1815, the area was home to the Montplaisir plantation built by Jean-Charles de Pradel in 1750. De Pradel had acquired the land in 1737 from Étienne Perier who'd received it as a grant from the Company of the Indies upon becoming governor of Louisiana in 1726. In 1813, philanthropist John McDonogh acquired the property and began subdividing the land to create McDonnoughville in 1815, the first subdivision in Jefferson Parish. McDonough leased and sold these properties to white laborers and free people of color, including people he'd previously held as slaves and hoped to prepare for returning to Liberia as part of the American Colonization Society migration project. For this reason, McDonoghville was also known informally as "Freetown".

By the 1880s, McDonoghville had become a center for railroads with a roundhouse, railyards, and multiple spur lines. Railroad magnate Jay Gould's holdings in the area were extensive enough for the area to be labeled "Gouldsboro" on an 1896 map. At the same time the area became a manufacturing hub and German immigrants settled in the town, followed in Irish and Italian immigrants in the late 19th and early 20th centuries. Reliable ferry service connecting the area with the East Bank facilitated the neighborhood's growth.
