= Harvey, Louisiana =

- Census-designated place
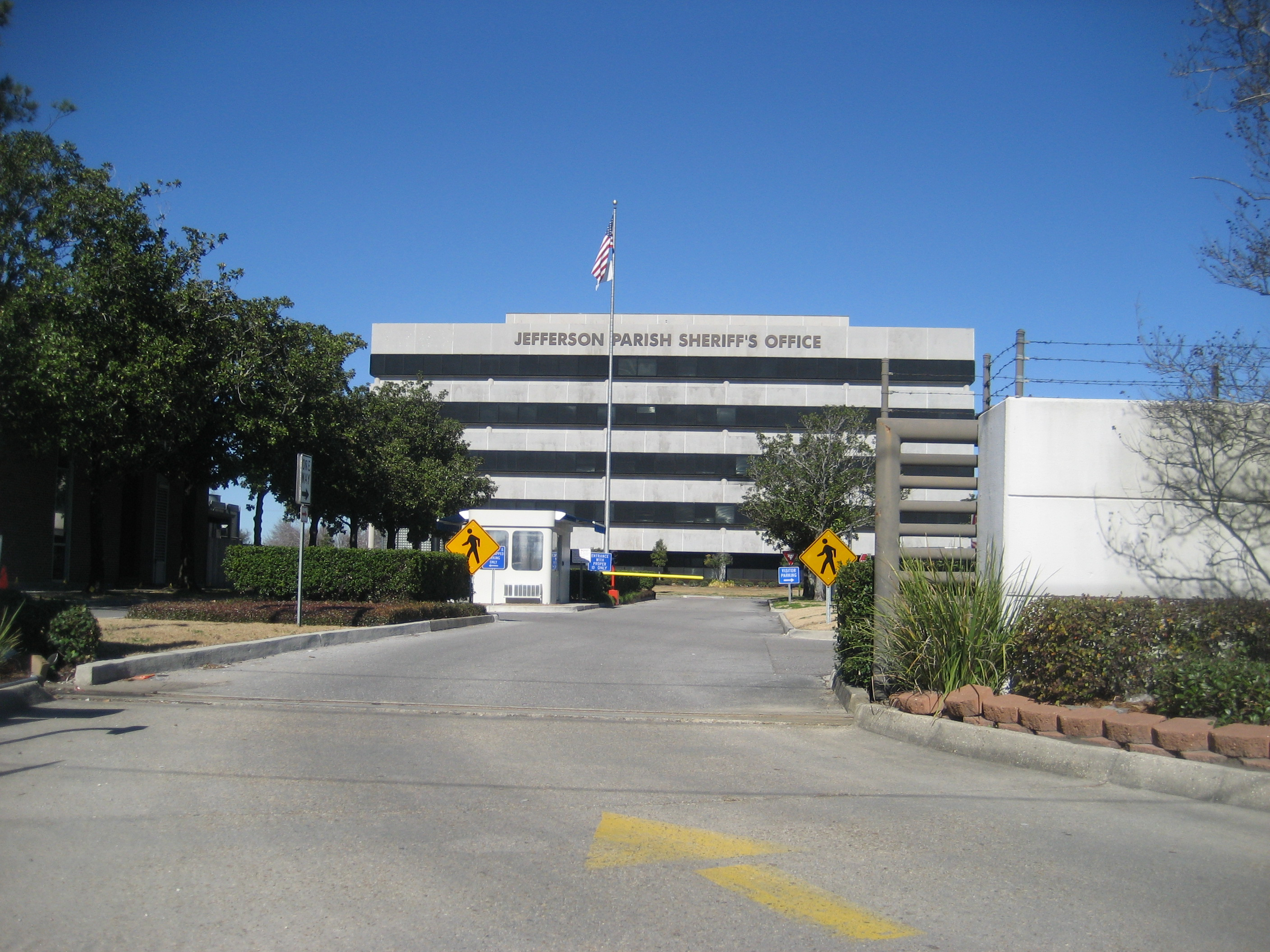
- Jefferson Parish Sheriff's Office in Harvey

- Location of Harvey in Louisiana
- Coordinates: 29°53′28″N 90°04′09″W
- Country: United States
- State: Louisiana
- Parish: Jefferson

Area
  - Total: 6.99 sq mi (18.10 km^{2})
  - Land: 6.49 sq mi (16.80 km^{2})
  - Water: 0.50 sq mi (1.30 km^{2})
- Elevation: 3 ft (0.91 m)

Population (2020)
  - Total: 22,236
  - Density: 3,428.0/sq mi (1,323.55/km^{2})
- Time zone: UTC-6 (CST)
  - Summer (DST): UTC-5 (CDT)
- ZIP Code: 70058
- Area code: 504
- FIPS code: 22-33245

Harvey is a census-designated place (CDP) in Jefferson Parish, Louisiana, United States. Harvey is on the south side (referred to as the "West Bank") of the Mississippi River, within the New Orleans–Metairie–Kenner metropolitan statistical area. The 2020 census determined that 22,236 people live in Harvey.

== History ==
During the French colonial era, the first owner of this land was Jean-Baptiste d'Estrehan de Beaupre, royal treasurer and comptroller for the French Louisiana colony. He established a plantation here. He used his slaves to dig the ditch that would become the Harvey Canal, cutting south from the banks of the Mississippi River to the back of Bayou Barataria, to provide better access.

Years later, d'Estrehan paid German settlers in the area to work on widening the ditch; they used wooden shovels. He paid them with small parcels of land located downriver in Mechanicsham, now the city of Gretna. D'Estrehan built his home where the ditch met the river banks, naming the settlement "Cosmopolite City".

Harvey was founded as a company town, developed by Joseph Hale Harvey (born March 7, 1816). During this time, Joseph Harvey would rename Cosmopolite City after his family surname. Harvey's wife, née Louise Destrehan, was a great-granddaughter of Jean Baptiste d'Estrehan. She was the daughter of Nicolas Noel d'Estrehan and granddaughter of Jean Noel Destréhan.

Harvey and Destrehan initiated construction of the canal locks leading to the Mississippi. Their son, Horace Harvey (c. 1860–1938), carried on the development of the canal and its surroundings.

== Geography ==
Location of Harvey, across the Mississippi from Uptown New Orleans, south-southwest of French Quarter

Harvey is located east of the Intracoastal Canal on the Mississippi River, at coordinates 29°53′28″N 90°04′09″W. It is bordered to the east by Gretna, to the west by Marrero, to the southwest by Woodmere, and to the north, across the Mississippi, by New Orleans. The closest highway crossing of the river is the Crescent City Connection 4 miles (6 km) northeast of Harvey.

According to the United States Census Bureau, the Harvey CDP has a total area of 7.1 square miles (18.3 km^{2}), of which 6.6 sq mi (17.0 km^{2}) are land and 0.5 sq mi (1.3 km^{2}), or 7.16%, are water.

== Demographics ==
Historical population
Census	Pop.	Note	%±
1970	6,347		—
1980	22,709		257.8%
1990	21,222		−6.5%
2000	22,226		4.7%
2010	20,348		−8.4%
2020	22,236		9.3%
U.S. Decennial Census; 1960 1970 1980; 1990 2000 2010 2020

Harvey first appeared as an unincorporated community in the 1970 U.S. census; and as a census designated place in the 1980 United States census.

Harvey CDP, Louisiana – Racial and ethnic composition Note: the U.S. Census Bureau treats Hispanic/Latino as an ethnic category. This table excludes Latinos from the racial categories and assigns them to a separate category. Hispanics/Latinos may be of any race.
Race / Ethnicity (NH = Non-Hispanic)	Pop 2000	Pop 2010	Pop 2020	% 2000	% 2010	% 2020
White alone (NH)	10,075	7,659	6,489	45.33%	37.64%	29.18%
Black or African American alone (NH)	9,370	8,201	9,705	42.16%	40.30%	43.65%
Native American or Alaska Native alone (NH)	94	64	64	0.42%	0.31%	0.29%
Asian alone (NH)	1,156	1,362	1,451	5.20%	6.69%	6.53%
Native Hawaiian or Pacific Islander alone (NH)	5	10	6	0.02%	0.05%	0.03%
Other race alone (NH)	49	31	116	0.22%	0.15%	0.52%
Mixed race or Multiracial (NH)	291	289	688	1.31%	1.42%	3.09%
Hispanic or Latino (any race)	1,186	2,732	3,717	5.34%	13.43%	16.72%
Total	22,226	20,348	22,236	100.00%	100.00%	100.00%

According to the 2020 United States census, there were 22,236 people, 8,119 households, and 4,756 families residing in the CDP. At the 2019 American Community Survey, there were 21,054 people living in the CDP. According to the census of 2010, there were 20,348 people, 7,544 households, and 5,160 families residing in the CDP.

In 2020, the racial and ethnic makeup of Harvey was 43.65% Black or African American, 29.18% non-Hispanic white, 0.29% Native American, 6.53% Asian, 0.03% Pacific Islander, 3.62% two or more races, and 16.72% Hispanic and Latino American of any race. The racial and ethnic makeup was 34.2% non-Hispanic white, 51.6% African American, 0.2% Native American, 4.9% Asian, 4.1% some other race, 1.3% two or more races, and 9.5% Hispanic or Latino American of any race in 2019. In 2010, the racial makeup of the CDP was 43.5% White, 41.1% African American, 0.4% Native American, 6.8% Asian, 0.1% Pacific Islander, 5.6% some other race, and 2.5% from two or more races. Hispanic or Latino of any race were 13.4% of the population. From 2010 to 2020, the population and diversification of the CDP has reflected state and nationwide demographic trends of African American, Asian, and Hispanic and Latino growth.

For the period 2012–2016, the median annual income for a household in the CDP was $37,058, and the median income for a family was $52,173. Male full-time workers had a median income of $40,205 versus $32,500 for females. The per capita income for the CDP was $22,344. About 17.4% of families and 21.5% of the population were below the poverty line, including 29.4% of those under age 18 and 19.4% of those age 65 or over. By 2019, the median household income was $41,559 and 16.6% of the population lived at or below the poverty line.

== Government and infrastructure ==
The Louisiana Office of Juvenile Justice operates the New Orleans Metro Office in Harvey.

The United States Postal Service operates the Harvey Post Office.

== Education ==
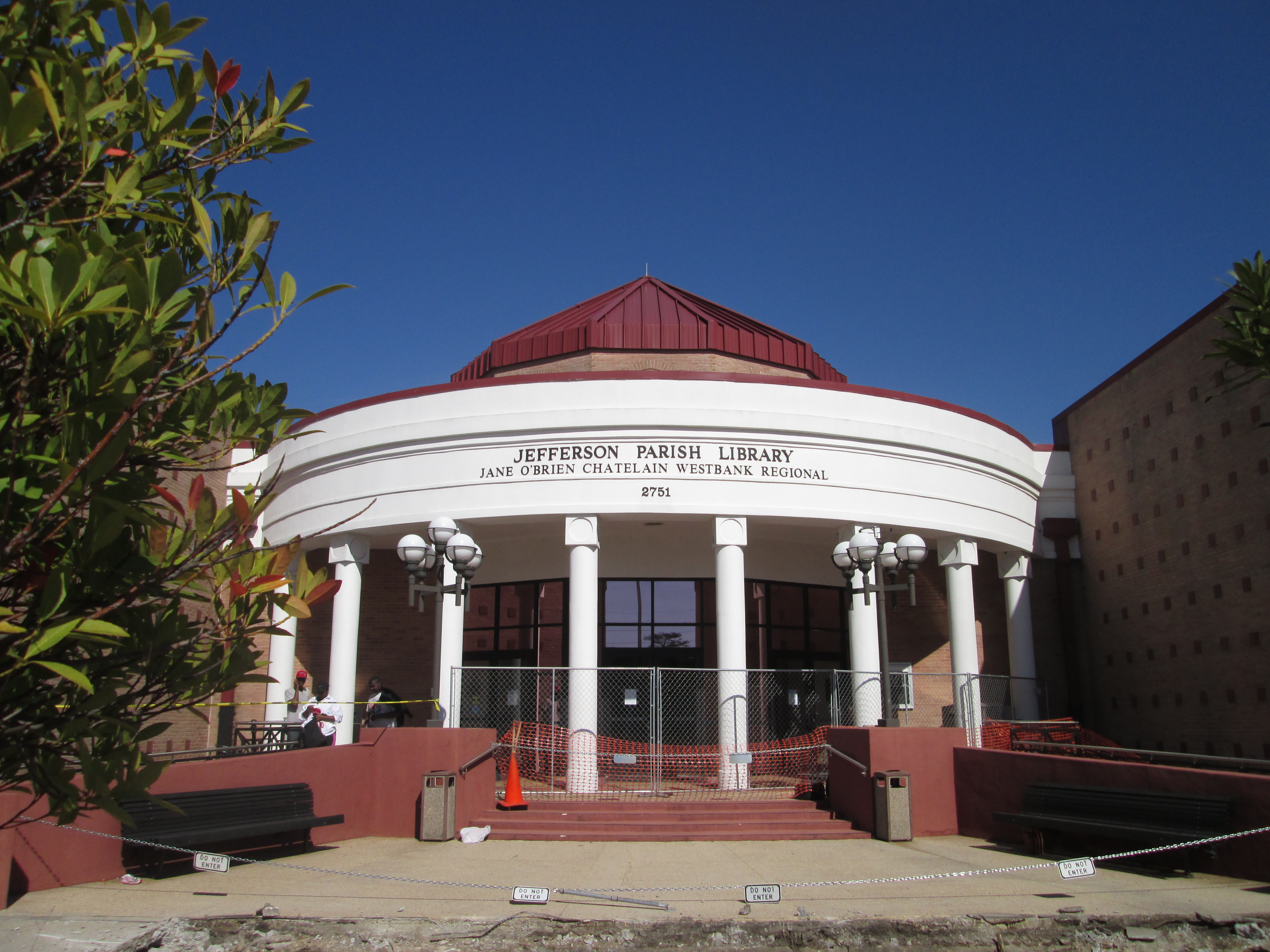
Jane O'Brein Chatelein Westbank Regional Library

Harvey is within the Jefferson Parish Public School System, which has its headquarters in Harvey.

West Jefferson High School is the sole zoned public high school in the Harvey CDP. A portion of Harvey in the south is zoned to John Ehret High School, and a portion to the northwest is zoned to L. W. Higgins High School.

Some residents are zoned to Gretna Middle School in Gretna, and some are zoned to Marrero Middle School in Marrero.

Woodland West Elementary School is in Harvey. Ella C. Pittman Elementary School is in Marrero, adjacent to Harvey and serving portions of Harvey. Other schools outside of Harvey serving portions: Gretna Park and McDonogh #26 in Gretna, Cox Elementary in Timberlane, Collins Elementary (formerly Ames) in Marrero. Woodmere Elementary in Woodmere is nearby, but its attendance zone does not cover the Harvey CDP.

Public kindergartens:

- Harvey Kindergarten Center

In regards to advanced studies academies, residents are zoned to the Gretna Academy.

Helen Cox High School was in Harvey until 2023. Previously Homedale Elementary in Harvey served portions of the city. In 2012 Homedale Elementary closed. A plan called for Homedale students to be rezoned to McDonogh 26 Elementary in Gretna.

Private schools

- St. Ville Academy for High School Preparation
- Homedale School
- St Rosalie Elementary School

Jefferson Parish Library operates the Jane O'Brien Chatelain West Bank Regional Library in Harvey. The 35,000-square-foot (3,300 m^{2}) facility opened in 1990 and is the largest public library in the West Bank of Jefferson Parish.

== Notable people ==
- Zaila Avant-garde, winner of the 2021 Scripps National Spelling Bee
- Ja'Marr Chase, wide receiver in the NFL. Currently playing for the Cincinnati Bengals.
- Patrick Connick, the District 84 Republican state representative resides in Harvey.
- Fats Domino, rock and roll singer and pianist
- Joseph N. Jackson, inventor of programmable TV remote
- Patrick O'Neal Kennedy (plaintiff in Kennedy v. Louisiana)
- Greg Monroe, NBA player
- Laremy Tunsil, NFL player, currently playing for the Washington Commanders.
