= Revius Ortique Jr. =

American judge (1924–2008)

- Born: June 14, 1924
- Died: June 22, 2008 (aged 84); Baton Rouge, Louisiana
- Education: B.A., Dillard University (1947); M.A., Indiana University (1949); J.D., Southern University Law School (1956)
- Occupations: Judge; Civil rights activist

Revius Oliver Ortique Jr. (June 14, 1924 – June 22, 2008) was an American jurist, the first African-American justice of the Louisiana Supreme Court, and civil rights activist.

Born in New Orleans, Louisiana, he served as an officer in the United States Army during World War II, and later graduated from Dillard University, majoring in sociology. During the Civil Rights Era, he contributed to the McDonogh Day Boycott in New Orleans by publicizing the boycott of the segregated public ceremony on his radio show. He was a judge of the Orleans Parish Civil District Court from 1978 to 1992, serving as Chief Judge of that district from 1986 onward. In 1992, Revius Ortique was the first African-American elected to the Louisiana Supreme Court. He died in Baton Rouge, Louisiana.

== See also ==
- List of African-American jurists
