= Vincent Cox III =

American politician

Member of the Louisiana House of Representatives from the 85th district
- Incumbent
- Assumed office January 8, 2024
- Preceded by: Joe Marino

Personal details
- Party: Republican
- Education: Archbishop Shaw High School
- Occupation: Retired, AT&T, Network Technical Specialist

Vincent E. Cox III is an American politician serving as a member of the Louisiana House of Representatives from the 85th district. A member of the Republican Party, Cox represents parts of Jefferson Parish and has been in office since January 8, 2024.
