= Woodmere, Montgomery, Alabama =

Coordinates: 32°21′14″N 86°12′07″W

Woodmere, since 1976, is a developed neighborhood subdivision located six miles east of downtown Montgomery, Alabama. As of 2006 the medium density area includes a variety of nearly 800 homes. Adjacent apartment complexes are outside the neighborhood.

== History ==
According to an initial marketing brochure, Woodmere was designed for Ballard Development Company by one of America's foremost community planning organizations. "It is located just off the Eastern Bypass at Interstate 85, providing easy access to all Montgomery," stated the brochure distributed by Ballard in 1976. "In addition to traditional home sites, Woodmere offers 'patio homes' and townhouses, both of which provide greater privacy and the opportunity for simple gardening and outdoor entertaining."

== Geography ==
Former wetlands, gently rolling terrain at an elevation 260 – 285 feet above sea level; it has no permanent streams, and three ponds with extensive park area.

== Notable points ==
- Alabama Shakespeare Festival
- Blount Cultural Park
- Montgomery Museum of Fine Arts
