= Timberlane, Louisiana =

Timberlane
- Census-designated place
- Location of Timberlane in Louisiana
- Coordinates: 29°52′49″N 90°01′46″W
- Country: United States
- State: Louisiana
- Parish: Jefferson

Area
  - Total: 1.50 sq mi (3.89 km^{2})
  - Land: 1.50 sq mi (3.89 km^{2})
  - Water: 0 sq mi (0.00 km^{2})

Population (2020)
  - Total: 10,364
  - Density: 6,893.0/sq mi (2,661.42/km^{2})
- Time zone: UTC-6 (CST)
  - Summer (DST): UTC-5 (CDT)
- ZIP code: 70056
- Area code: 504
- FIPS code: 22-75740

Timberlane is a census-designated place (CDP) in Jefferson Parish, Louisiana, United States. The population was 10,364 in 2020. It is part of the New Orleans–Metairie–Kenner metropolitan statistical area.

== Geography ==
Timberlane is located at 29°52′49″N 90°1′46″W (29.880140, -90.029523). According to the United States Census Bureau, the CDP has a total area of 1.5 square miles (3.9 km^{2}), all land.

== Demographics ==
Historical population
Census	Pop.	Note	%±
1980	11,579		—
1990	12,614		8.9%
2000	11,405		−9.6%
2010	10,243		−10.2%
2020	10,364		1.2%
U.S. Decennial Census; 1950 1960 1970 1980; 1990 2000 2010

Timberlane first appeared as a census designated place in the 1990 U.S. census.

Timberlane CDP, Louisiana – Racial and ethnic composition Note: the U.S. Census Bureau treats Hispanic/Latino as an ethnic category. This table excludes Latinos from the racial categories and assigns them to a separate category. Hispanics/Latinos may be of any race.
Race / Ethnicity (NH = Non-Hispanic)	Pop 2000	Pop 2010	Pop 2020	% 2000	% 2010	% 2020
White alone (NH)	7,074	4,656	3,888	62.03%	45.46%	37.51%
Black or African American alone (NH)	2,655	3,551	3,651	23.28%	34.67%	35.23%
Native American or Alaska Native alone (NH)	81	40	16	0.71%	0.39%	0.15%
Asian alone (NH)	517	581	765	4.53%	5.67%	7.38%
Native Hawaiian or Pacific Islander alone (NH)	4	3	0	0.04%	0.03%	0.00%
Other race alone (NH)	25	26	102	0.22%	0.25%	0.98%
Mixed race or Multiracial (NH)	173	201	478	1.52%	1.96%	4.61%
Hispanic or Latino (any race)	876	1,185	1,464	7.68%	11.57%	14.13%
Total	11,405	10,243	10,364	100.00%	100.00%	100.00%

The 2019 American Community Survey estimated 9,950 people lived in the CDP, down from 10,243 at the 2010 U.S. census. At the 2020 U.S. census, the population rebounded to 10,364. In 2019, the racial and ethnic makeup was 37.4% non-Hispanic white, 40.9% Black or African American, 0.1% Native American, 7.2% Asian, 4.5% some other race, 3.5% two or more races, and 10.6% Hispanic and Latino American of any race. By 2020, its racial and ethnic makeup was a tabulated 37.51% non-Hispanic white, 35.23% Black or African American, 0.15% Native American, 7.38% Asian, 5.6% two or more races, and 14.13% Hispanic and Latino American of any race. The median household income was $54,702 and 8.6% lived at or below the poverty line in 2019.

== Education ==
Residents are assigned to schools in the Jefferson Parish Public Schools system.

Schools that serve Timberlane for elementary school are: Cox and Solis. Schools that serve Timberlane for middle school are Gretna Middle and Livaudais. Portions of Timberlane are within the zones of John Ehret High School and West Jefferson High School. In regards to advanced studies academies, residents are zoned to the Gretna Academy.

Previously a part of Timberlane was zoned to Helen Cox High School.
