= Muscle Beach (disambiguation) =

Muscle Beach is a beach in Santa Monica, California.

Muscle Beach may also refer to:

- Muscle Beach (novel), a 1959 novel by Ira Wallach
- Muscle Beach (film), a 1948 film directed by Joseph Strick and Irving Lerner

== See also ==
- Muscle Beach Party, a 1964 film directed by William Asher
- The Hustler of Muscle Beach, a 1980 film directed by Jonathan Kaplan
