= Steve Mills =

Steve Mills may refer to:

- Steve Mills (footballer) (1953–1988), English footballer with Southampton
- Steve Mills (juggler) (1957–2023), American juggler and unicyclist
- Steve Mills (rugby union) (born 1951), English international rugby union player
- Steve Mills (Shortland Street), a fictional character on the New Zealand soap opera Shortland Street
- Steve Mills (sports executive) (born 1959), American sports executive
- Steve Mills (vaudeville) (1895–1988), American vaudeville comedian

== See also ==
- Stephen Mills (born 1960), American artistic director of Ballet Austin
- Stephen Mills (public servant) (1857–1948), Australian public servant
- Stephen Mills (journalist), (born 1952), British wildlife journalist
- Stephanie Mills (disambiguation)
