= Mildred Freed Alberg =

American producer (1921–2002)

Mildred Freed Alberg (January 15, 1921 - 2002) was an American producer who worked primarily in television, including creating the Hallmark Hall of Fame. Described by actor Maurice Evans as "television's pathfinder", she received two Peabody Awards, seven Sylvania Awards, six Christopher Awards, and five Emmy Awards, in addition to other professional recognition.

== Early years ==
Alberg was born in Montreal, Canada, on January 15, 1921, the daughter of Harry and Florence Freed. Her father founded the Freed Paper Box Company in Montreal. She was the third child of the couple's three daughters and one son. Her father and one sister died in 1931, after which her brother assumed responsibility for the family. A self-described "voracious reader", she moved to New York City in 1939 because Montreal's libraries did not have enough resources for English-speaking people. The day after her arrival a newspaper ad led to her being hired as a typist for two ghostwriters for George Abbott. She went beyond typing to discuss with them her thoughts about the material that she typed, essentially becoming another ghostwriter. After Alberg had been in that job about one year, her two employers moved to California, and they found a job for Alberg that had her typing novels for a publisher in New York. She supplemented her work and personal reading with evening courses, some at theater school and some at The New School for Social Research. Her interests gradually focused on classes related to theatrical arts, and she developed an interest in writing scripts and producing for radio.

== Career ==
Alberg was a ghostwriter for Floyd Gibbons. She ventured into broadcasting in the early 1940s as producer of a series of debates that initially presented only a conservative perspective. After she asked, "Don't you think you should have two sides if you call it a 'debate'?" she was asked to participate in the next broadcast. During World War II she wrote dramatizations and public service announcements for radio. After the war she began working for the international humanitarian relief agency CARE, and in 1947 she was promoted to be that organization's director of information. She stayed with CARE until 1951, and her responsibilities expanded to include producing dramatizations based on case histories of CARE's operations. The shows were broadcast on ABC Radio. In 1953, Alberg's production company, Milberg Engerprises, Incorporated, was founded. She was its president.

=== Hallmark Hall of Fame ===
When Alberg watched a television presentation of Julius Caesar in the early 1950s, she became irritated by the way William Shakespeare's play had been cut to fit into a one-hour broadcast. She was one of the first people to convince leaders of a major TV network that people would watch dramas longer than 60 minutes She and NBC then broke new ground in TV in 1953 with Maurice Evans starring in a two-hour production of Hamlet. Her husband, Somer Alberg, had introduced her to Evans, who agreed to do that play on TV provided that it would not be limited to an hour. His agreement provided the impetus for her to tell NBC executives, "You bleed your plays to death. You don't give them a chance." With two hours, she promised, "I can get you the greatest play in the English language with one of the best actors in the English-speaking world." As producer of the program, Alberg initiated the play, suggested casting, and assigned people to work on costumes, makeup, and sets. She was liaison among the advertising agency, the network, and the sponsor. She helped the director get each production under way, then stayed away until final rehearsals. The April 26, 1953, presentation of Hamlet was "an unqualified success", with more people watching the play that night than had seen all of its theatrical productions combined.

A review in Time in 1958 said:

Back in 1952 Hallmark was a series of half-hour plays of vaguely inspirational intent presided over by Sarah Churchill. Hallmark’s Executive Producer Mildred Freed Alberg, then only a freelance TV scriptwriter, persuaded Actor Evans to try his famed Hamlet on TV, sat down and wrote an impressive two-hour adaptation of the play. She persuaded Hallmark Cards’ canny President Joyce C. Hall to back her. In those days, two hours of Shakespeare was a heady gamble, but Evans’ Hamlet was a whacking success, and Hallmark was credited with breaking TV’s time barrier. Since then, Hall of Fame has put on some of TV’s best dramatic shows ... Mrs. Alberg’s credo: “Other shows try to make popular things good. We try to make good things popular.” They have.

Hallmark and NBC agreed on a series of other Shakespearean plays starring Evans. Those productions included Macbeth and Richard III in 1954. The next year, "The Hallmark Hall of Fame became a long-term, regular feature on NBC" with Alberg its executive producer. Evans returned to star in The Taming of the Shrew and Dial M for Murder. Other productions in the series included Ah, Wilderness!, Alice in Wonderland, Born Yesterday, The Green Pastures, Hans Brinker or the Silver Skates, The Lark, The Little Foxes, Man and Superman, and There Shall Be No Night. The Ah, Wilderness! episode was the first 90-minute TV production of a play by Eugene O'Neill.

=== Our American Heritage ===
The next phase in Alberg's career resulted from a request to replace an ailing producer. Fred Coe had been scheduled to launch Our American Heritage, a series of specials to dramatize "crucial, representative events in the lives of famous Americans". An agent asked her to meet with representatives of The Equitable Life Assurance Society and editors of American Heritage magazine. Her Canadian background initially made her hesitant to commit to the project, but after she read in-depth about leaders in American history, she said, "I loved it", and she agreed to be the producer. The series premiered with "Divided We Stand", an episode about Thomas Jefferson, on October 18, 1959. Alberg produced approximately 15 hour-long episodes by the time the series ended in 1961. Other subjects of episodes included Andrew Carnegie, Ulysses S. Grant, Eli Whitney, and John Charles Fremont. Alberg said that her responsibilities on Our American Heritage made her work on Hallmark Hall of Fame "seem like a Sunday School picnic". She explained that the new program used original scripts rather than established works, and those scripts had to be "entertaining ... enlightening ... and they must be absolutely historically authentic". Editors at American Heritage collaborated with the TV staff to verify the autheticity of productions.

=== Other TV ===
Alberg produced the Biblical drama "The Story of Jacob and Joseph", which was broadcast on ABC in 1974. The two-hour episode was filmed in the Middle East with "a careful eye for historical accuracy". She followed that production with "The Story of David" in 1976. In 1980 Alberg contacted the Public Broadcasting Service about making her first documentary. Working in Syria, she produced "The Royal Archives of Ebla". The film was first shown at the Smithsonian Institution, and PBS broadcast it in October 1980. It received a gold medal for being the best TV documentary at the International Film and TV Festival in New York City.

=== Alberg's perspective on TV programming ===
Newsday published an opinion piece by Alberg in August 1957 in which she made a case for broadcasting programs such as Hallmark Hall of Fame. She pointed out that sponsor Hallmark "feels that if we choose good plays, and do them well, we can attract and hold a good audience. Thus we select the very best plays we can find. We produce them as if each one were destined for Broadway." She wrote that viewer support would encourage more sponsors to provide quality programs: "Letters, patience, encouragement will guarantee that the good shows will not only continue, but multiply." She noted that a number of viewers wrote supportive messages after each Hall of Fame broadcast, and as a result "we even have a sense of audience participation." Alberg also wrote that viewers might want to change their practices with regard to watching TV. For example, rather than watching the same shows habitually, checking each day's TV listings might make them aware of new programs that they might enjoy more. She also noted that viewers sometimes failed to appreciate a good program because they tuned in "15 minutes after it had begun, stayed with it 10 minutes and turned it off".

=== Stage and film ===
Alberg produced Little Moon of Alban on Broadway in 1960. The play had been done on Hallmark Hall of Fame in 1958, and producing it on stage frustrated Alberg because "things I could do in television I couldn't do in the theater". Five years later she turned to film, persuading MGM to finance her project. Hot Millions premiered in 1968. Although Alberg enjoyed the experience, her creative control was restricted by the number of people involved as investors and bosses, a byproduct of the amount of money involved. As producer, she signed Peter Ustinov to star in the film, and he and Ira Wallach wrote the script. Completed 10 percent under budget in 10 weeks, it grossed $210,000 in its first week in theaters.

== Personal life ==
Mildred Freed married Somer Alberg on January 28, 1940, in Montreal, Canada. He was an actor from Montreal whom she met in New York City. The marriage ended with Somer's death on May 31, 1977. After retiring from TV production, she moved to Florida in 1984 and became an artist, working in oil paint. She died in 2002.

== Recognition ==
Hallmark Hall of Fame received 17 awards in the 1957-1958 season, including Peabody, Sylvania, and an Emmy. Our American Heritage received an Emmy Award and was named the "Most outstanding educational program of 1959".

== Papers ==
Alberg's papers are housed at the University of Wisconsin-Madison.
