= Don't Make Waves =

1967 film by Alexander Mackendrick

- original movie poster
- Directed by: Alexander Mackendrick
- Screenplay by: Ira Wallach; George Kirgo; Terry Southern; Maurice Richlin (adaptation)
- Based on: Muscle Beach; 1959 novel by Ira Wallach
- Produced by: John Calley; Martin Ransohoff
- Starring: Tony Curtis; Claudia Cardinale; Sharon Tate; Robert Webber; Joanna Barnes; Dave Draper
- Cinematography: Philip H. Lathrop
- Edited by: Rita Roland; Thomas Stanford
- Music by: Vic Mizzy
- Production companies: Filmways; Reynard Productions
- Distributed by: Metro-Goldwyn-Mayer
- Release date: June 9, 1967
- Running time: 97 minutes
- Country: United States
- Language: English
- Box office: $1.25 million (US/ Canada)

Don't Make Waves is a 1967 American sex comedy (with elements of the beach party genre) starring Tony Curtis, Claudia Cardinale, Dave Draper and Sharon Tate. Distributed by Metro-Goldwyn-Mayer, the film was directed by Alexander Mackendrick and is based on the 1959 novel Muscle Beach by Ira Wallach, who also co-wrote the screenplay.

The film depicts a series of romantic triangles between different groupings of the principal cast and supporting players among several backdrops involving Southern California culture (swimming pools, bodybuilding, beach life, fantastic real estate, mudslides, metaphysical gurus, etc.).

== Plot ==
Carlo Cofield, a tourist visiting California's west coast, has not even arranged lodging, when his car is smashed by a reckless driver. She is a carefree, attractive Italian artist named Laura Califatti, who offers her couch for Carlo to sleep on that night.

This arrangement displeases Rod Prescott, a wealthy swimming-pool builder, because Laura is his mistress. After being kicked out of Laura's, Carlo tries to sleep on the beach and nearly drowns. He wakes to find a gorgeous surfer rescuing him by covering his nostrils with her cheek to administer two breaths. She goes by the name Malibu, and Carlo begins to romantically pursue her.

After renting a house near the ocean, Carlo cons a sweet but naïve bodybuilder Harry, Malibu's boyfriend, into believing that having sex is harmful to his body. He also bribes Madame Lavinia, a phony psychic, who is actually a man, to discourage Harry from dating Malibu.

Rod decides to give the persistent Carlo a job as a pool salesman. The affair with Laura is discovered by Rod's wife Diane, who demands a divorce. As a quarrel develops with everyone present, a mudslide caused by a sudden storm makes Carlo's house slide down a cliff. By the time everyone is saved, they pair off with the romantic partners they care about most.

== Cast ==
Actors	Characters	info
Tony Curtis	Carlo Cofield	
Claudia Cardinale	Laura Califatti	
Sharon Tate	Malibu	
David Draper	Harry Hollard	
Joanna Barnes	Diane Prescott	
Robert Webber	Rod Prescott	
Reg Lewis	Monster	
Mort Sahl	Sam Lingonberry	
Edgar Bergen	Madame Lavinia	
Dub Taylor	Electrician	
Mary Grace Canfield	Seamstress	
Holly Haze	Myrna	
Sarah Selby	Ethyl	
Julie Payne	Helen	
Douglas Henderson	Henderson	
Chester Yorton	Ted Gunder	
Ann Elder	Millie Gunder	
Marc London	Fred Barker	
Paul Barselou	Pilot	as Paul Barselow
George Tyne	Newspaperman	
David Fresco	Newspaperman	
Gilbert Green	Newspaperman	as Gil Green
Eduardo Tirello	Decorator	
Jim Backus	Himself	uncredited
Henny Backus	Herself	uncredited
China Lee	Topless swimmer	uncredited
Joanne Hashimoto	Female Gymnast	uncredited
Bill Kennedy	Reporter	uncredited

== Production notes ==
The film was based on Ira Wallach's novel Muscle Beach, published in 1959.

In August 1963, it was announced film rights had been purchased by Martin Ransohoff of Filmways, who had a deal with MGM. Ransohoff and Wallach had collaborated on The Wheeler Dealers. Wallach would do the screenplay and the film would be part of an $18 million slate, coming out in June 1964. Filming was delayed.

Curtis' casting was announced in April 1966. In June it was announced Alexander Mackendrick would direct and Claudia Cardinale would co star. Filming took place in August 1966. It was made as a co-production with Curtis' film production company, Reynard Productions.

Sharon Tate told her husband Roman Polanski that her experience working on this film was not particularly enjoyable. The production atmosphere was tense, and it worsened when an uncredited stuntman drowned when he parachuted into the Pacific Ocean. The film was Tate's third to be produced, but as it was the first to be released in cinemas, it is generally considered to be her debut. MGM mounted an extensive publicity campaign upon its release that was based largely on Tate and her character, Malibu, and life-sized cardboard cutouts of Tate wearing a bikini were placed in cinema foyers throughout the United States. It was also linked to a widespread advertising campaign by Coppertone which featured Tate.

Dave Draper, who plays Malibu's boyfriend Harry, was the 1965 IFBB Mr. America and the 1966 NABBA Mr. Universe.

1966 NABBA Mr. Universe bodybuilder Chester Yorton, who plays Ted Gunder, made one other film, 1964's Muscle Beach Party, in which he plays the character called Hulk.

The aerial parachuting sequences were photographed by freefall cinematographer Bob Buquor. During filming, Buquor lost control of his parachute and landed in the Pacific Ocean off Malibu, California and drowned.

=== Music ===
The score was composed by Vic Mizzy. Roger McGuinn and Chris Hillman wrote the title song "Don't Make Waves," performed by the Byrds over the opening credits.

== Critical reception ==
Upon its release on June 20, 1967, Don't Make Waves received generally mixed reviews. By the time the film was released, the popularity of beach films and films that related to California beach culture had begun to wane as had the popularity of Tony Curtis as a matinee idol. Film critic Andrew Sarris' contemporary review in The Village Voice reported that the film was "one of the more underrated comedies of the season," but added "[the film] is the latest of what promises to be a long line of frightening documentaries on the state of California" and "the biggest liability, however, is Claudia Cardinale, who should never act in English." Dave Kehr wrote in Chicago Reader that the film had a "remarkable tone" of "sharp but warmhearted social satire." Writing for Turner Classic Movies, critic Jeff Stafford described the film as "often surprisingly funny and full of incidental pleasures [...] Curtis is perfectly cast as the shyster pool salesman," and "the sight gags are also occasionally inspired." Don't Make Waves also received a positive review from film critic Leonard Maltin, who described it as "a gem", and noted the "good direction, funny performance by Sharon Tate and a catchy title song...".

Filmink argued "As a film, it’s a mess, although there’s always something happening and it is bright and silly. You can see why it didn’t make money, but you can also see why it was always on TV."

In American Prince, his 2009 autobiography, Tony Curtis wrote of making Don't Make Waves, "The plot was utterly ridiculous, but I agreed to appear in the film because I got a percentage of the gross." The film went on to earn $1.25 million at the box office.

== Home media ==
Don't Make Waves was released to DVD by Warner Home Video's Warner Archive on June 27, 2011, as a burn-on-demand Region 1 widescreen DVD.

== See also ==
- List of American films of 1967
