= Donald Ray Jones Sr. =

American former local elected official

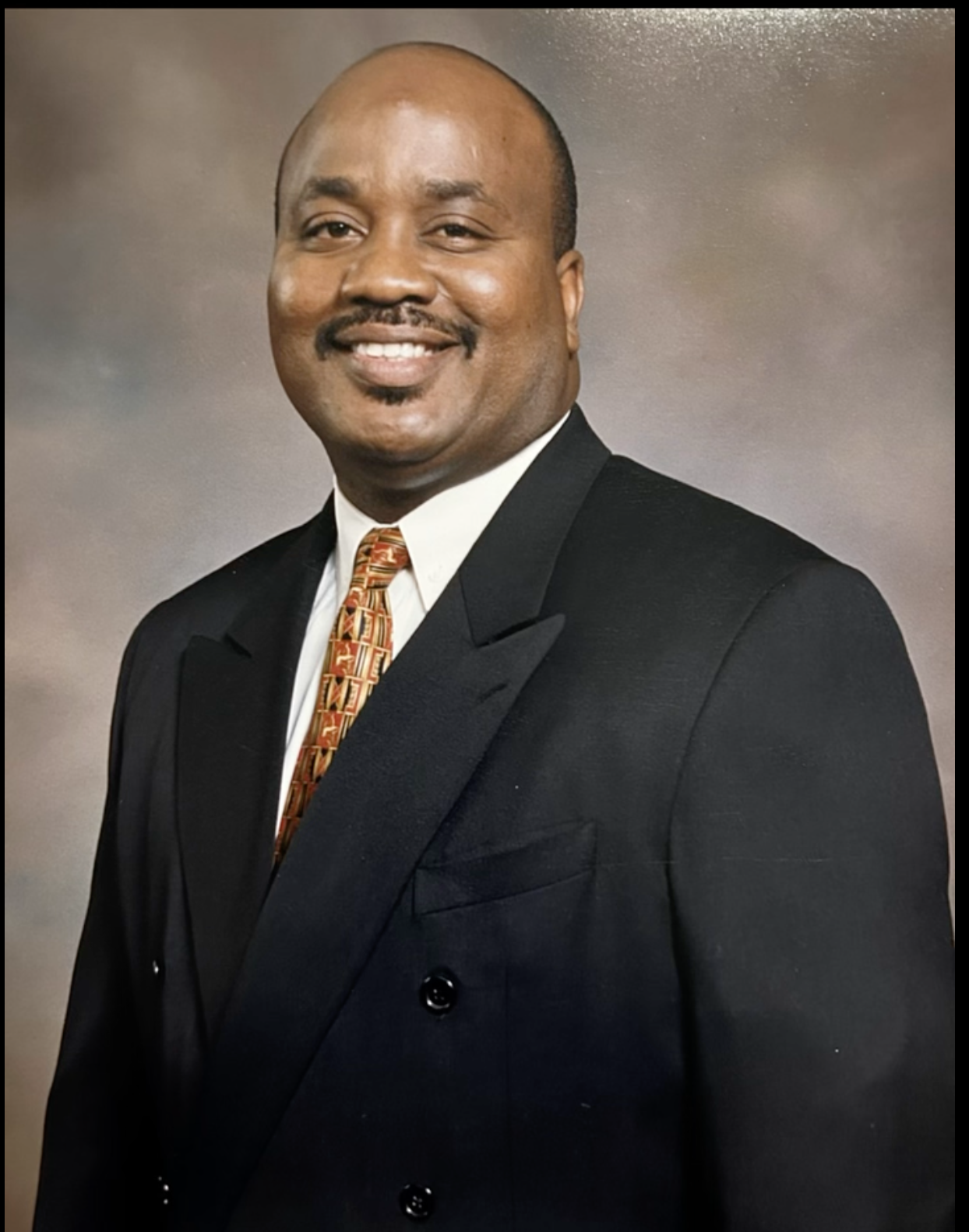
- Jones as a member of the Jefferson Parish Council representing District 3.

Member of the Jefferson Parish Council from District 3
- In office 1991–2003
- Preceded by: District established
- Succeeded by: Byron Lee

Member of the Jefferson Parish School Board
- In office 1988–1991
- Appointed by: Frederick Heebe

Personal details
- Born: June 6, 1959 (age 67) New Orleans, Louisiana, U.S.
- Education: Xavier University of Louisiana
- Profession: Insurance agent, pastor, business executive

Donald Ray Jones Sr. (born June 6, 1959) is an American former local elected official from Jefferson Parish, Louisiana. He served on the Jefferson Parish School Board and later represented District 3 on the Jefferson Parish Council.

== Early life and education ==
Donald Ray Jones Sr. was born on June 6, 1959, in New Orleans, Louisiana, and later lived in Marrero. He graduated from West Jefferson High School and Xavier University of New Orleans, where he earned a bachelor's degree in political science. Jones later attended seminary and earned a doctorate in theology.

== Early career and school board service ==
Prior to his election to the parish council, Jones worked in the private sector as president of Jones Insurance Agency. In 1988, Federal District Judge Frederick Heebe appointed Jones to the Jefferson Parish School Board, and he was later described by The Times-Picayune as the first African-American member appointed to the school board at the time.

== Jefferson Parish Council election and redistricting context ==
Jones was elected to represent District 3 on the Jefferson Parish Council in 1991. At the time of his 1995 re-election campaign, Jones was the first and only African-American member of the Jefferson Parish Council. His election as District 3 council representative marked the first time in the twentieth century that an African American had been elected to the Jefferson Parish Council.

His election followed federal voting-rights litigation challenging the parish's council districting structure. In October 1991, The Times-Picayune reported that the District 3 election followed a lawsuit filed by the East Jefferson Coalition in 1986 that sought a majority-African-American council district and alleged dilution of minority voting power. The United States District Court for the Eastern District of Louisiana later described the earlier litigation as a Section 2 Voting Rights Act challenge and determined that the parish's electoral system impeded minority voters' ability to elect representatives of their choice.

Following that litigation, Jefferson Parish adopted a revised redistricting plan that retained a six-district and one at-large council layout, establishing District 3 as a majority-Black district. Contemporary reporting by The Times-Picayune described the new District 3 as a geographically broad council district in which 60.9 percent of voters were Black, and noted that no Black candidate had previously been elected to the Jefferson Parish Council. The United States Department of Justice precleared the modified districting plan on August 27, 1991, and the first elections under the reconfigured boundaries took place later that year.

The boundaries of District 3 were later contested in Theriot v. Parish of Jefferson, where plaintiffs alleged that the configuration constituted an unconstitutional racial gerrymander. The federal district court entered judgment for the parish, finding that race had not predominated over traditional redistricting criteria in the creation of the district. This judgment was affirmed by the Fifth Circuit Court of Appeals, which held that while race was a factor, it was subordinated to non-racial districting principles, including political incumbency, communities of interest, one-person-one-vote requirements, and geographic boundaries. Jones was elected from District 3 in the first parish council election held under the revised redistricting plan.

In 2002, parish voters approved a charter amendment reducing the number of council districts from six to five and adding a second at-large seat. Because changes to Louisiana local government structures required federal approval under the Voting Rights Act, the proposal was subject to federal review. A primary issue under federal review was whether a five-district map could preserve the majority-Black district established in the early 1990s without diluting minority voting strength.

== Council tenure and public projects ==
During his first term on the Jefferson Parish Council, Jones emphasized economic development in District 3. In a 1995 candidate profile, he said the district had lower per-capita income and lower average schooling levels than the parish overall, and described economic development as a way to improve self-sufficiency among residents. His listed platform included attracting jobs and businesses, road work, drainage, and recreational improvements.

In 1994, a $1.4 million improvement project for Marrero Action Playground moved toward construction. The project was funded through federal Community Development money, parish discretionary money from off-track betting taxes, and $350,000 from the state capital outlay budget. Planned improvements included a walking and running track, jumping areas, a shot put area, new bleachers, additional parking, lighting and drainage improvements, and a second entrance at Jordan Street.

In April 1994, Councilman Jones was one of several Black Jefferson Parish Elected Officials who asked Gov. Edwin Edwards to mediate the situation surrounding Sheriff Harry Lee, after 2 African Americans died in police custody. Community leaders at the time accused Lee and his office of ignoring Black Jefferson Parish residents rights and not providing proper police representation.

The Jefferson Parish Council approved a $4.8 million contract in 1995 for a pumping station intended to reduce flooding in the Lincolnshire and Westminster subdivisions. Jones said the project would help reduce prior flooding problems, and parish drainage officials said the station would increase drainage capacity in the area by more than 50 percent. In 2001, Jones and Councilman Lloyd Giardina said they would recommend accepting a $10.9 million bid to build a Bayou Segnette pumping station to improve drainage in Waggaman, Bridge City, and Avondale.

During the 1999 campaign, Jones cited several district projects and economic-development efforts, including waterline efforts for Grand Isle and Waggaman, street improvements in the South New Orleans and Bunche Village neighborhoods, a special gambling district connected to Boomtown Casino, planning for the Harvey Canal area, proposed widening of Lapalco Boulevard, walking trails, medical clinics, and state legislation involving donation of blighted property to organizations.

Jones also used discretionary funds for community and development projects. In 1995, The Times-Picayune reported that he awarded a $25,000 grant to the Jefferson Housing Foundation for an entrepreneurial training program. In 1998, the newspaper listed $634,000 in discretionary spending associated with Jones, including allocations to Marrero Action Playground, Jefferson Housing Foundation, Avondale Walking Track, Mission Possible, Waggaman COPS, tutoring, scholarships, and other community programs. The article noted that discretionary money came from gambling and tourism taxes allocated to each council member.

== Campaigns and controversies ==
In December 1992, the Jefferson Parish Council voted to cancel a $50,000 parish grant previously approved for an African-American history museum in Westwego and removed the Black Chamber of Commerce from a nominating committee for political appointees. Jones stated that the decisions were based on concerns that the chamber and the local chapter of the National Heritage Foundation were not sufficiently focused on economic development in Black neighborhoods. Representatives of the affected organizations objected to the decision and criticized Jones's role in the dispute.

During his 1995 re-election campaign, challengers Elaine Comeaux and Frank Jones criticized Jones's responsiveness to the district and his use of public funds. Opponents cited a $1,800 helicopter flight Jones took to Grand Isle for a meeting with tourism and business officials. Jones dismissed the criticism, saying the issue was minor and that the flight allowed him to use his time efficiently while representing his constituents. Critics also alleged that Jones steered parish contracts to friends and associates; Jones denied awarding parish money based on personal ties and said he considered capacity and motivation when selecting recipients.

In the 1999 election cycle, opponents Cedric Floyd and Danny Webber criticized Jones over accessibility to constituents. Floyd also criticized the handling of parish housing funds connected to the Jefferson Housing Foundation, a private nonprofit organization staffed by associates of Jones that had parish contracts for first-time homebuyer training, entrepreneurial training, and housing renovation work. The foundation had faced scrutiny over poor record-keeping and questioned expenditures from 1997 and 1998 and had been called before the Legislative Audit Advisory Council. Jones said the criticism was overblown and defended the foundation's earlier record, saying it had received strong audits from 1993 to 1997, trained 2,000 potential homeowners, and helped 600 people become homeowners. Jones ran for state representative in Louisiana's 87th district twice, in 2003 and then again in 2005 losing to opposing candidates.

In 2019, Jones ran for district 3's open council seat hoping to secure a win for the next 4 years of term, with Jones being joined by a crowded ballot of well known Black Jefferson Parish Politicians, all battling it out to win the open black-majority district 3. Ultimately, Jones conceded the run, endorsing Councilman Byron Lee for the seat, which ultimately Byron won at the run-off with Derrick Shepherd.

== Private career, ministry and recognition ==
Outside of elected office, Jones was associated with several business and media ventures. A 2018 Times-Picayune feature identified him as chief executive officer of Jones Insurance Agency, CEO/President of STEP Construction, LLC, and founder of New Orleans Talk Network.

Jones later served as pastor of Bethesda House of Prayer in Marrero, Louisiana.

In 2018, Jones was recognized at an honor program held at Bethesda House of Prayer. Jefferson Parish President Michael Yenni issued a proclamation declaring February 23 as "Donald R. Jones Day," and local and state officials presented proclamations or remarks recognizing Jones's public-service career.

In a February 2025 WYES Informed Sources special on Jefferson Parish's bicentennial, Dillard University professor and commentator Robert Collins identified Jones among notable figures in Jefferson Parish history, citing his 1991 election as a historical first for a Black member of the Jefferson Parish Council being Jones.
