= Hot Millions =

1968 film by Eric Till

- Theatrical release poster
- Directed by: Eric Till
- Written by: Ira Wallach; Peter Ustinov
- Produced by: Mildred Freed Alberg
- Starring: Peter Ustinov; Maggie Smith; Karl Malden; Bob Newhart; Robert Morley; Cesar Romero
- Cinematography: Kenneth Higgins
- Edited by: Richard Marden
- Music by: Laurie Johnson
- Production company: Milberg Productions
- Distributed by: Metro-Goldwyn-Mayer
- Release date: September 19, 1968
- Running time: 106 minutes
- Country: United Kingdom
- Language: English

Hot Millions is a 1968 British caper film directed by Eric Till and produced by Mildred Freed Alberg, from a collaborative screenplay by Ira Wallach and Peter Ustinov, who stars in the film alongside Maggie Smith, Karl Malden, Bob Newhart, Robert Morley and Cesar Romero. The music score was composed by Laurie Johnson, featuring the single "This Time" by Scottish singer Lulu. The cinematographer was Kenneth Higgins.

== Plot ==
Con artist Marcus Pendleton has just been released from prison for embezzlement. He has emerged into a world increasingly reliant on computers. He convinces computer programmer Caesar Smith to follow his lifelong dream of hunting moths in the Amazon rainforest. Assuming Caesar's identity (how he does this is not explained in the film), he gains employment at the London offices of an American conglomerate called Tacanco. While Marcus fools executive vice president Carlton Klemper, another Tacanco executive, vice president Willard Gnatpole, is suspicious. As Caesar Smith, Marcus uses the company's computer systems to send claim cheques to himself under various aliases and addresses all over Europe. For his Paris company, the cheques go to 'Claude Debussy' and his cheques to Italy go to 'Gioachino Rossini', both famous (but conveniently dead) composers.

He meets and marries Patty, an inept secretary and frustrated flautist. As Caesar, he now has the problem of hiding his hot money. Beating discovery of his fraud by Gnatpole, he and Patty flee to Brazil when Klemper and Gnatpole fly to Rio after Patty invited them. In a twist, it seems that a now-heavily pregnant Patty found the loose change from his foreign visits money and invested it in companies Marcus mumbled about in his sleep, thus making a profit for Tacanco. Patty offers to sell the stock back at a reduced price, repaying the money stolen by her husband. Wanting to have the baby back in England, she has invited Klemper and Gnatpole to 'visit'. She persuades Klemper to rehire Marcus as Taranco's treasurer: the reformed embezzler could easily spot fraud, and would not steal from his own company. Though unhappy about his new legal status, Marcus agrees.

The film ends with Marcus conducting an orchestra (one of his dreams) as Gnatpole and Klemper sit in the audience. Patty, still expecting, is the solo flautist. As she finishes her solo, she realizes the baby is on the way, to which a concerned Marcus whispers, "What, now?"

== Cast ==
- Peter Ustinov as Marcus Pendleton / Caesar Smith
- Maggie Smith as Patty Terwilliger Smith
- Karl Malden as Carlton J. Klemper
- Bob Newhart as Willard C. Gnatpole
- Robert Morley as Caesar Smith
- Cesar Romero as Customs Inspector
- Lynda Baron as Louise the Waitress (uncredited)

== Locations ==
Filmed at MGM-British Studios, Borehamwood, Hertfordshire, England, and on location.

When Maggie Smith's character takes Bob Newhart's character shopping, she is seen buying an outfit at the Apple Boutique on Baker Street, London, which was owned by the Beatles. The boutique only operated for a few months before closing; Hot Millions provides one of the few filmed glimpses of its interior.

The car driven by Newhart’s character is a Jensen Interceptor.

== Reception ==
The film was loss-making but was moderately budgeted. Film critic of the time, Pauline Kael, described the movie as a "whimsical film about timid people" which offered movie goers a cozy, uplifted feeling.

== Awards ==
In 1969 the film was nominated for an Academy Award for Best Writing, Story and Screenplay - Written Directly for the Screen — losing out to Mel Brooks for The Producers — and for a Writers Guild of America award for Best Written American Comedy, losing to Neil Simon for The Odd Couple.
