= Newell Normand =

Sheriff of Jefferson Parish, Louisiana

Sheriff of Jefferson Parish, Louisiana
- In office October 1, 2007 – August 31, 2017
- Preceded by: Harry Lee
- Succeeded by: Joseph Lopinto

Personal details
- Born: Los Angeles, California, USA
- Party: Republican
- Education: Jesuit High School, New Orleans University of New Orleans Tulane University
- Occupation: Law enforcement officer, lawyer
- Website: Jefferson Parish Sheriff's Office: official website; Newell Normand campaign: official website

Newell D. Normand is a former sheriff of Jefferson Parish, Louisiana. He previously served in various command positions within the Jefferson Parish Sheriff's Office before being elected in 2007 after the death of then Sheriff Harry Lee. Prior to joining the Jefferson Parish Sheriff's Office, he started his law enforcement career in the Orleans Parish Criminal Sheriff's Office serving high risk warrants and court capias.

Normand has a bachelor's degree in business administration from the University of New Orleans and a law degree from Tulane University. He is also a graduate of the FBI National Academy.

He is currently a host on WWL (AM).

== Controversy ==
At a press conference in December 2016, Normand spoke out against the criticism he and his office had received concerning their handling of their investigation into Joe McKnight's shooting. Normand read, word-for-word, several explicit tweets, Facebook posts, and other expressions of criticism. So explicit was Normand's speech that, according to NBC News, MSNBC interrupted its live coverage because it contained words not appropriate for broadcast on basic cable.
