= China Lee =

American model and actress (born 1942)

Playboy centerfold appearance
- August 1964
- Preceded by: Melba Ogle
- Succeeded by: Astrid Schulz

Personal details
- Born: Margaret Lee; September 2, 1942 (age 83) New Orleans, Louisiana, U.S.
- Height: 5 ft 4.5 in (164 cm)

China Lee (pronounced Chee-na; born Margaret Lee; September 2, 1942) is an American model and actress. She was Playboy's Playmate of the Month for the August 1964 issue and the first Asian American Playmate. Her centerfold was photographed by Pompeo Posar. According to her Playmate profile, her name is pronounced "chee-na" to rhyme with "Tina".

== Early life ==
Lee was born in New Orleans, Louisiana, to Chinese parents who immigrated to the United States after marriage. The family-owned a laundry and, later, a much-lauded restaurant. She is the youngest of eight children and the younger sister of Harry Lee, who served as the sheriff of Jefferson Parish, Louisiana for about 28 years. The name "China" is derived from the nickname "Chinita" ("little Chinese girl") bestowed on her by Spanish-speaking neighbors who admired her dancing as a child.

== Career ==
Lee worked as a hairstylist and waitress, then as a Playboy Bunny, before appearing in Playboy. She had been a "Training Bunny," which required her to travel to different Playboy Clubs to teach prospective Bunnies their duties.

Lee appeared at the end of Woody Allen's What's Up, Tiger Lily?, performing a striptease.

== Personal life ==
Lee married comedian Mort Sahl in 1967. They divorced in 1991. Their only child, Mort Sahl Jr., died on March 27, 1996, at the age of 19.

Year	Title	Role	Notes
1964	The Troublemaker	The Hooker	
1965	Dr. Goldfoot and the Bikini Machine	Robot	
1966	Harper	Dancer	Uncredited
1966	Paradise, Hawaiian Style	Girl	Uncredited
1966	What's Up, Tiger Lily?	Dancer in Credits	Uncredited
1966	The Swinger	Model	Uncredited
1967	The Girl from U.N.C.L.E.	Vivian	Episode: "The Double-O-Nothing Affair"
1967	Good Times	Mordicus' Girl	
1967	Don't Make Waves	Waitress	Uncredited
1969	Medium Cool	Roller Derby Patron	(final film role)

Sharon Rogers	Nancy Jo Hooper	Nancy Scott	Ashlyn Martin	Terri Kimball	Lori Winston
Melba Ogle	China Lee	Astrid Schulz	Rosemarie Hillcrest	Kai Brendlinger	Jo Collins
