= Alexander Mackendrick =

Scottish film director (1912–1993)

- Born: 8 September 1912; Boston, Massachusetts, U.S.
- Died: 22 December 1993 (aged 81); Los Angeles, California, U.S.
- Education: Hillhead High School
- Alma mater: Glasgow School of Art
- Occupations: Film director; screenwriter; academic
- Years active: 1937–1969 (filmmaking); 1969–1993 (academic)
- Spouse(s): Eileen Ashcroft (1934–1943); Hilary Lloyd (1948–1993)
- Relatives: Roger MacDougall (cousin)

Alexander Mackendrick (8 September 1912 – 22 December 1993) was an American-born Scottish film director and screenwriter. He directed nine feature films between 1949 and 1967, before retiring from filmmaking to become an influential professor at the California Institute of the Arts.

Born to Scottish parents in Boston, he was raised in Glasgow from the age of six. He began making television commercials before moving into post-production editing and directing films, most notably for Ealing Studios where his films include Whisky Galore! (1949), The Man in the White Suit (1951) - which earned him an Oscar nomination for Best Screenplay, The Maggie (1954), and The Ladykillers (1955).

In 1957, Mackendrick directed his first American film Sweet Smell of Success, which was a critical success, but a commercial failure . His directing career declined throughout the following decade, and he was fired or replaced from several projects, owing in part to his perfectionist approach to filmmaking.

Mackendrick retired from directing in the late 1960s after completing A High Wind in Jamaica (1965) and Don't Make Waves (1967), becoming the founding Dean (and later a Professor) of the CalArts School of Film/Video.

== Early life ==
He was born on September 8, 1912, the only child of Francis and Martha Mackendrick who had emigrated to the United States from Glasgow in 1911. His father was a ship builder and a civil engineer. When Mackendrick was six, his father died of influenza as a result of the influenza pandemic that swept the world just after World War I. His mother, in desperate need of work, decided to become a dress designer. In order to pursue that decision, it was necessary for Martha Mackendrick to hand her only son over to his grandfather, who took young MacKendrick back to Scotland in early 1919 when he was six years old. Mackendrick never saw or heard from his mother again.

Mackendrick had a sad and lonely childhood. He attended Hillhead High School in Glasgow from 1919 to 1926 and then went on to spend three years at the Glasgow School of Art. In the early 1930s, Mackendrick moved to London to work as an art director for the advertising firm J. Walter Thompson. Between 1936 and 1938, Mackendrick scripted five cinema commercials. He later reflected that his work in the advertising industry was invaluable, in spite of his extreme dislike of the industry itself. Mackendrick wrote his first film script with his cousin and close friend, Roger MacDougall. It was bought by Associated British and later released, after script revisions, as Midnight Menace (1937).

== Career ==
At the start of the Second World War, Mackendrick was employed by the Ministry of Information making British propaganda films. In 1942, he went to Algiers and then to Italy, working with the British Army's Psychological Warfare Division. He then shot newsreels, documentaries, made leaflets, and did radio news. In 1943, he became the director of the film unit and approved the production of Roberto Rossellini's early neorealist film, Rome, Open City (1945).

=== Ealing Studios ===
After the war, Mackendrick and Roger MacDougall set up Merlin Productions, where they produced documentaries for the Ministry of Information. Merlin Productions soon proved financially unviable. In 1946 Mackendrick joined Ealing Studios, originally as a scriptwriter and production designer, where he worked for nine years and directed five films made at Ealing; Whisky Galore! (US: Tight Little Island, 1949), The Man in the White Suit (1951), Mandy (1952), The Maggie (US: High and Dry, 1954) and The Ladykillers (1955), the first two and the last being among the best known of Ealing's films.

=== America ===
Mackendrick often spoke of his dislike of the film industry and decided to leave the United Kingdom for Hollywood in 1955. When the base of Ealing studios was sold that year, Mackendrick was cut loose to pursue a career as a freelance director, something he was never prepared to do:

At Ealing ... I was tremendously spoiled with all the logistical and financial troubles lifted off my shoulders, even if I had to do the films they told me to do. The reason why I have discovered myself so much happier teaching is that when I arrived here after the collapse of the world I had known as Ealing, I found that in order to make movies in Hollywood, you have to be a great deal-maker ... I have no talent for that ... I realised I was in the wrong business and got out.

The rest of his professional life was spent commuting between London and Los Angeles. His first film after his initial return to the United States was Sweet Smell of Success (1957), produced by Hecht-Hill-Lancaster Productions (HHL). This was a critically successful film about a press agent (Tony Curtis) who is wrapped up in a powerful newspaper columnist's (Burt Lancaster) plot to end the relationship between his younger sister and a jazz musician. Mackendrick got along poorly with the producers of the film because they felt that he was too much of a perfectionist. In the same period, Mackendrick assisted Dutch film maker Bert Haanstra with the production of the comedy film, Fanfare (1958).

After his disappointment with HHL, Mackendrick directed several television commercials in Europe for Horlicks.

He also made a handful of films throughout the Sixties including Sammy Going South (1963) for former Ealing producer Michael Balcon now with Bryanston Pictures, A High Wind in Jamaica (1965), and Don't Make Waves (1967). Sammy Going South was entered into the 3rd Moscow International Film Festival.

== Unmade projects ==
After Sweet Smell of Success, Mackendrick returned to Britain to make the second HHL film, The Devil's Disciple (1959), but he was fired a month into production owing to lingering tension from their first project together. Mackendrick was devastated.

Mackendrick was replaced on The Guns of Navarone for allegedly being too much of a perfectionist for spending more time than planned on scouting Mediterranean locations and insisting on elements of ancient Greek literature in the screenplay.

A project to film Ionesco's Rhinoceros, which would have starred Tony Hancock and Barbara Windsor, fell through at the last minute.

=== Mary, Queen of Scots and retirement ===
For several years, Mackendrick was set to direct a biopic of Mary, Queen of Scots, starring Mia Farrow and Oliver Reed. Universal Pictures was set to finance and distribute, and filming was set to begin in the spring of 1969. However, one month before principal photography was scheduled to start, Universal cancelled the project. The studio later financed a version of the film released in 1971, directed by Charles Jarrott and starring Glenda Jackson.

Mackendrick was disillusioned by the experience and retired from directing shortly thereafter. The script by Mackendrick and Jay Presson Allen has been well-received and the subject of academic appraisal, described as the director's "lost masterwork." In 2018, the script was adapted into a radio drama by the BBC.

== CalArts ==
In 1969 he returned to the United States after being appointed the founding Dean of the film school of the California Institute of the Arts (now the CalArts School of Film/Video), giving up the position in 1978 to become a professor at the school.

With regard to his teaching style, former student Douglas Rushkoff, noted: "One of my greatest teachers, the filmmaker Alexander Mackendrick (Sweet Smell of Success, The Man in the White Suit) insisted that to make films, we had to know everything about them. He studied the anatomy and functioning of the eye, so that he could know how the light reflected on a movie screen interacted with the optic nerve and the brain. He learned the chemistry of emulsion, so that he'd understand the way images burned themselves onto film stock. If one of us turned in 10 pages of a script we were working on, Mackendrick would present us the next day with 20 pages of notes, showing more appreciation for our work and process than we did ourselves. Mackendrick also insisted that we relish the physical sensations of making movies. If we didn't appreciate the pencils with which we drew our storyboards, or the texture of the paper, then how could we invest our drawings with the level of passion worthy of the kinds of budgets we hoped to spend on them? I remember him telling one student that her drawings were written too tentatively, as if the colored pencils she used to create them had been borrowed and she was afraid of using them up. He was right: she had borrowed the pencils from her roommate. He told her to work an extra job, if she had to, in order to finance her own pencils, which she could abuse to her heart's content.What Mackendrick meant to communicate, in so many words, was that if you don't love enough the particulars of the experience of what you do to devour the tangible details, or if you don't care enough about your work to find out everything there is to know, then you'll never be able to get into it, and you'll never come up with anything original. Maintaining anything less than total commitment is to be a dilettante."

Some of Mackendrick's most notable students include David Kirkpatrick, Terence Davies, F. X. Feeney, James Mangold, Stephen Mills, Thom Mount, Julien Nitzberg, Sean Daniel, Bruce Berman, Gregory Orr, Douglas Rushkoff, Lee Sheldon, Bob Rogers, and Laurence Wright amongst others.

A collection of Mackendrick's handouts and lectures at CalArts were collected and published in the book On Film-Making : An Introduction to the Craft of the Director, with a foreword by Martin Scorsese.

== Illness and death ==
Mackendrick suffered from severe emphysema for many years and as a result, was unable to go home to Europe during much of his time at the college. He stayed with the school until he died of pneumonia in 1993, aged 81. His remains are buried at Westwood Village Memorial Park Cemetery.

== Legacy and appraisal ==
Critical consensus of Mackendrick's body of work, both as a filmmaker and later as a teacher, has grown significantly over time. In his obituary, critic Anthony Lane compared him positively to both Alfred Hitchcock and Fritz Lang. Paul Cronin described him as "one of Britain's greatest film directors.... and one of the finest instructors of narrative cinema who ever lived."

Geoffrey O'Brien described Mackendrick as a "singularly elusive sort of auteur," whose films' "controlled surfaces and exquisitely lucid storylines a potential for chaos and violence swirls almost palpably. His reasonable and civilized art is profoundly in tune with instinctive forces that can manifest themselves as ecstatic celebration but also as tribal warfare or relentless perseverance in a private mission."

The British Film Institute's Screenonline profile of Mackendrick called him:

"a perfectionist in an industry devoted to profit.... But if the overall sense of Mackendrick's career is of great potential unfulfilled, his oeuvre, though small, is distinctive and always rewarding, the work of a visually acute filmmaker who thought in images and movement whilst always remaining in command of cinematic storytelling; a director whose films offer a complex and ambiguous mix of pessimism, callousness, mordant humour and startling empathy with the innocent and brutal world of the child."

The Harvard Film Archive wrote of Mackendrick during a 2009 retrospective:

"The full appreciation of Mackendrick's oeuvre as a whole—which only began in earnest during the 1970s—has accelerated since his death, a re-evaluation that has found his lesser-known and later films equally rewarding as his acknowledged masterpieces. This belated appreciation no doubt owes a debt to Mackendrick's classicism, his dedication to well-crafted, character-driven narratives that avoid baroque visual excess in favor of a subtler authorial stamp, the complex emotional and intergenerational dynamics that unite Mackendrick's films, be they funny, disturbing, moving or a heady combination of all three."

Film director Paul Thomas Anderson expressed admiration for Mackendrick's films, citing Sweet Smell of Success one of his favorites, showcasing its influence on Anderson's cinematic style. In a 1999 interview, Anderson advised aspiring filmmakers to watch all of Mackendrick's movies.

Mackendrick is the namesake of the Alexander Mackendrick Award for Best Director at the St. Andrews Film Festival.

== Filmography ==
Year	Title	Functioned as		Notes	Ref.
Year	Title	Director	Writer	Notes	Ref.
1949	Whisky Galore!	Yes	No		
1950	The Blue Lamp	2nd Unit	Yes	Script doctor	
1951	The Man in the White Suit	Yes	Yes		
1952	Mandy	Yes	Story		
1954	The Maggie	Yes	No		
1955	The Ladykillers	Yes	No		
1957	Sweet Smell of Success	Yes	No		
1963	Sammy Going South	Yes	No		
1965	A High Wind in Jamaica	Yes	No		
1967	Don't Make Waves	Yes	No		

=== Writer only ===
Year	Title	Director	Ref.
1937	Midnight Menace	Sinclair Hill	
1948	Saraband for Dead Lovers	Basil Dearden	
1950	Dance Hall	Charles Crichton	

== Awards and honours ==
Institution	Year	Category	Work	Result
Academy Award	1953	Best Screenplay	The Man in the White Suit	Nominated
Moscow International Film Festival	1963	Grand Prix	Sammy Going South	Nominated
Telluride Film Festival	1986	Silver Medallion	—N/a	Won
Venice Film Festival	1952	Golden Lion	Mandy	Nominated
Venice Film Festival	1952	Special Jury Prize	Mandy	Won
