= Stephanie Mills (disambiguation) =

Stephanie Mills (born 1957) is an American R&B, soul and gospel singer.

Stephanie Mills may also refer to:

- Stephanie Anne Mills (born 1979), Canadian voice actress
- Stephanie Mills (All in the Family), a character from 1970s American television situation comedy All in the Family played by Danielle Brisebois
- Stephanie Mills (journalist) (born 1948), American ecologist
- Stephanie Mills (album), 1985
- Stephanie Mills (Coronation Street), a 2002 character from British soap Coronation Street played by Rebecca Atkinson

== See also ==
- Steve Mills (disambiguation)
- Stephanie Miller (born 1961), American political commentator, comedian and host of The Stephanie Miller Show
- Stephanie Millward (born 1981), British Paralympic swimmer
