= Harry Lee (sheriff) =

American sheriff in Louisiana (1932–2007)

Sheriff of Jefferson Parish
- In office April 1, 1980 – October 1, 2007
- Preceded by: Andrew George
- Succeeded by: Newell Normand

Personal details
- Born: August 27, 1932 New Orleans, Louisiana, U.S.
- Died: October 1, 2007 (aged 75) New Orleans, Louisiana, U.S.
- Resting place: Metairie Cemetery
- Party: Democratic
- Spouse: Lai Lee
- Children: 1
- Relatives: China Lee (sister)
- Education: Louisiana State University (BS); Loyola University New Orleans (JD)

Military service
- Allegiance: United States
- Branch/service: United States Air Force
- Years of service: 1955–1987
- Rank: Brigadier General; Assistant Adjutant General
- Unit: Louisiana National Guard

Harry Lee (August 27, 1932 – October 1, 2007) was an American law enforcement officer, lawyer, and folk figure who served as sheriff of Jefferson Parish, Louisiana. He was first elected in 1979 as the thirtieth sheriff, and was re-elected six times, having served twenty-eight years and six months.

== Early years and legal career ==
Lee attended Francis T. Nicholls High School and graduated from Louisiana State University with a degree in geology. He also served in the Air Force and after being honorably discharged in 1959, Lee returned to Louisiana to manage his father's restaurant, The House of Lee. Lee was elected president of the New Orleans Chapter of the Louisiana Restaurant Association in 1964. His leadership was instrumental in the peaceful racial integration of New Orleans restaurants, in compliance with the Civil Rights Act of 1964.

At this time, he also attended Loyola University New Orleans School of Law, where he was elected president of the student chapter of the Bar Association. Lee graduated in 1967 and started a small law practice in Gretna with Loyola classmate Marion Edwards (not to be confused with the brother of future Governor Edwin Washington Edwards - whom Lee was a very avid supporter of - who shares the same name).

Lee was appointed as a magistrate judge for the United States District Court for the Eastern District of Louisiana in 1971. He was elected president of the National Council of United States Magistrates in 1973. He was invited to join the congressional delegation to the People's Republic of China in 1972, which was led by House Majority Leader Hale Boggs from Louisiana, and House Minority Leader and future U.S. President Gerald Ford. He resigned as a Federal Magistrate in 1975 and was appointed Parish Attorney for Jefferson Parish.

== Political career ==
Lee was elected sheriff in 1979, having defeated long-time incumbent Alwynn Cronvich. He was re-elected every four years from 1983 to 2003. He was credited with keeping the crime rate low for the past twenty-five years, while the rate in neighboring Orleans Parish remains one of the highest in the nation.

In 1989, Lee deplored the choice of David Duke and John S. Treen standing as Republicans for the vacancy in state House District 81 created by the resignation of Charles Cusimano, who became a state court judge. To Lee, the showdown in the special election was a choice between "a bigot and an asshole."

A Democrat, Lee ran for governor in 1995 but dropped out before the primary. He famously said, "why would I want to be governor when I can be king?" Lee endorsed Mike Foster, a Republican who came from behind in the polls to win the governorship and to serve two terms. He also endorsed Bobby Jindal for governor in 2003, his bid for Congress in 2004, 2006 reelection and again for governor in 2007.

Lee, one of the best-known politicians in the Greater New Orleans Area, was known as a zealous crime fighter. He also gained a reputation as an anti-corruption reformer while serving as the Parish Attorney for Jefferson Parish. Lee was a political insider in Louisiana, and had close personal contacts with former Governor Edwards and the Boggs family in New Orleans. He often made controversial statements to the local media. He showed unwavering loyalty to his deputies during allegations of police brutality in Jefferson Parish.

In April of 1994, Dr Donald Ray Jones Sr and other Black Jefferson Parish elected officials requested that Governor Edwin Edwards mediate tensions between Lee's office and the black community following the deaths of two African Americans in Jefferson Parish custody. Local black community leaders alleging that Lee's office ignored black residents' concerns & failed to provide adequate police representation. He had also shown support for other Louisiana politicians during several federal investigations of government corruption, including the investigation and eventual conviction of Edwards. Many of these politicians were personal friends of Lee, but Lee himself was never charged with corruption.

Lee also defended gambling and claimed abuses were no more severe that those with addictions to alcohol and tobacco. He earmarked gambling revenues for jail buildings and maintenance. Without video poker, Lee said that Jefferson Parish would lose nearly $4 million annually in public revenues.

=== Hurricane Katrina ===
Lee maintained a strong presence during Hurricane Katrina. Most memorably, the morning before Katrina hit New Orleans, Lee appeared on emergency radio, with a message for those who had not yet evacuated: "You better haul ass! Y'all should have left yesterday." The previous evening, he had let the community know that his birthday party had been cancelled.

Lee was one of the few New Orleans politicians to maintain his pre-Katrina popularity. During the storm, Parish President Aaron Broussard evacuated all parish personnel directly under his control to St. Tammany Parish on the Northshore, including the drainage pump operators. This is widely considered the primary cause of flooding on the Eastbank of Jefferson Parish. However, the Sheriff's Office in Jefferson Parish is independent of the Parish President and operates directly under an elected sheriff.

When storm conditions dissipated, Jefferson Parish deputies immediately began patrolling all major commercial roads and even individual neighborhoods in the Parish. Most of the Parish at this time had been evacuated, and communications were nearly non-existent. Parish deputies were the only form of security in the Parish in the first week after the storm.

Most of the looting that did take place in Jefferson Parish occurred in Terrytown and Gretna, which borders on Algiers and the Crescent City Connection. The Jefferson Parish Sheriff's Office has jurisdiction over all of unincorporated Jefferson Parish, while incorporated cities such as Gretna, Kenner, Harahan and Westwego have their own independent city governments and police departments. In the first week after the storm, Sheriff Lee and Gretna Police Chief Arthur Lawson Jr ordered Gretna police officers and Jefferson Parish deputies to set up a roadblock on the Crescent City Connection and prevent New Orleans evacuees from crossing. This action has been praised by some Gretna residents but criticized by many Orleans Parish elected officials. Lee was named as a co-defendant in the subsequent lawsuits, as he was directly involved in ordering the bridge barricaded.

== Personal life ==
Lee is the older brother of Playboy magazine's first Asian-American centerfold, China Lee.

Lee's family is affiliated with the Chinese Presbyterian Church in Kenner. Since his death, unused funds totalling more than $250,000 from his campaign war chest have been donated to the church in accordance to his will.

== Death ==
Lee died five days after returning from M.D. Anderson Cancer Center in Houston for his latest round of treatment for leukemia. His death came less than three weeks before he hoped to win an eighth term in office. Lee had qualified to run in the October 20 primary against Harahan Police Chief Peter Dale and contractor Julio Castillo. State law requires qualifying to reopen if a candidate dies before the election is held.

On September 30, WWL-TV reported that Lee was hospitalized in serious condition due to complications from leukemia. Lee was reportedly having breathing problems and was taken to the Ochsner Medical Center. He died at 10:44 a.m. on October 1, 2007, and was interred four days later at Metairie Cemetery in New Orleans.

Shortly after Lee's death, the primary election for sheriff was moved from October 20 to November 17, and Newell Normand, a Republican, was appointed as the interim sheriff. Normand, who had been the chief deputy since 1995, was elected as the sheriff with over 90% of the vote and held the office until 2017.

In 2001, Lee was inducted into the Louisiana Political Museum and Hall of Fame in Winnfield. Only five other sheriffs have been so designated, including Cat Doucet and Jessel Ourso.
