= Our American Heritage =

NBC television specials (1959–1961)

Our American Heritage is a series of TV specials broadcast on NBC from 1959 to 1961.

Mildred Freed Alberg produced the program with the cooperation of American Heritage magazine. Lowell Thomas was the narrator. Directors included James Lee, Jack Smight and Alex Segal Writers included Morton Wishengrad, Tad Mosel, David Shaw, and Mann Rubin.

A total of thirteen episodes were aired on the National Broadcasting Company from October 18, 1959 to May 13, 1961. Actors who were featured included Raymond Massey, Dean Jagger, Walter Matthau, Roddy McDowall, Christopher Plummer, Susan Strasberg, Melvyn Douglas, Robert Redford, and Teresa Wright.

On January 27, 1960, the Thomas Alva Edison Foundations recognized Our American Heritage as "the television program best portraying America". The program was sponsored by The Equitable Life Assurance Society.

Episodes of the program included those shown in the table below:

Partial List of Episodes of Our American Heritage
Date	Title	Subject	Star(s)
October 18, 1959	"Divided We Stand"	Thomas Jefferson, Alexander Hamilton, George Washington	Ralph Bellamy, Arthur Kennedy, Howard St. John
November 22, 1959	"The Practical Dreamer"	Eli Whitney	Burgess Meredith
January 24, 1960	"Destiny, West"	John C. Frémont	Jeffrey Hunter
February 21, 1960	"Shadow of a Soldier"	Ulysses S. Grant	James Whitmore
April 10, 1960	–––	Andrew Carnegie	David Wayne, Judith Anderson
October 21, 1960	"Not Without Honor"	Alexander Hamilton	Arthur Kennedy, Ralph Bellamy
December 2, 1960	"Born a Giant"	Andrew Jackson	Bill Travers, Barbara Rush
January 13, 1961	"The Invincible Teddy"	Theodore Roosevelt	George Peppard
March 11, 1961	"The Secret Rebel"	John Honeyman	Hugh O'Brian
May 13, 1961	"Woodrow Wilson and the Unknown Soldier"	Woodrow Wilson	Judson Laire, Don Ameche
