= Steve Mills (vaudeville) =

American Burlesque performer (1895–1988)

Steve Mills (October 9, 1895 - March 9, 1988) was a Burlesque performer. Although he did stints in vaudeville, he was known and spent his lifetime on the Burlesque and Legitimate stage.

== Biography ==
Mills was born on October 9, 1895, in Boston, Massachusetts. His career in vaudeville began in 1910, when he appeared at an amateur night hosted by Fred Allen and Benny Rubin.

He married Roberta Lean (later Abagail Mills). With his first wife, Dorothy (Rosenthal) Mills, they had a daughter, Rachel Hope Mills.

He formed a comedy team called the Castle Trio around 1917. In 1924, he was in Whiz Bang Babies, and in 1926 he played the lead in Miss Tabasco. He next was a headliner for Bill Minsky at the Winter Garden Theater in Manhattan. He then signed with The Shubert Organization and appeared in Three Little Girls, No, No, Nanette (1925), and Prince of Pilsen. and many of the early Schubert Operettas. He alternated between working for the Shuberts with stints on the burlesque wheel. With the Shuberts, he appeared in A Lady Says Yes, starring Carole Landis. He ended his run in This Was Burlesque in 1977 after suffering a stroke, where he lost his speech. His last Broadway appearance was in 1971 in Arthur Whitelaw's production of 70, Girls, 70. He worked locally in Warwick, Rhode Island, where he had a home, and in Boston, his hometown, in a series of burlesque shows produced and directed by Abagail Mills. He appeared in a Minsky review at the Circus Circus Casino in Las Vegas in 1975. He returned to This Was Burlesque in 1975 and had a stroke after finishing the HBO production of This Was Burlesque. He retired from the theater, and then remained in his home in Warwick, Rhode Island.

Mills died on March 9, 1988, in Warwick, Rhode Island. He was survived by his wife, Abagail (Susan) Mills of 22 years, a daughter Rachel (Mills) Triana, and four grandchildren. He is buried in Rhode Island.
