= Muscle Beach (novel) =

1959 novel

- First edition
- Author: Ira Wallach
- Language: English
- Genre: Comedy-satire
- Publisher: Little, Brown and Company; Dell (paperback)
- Publication date: 1959
- Publication place: United States
- Media type: Print (hardcover and paperback)
- Pages: 236 pp (1st edition)

Muscle Beach is a 1959 novel by American writer Ira Wallach. It was reprinted in 1967 as a paperback under the new title Don't Make Waves.

== Plot ==
Carlo Cofield, a restless World War II vet in New York City, alternates between work at the Atlantic Novelty Company and hanging out at the Treble Bar listening to the Quo Vadis Quartet. Impulsively entering an office of Seaspray Swimming Pools, he pitches a sale to a client on Long Island. A condition of his making this sale is his being transferred to the Seaspray office in Los Angeles. During his flight to the West Coast, he places his neck-tie in an air-sickness bag for disposal, never to be worn again. In Los Angeles, he meets Vic Salter and his chimp Simeon in a bar on Sunset Boulevard. Vic introduces Carlo to hit songwriter Prescott Tom, whose sister Toby takes him to the beach to see the body builders. Carlo joins them to get close to the beautiful Jocelyn but eventually he finds happiness and fulfillment with Toby.

== Film adaptations ==
The novel was made into a 1967 film directed by Alexander Mackendrick and starring Tony Curtis, Sharon Tate and Claudia Cardinale. Ira Wallach wrote the screenplay and Mort Sahl has a small role.

== Reception ==
The novel generated a generally positive reaction in the New York Times Book Review: "Mr. Wallach is one of the deftest satirists at large and a master of the fragile art of parody." However, a review in Kirkus Reviews was more critical: "This, the author's first attempt at a novel, aims at the Peter De Vries type of verbal wit and falls far short of the mark."

== See also ==
- Muscle Beach
