= Stephen Mills (journalist) =

English filmmaker and author (born 1952)

- Born: 1 July 1952 (age 74); Oxford, England
- Occupations: wildlife filmmaker, journalist and author

Stephen Mills (born 1 July 1952) is an English wildlife filmmaker, conservation journalist and author. He has made, written or worked on over 40 wildlife films for television for stations such as the BBC and RTÉ. He has written a number of books and is a former Chairman of the International Association of Wildlife Filmmakers.

== Early life and education ==
Stephen Mills was born in Oxford on 1 July 1952 to Robert Walter and Betty (née Jones) Mills. He was educated at New College Preparatory School and St Edward's School, Oxford and was later a postmaster (scholar) of Merton College, Oxford. He graduated from Oxford in 1974 and earned a Master of Fine Arts in 1980 from California Institute of the Arts where he was a pupil of the film director Alexander Mackendrick.

== Films ==
He has made or worked on over 40 wildlife films for television, including the major BBC series Land of the Tiger with Valmik Thapar and The Private Life of Plants with Sir David Attenborough. He wrote and filmed Man-Eater: To Be or Not to Be for the BBC and wrote the award-winning BBC films Tiger Crisis and Wolf Saga. He has also written, filmed and co-produced several complete wildlife series for Radio Telefis Eireann. He is a former Chairman of the International Association of Wildlife Filmmakers.

== Writing and other work ==
Mills has written extensively for numerous journals, magazines and newspapers, in particular New Scientist, the Times Literary Supplement and BBC Wildlife, often focusing on investigative work. He was, for example, an early exposer of the risks to seabirds of overfishing and the threat of genetic decline in Britain's native trout and he has also written influential articles on the public role of wildlife films. For more than 15 years he was on the BBC Wildlife panel of advisers.

He is the author of Nature in Its Place (Bodley Head, 1988) and Tiger and is known for his writing on tigers. He also leads occasional specialist wildlife tours.

Mills' autobiography, 'Natural Causes', was published by Chiselbury in March 2024.
