= Mort Sahl =

American comedian and actor (1927–2021)

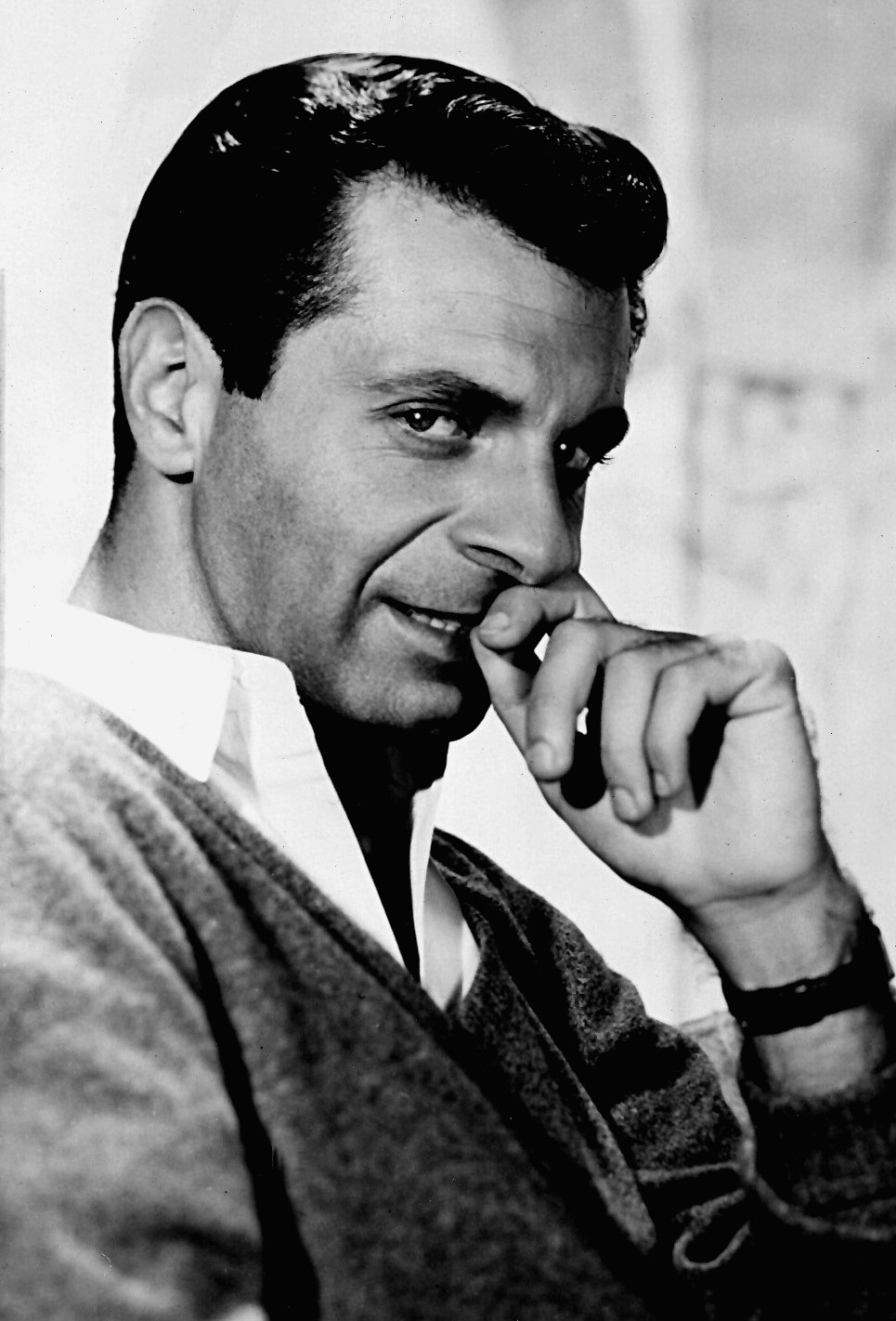
- Sahl in 1960
- Born: Morton Lyon Sahl; May 11, 1927; Montreal, Quebec, Canada
- Died: October 26, 2021 (aged 94); Mill Valley, California, U.S.
- Resting place: Hillside Memorial Park Cemetery, Culver City, California, U.S.
- Education: University of Southern California (BS)
- Spouses: Sue Babior (m. 1955; div. 1958); China Lee (m. 1967; div. 1991); Kenslea Ann Motter (m. 1997; div. 2009)

Comedy career
- Years active: 1950–2020
- Medium: Stand-up, television
- Genres: Political satire, improvisational comedy
- Subjects: American politics, American culture

Morton Lyon Sahl (May 11, 1927 – October 26, 2021) was a Canadian-born American comedian, actor, and social satirist. He pioneered a style of social satire that pokes fun at political and current event topics by means of improvised monologues, using only a newspaper as a prop.

Sahl spent his early years in Los Angeles and then moved to the San Francisco Bay Area, where he made his professional stage debut at the hungry i nightclub in 1953. His popularity grew quickly, and after a year at the club, he traveled the country doing shows at established nightclubs, theaters, and college campuses. In 1960 he became the first comedian to be featured in a Time cover story. He appeared on various television shows, played a number of film roles, and performed a one-man show on Broadway.

The television host Steve Allen said that Sahl was "the only real political philosopher we have in modern comedy". His social satire performances broke new ground in live entertainment, as a stand-up comic talking about the real world of politics at that time was considered "revolutionary". His act inspired many later comics to become stage comedians, including Lenny Bruce, Jonathan Winters, George Carlin, Richard Pryor, Lewis Black and Woody Allen. Allen credits Sahl's new style of humor with "opening up vistas for people like me".

Numerous politicians became his fans, with John F. Kennedy asking him to write his jokes for campaign speeches, though Sahl later turned his barbs at the president. After Kennedy's assassination in 1963, Sahl focused on what he said were the Warren Report's inaccuracies and conclusions and spoke about them often during his shows. This alienated much of his audience and led to a decline in his popularity for the remainder of the 1960s. By the 1970s, his shows and popularity staged a partial comeback that continued over the ensuing decades. A biography of Sahl, Last Man Standing, by James Curtis, was released in 2017. His career is chronicled in Robert B. Weide's Mort Sahl: The Loyal Opposition (1989).

== Early life and education ==
Sahl was born on May 11, 1927, in Montreal, Quebec, Canada, the only child of Jewish parents. His father, Harry Sahl, came from an immigrant family on New York City's Lower East Side, and hoped to become a Broadway playwright. Harry had met his wife, Dorothy (Schwartz), when she responded to an advertisement he placed in a poetry magazine. Unable to break into the writing field, they moved to Canada where he owned a tobacco store in Montreal.

Sahl's family later relocated to Los Angeles, where his father, unable to become a Hollywood writer, worked as a clerk and court reporter for the FBI. Sahl notes, "My dad was disappointed in his dreams and he distrusted that world for me." Sahl went to Belmont High School in Los Angeles, where he wrote for the school's newspaper. Actor Richard Crenna was a classmate.

When the U.S. entered World War II after the Japanese attack on Pearl Harbor, Sahl, then aged 14, joined the school's Reserve Officers' Training Corps (ROTC). He won a medal for marksmanship and an American Legion "Americanism award". Wanting to express his patriotism, he wore his ROTC uniform to school and in public and, when he turned fifteen, he dropped out of high school to join the United States Army by lying about his age. His mother tracked him down and brought him back home two weeks later after she had revealed his true age.

After Sahl graduated from high school, his father tried to get him into West Point and had received his Congressman's help, but Sahl had by then already enlisted in the United States Army Air Forces. He was later stationed in Alaska with the 93rd Air Depot Group. In the military, however, he resisted the discipline and authoritarian control it exerted over his life. He expressed his nonconformity by growing a beard and refusing to wear a cap as required. He also wrote articles for a small newspaper criticizing the military that resulted in his being penalized with three months of KP duty. In an interview, Sahl stated he found his military experience a good one, that he described as "spiritual".

Sahl was discharged in 1947 and enrolled in Compton College, followed by the University of Southern California. He received a B.S. degree in 1950 with majors in traffic engineering and city management. He continued with a masters program, but dropped out to become an actor and playwright.

== Career ==
=== Breaking into comedy ===
Between 1950 and 1953 Sahl attempted to get jobs as a stand-up comedian in about 30 nightclubs in Los Angeles, but with no success. NBC, where he auditioned, told him he would never succeed as a comedian. He offered to perform free during intermissions for the chance to show his talent. He recalled of that period: "Despite all the folklore about the faith of friends in the struggling young artist, my friends constantly discouraged me." He and a friend then rented an old theater, which they called Theater X, for "experimental," and he began writing and staging one-act plays. One of his plays was titled Nobody Trusted the Truth. Unable to attract a large enough audience, they eventually closed the theater.

For income, Sahl began doing odd jobs and writing. He worked as a used car salesman and a messenger, and wrote a novel, which went unpublished, and short stories. He went to New York hoping to sell his plays, but only managed to earn about eighteen dollars a week. He recalled ... "I couldn't get a thing going. I was working on a novel, I was out of work, and I was out of gas." As a result, he decided to try something different, by performing his plays as monologues. He felt it would be easier to do his monologue on stage instead of trying to sell it to others. "I knew that if I was going to get anything done, I'd have to do it myself," he says. He returned to Los Angeles, where he appeared at some clubs, but his new style of monologue comedy received little attention.

In 1953 he began dating Sue Babior. When she moved to Berkeley to study at the University of California, Sahl hitchhiked there to be with her. He spent his time auditing classes and hanging out at local coffee houses. For income, he wrote for a few avant-garde publications. He slept in the back seat of a friend's car; Babior was living with roommates. "Things were simple then," he said. "... All we had to worry about was the destiny of man." He felt at home in the San Francisco Bay Area, commenting, "I was 'born' in San Francisco." He stated that the three years he lived in Berkeley were a valuable experience.

Sahl sought clubs where he could perform stand-up, and Babior suggested he audition for the hungry i, a nightclub in San Francisco. Its owner, Enrico Banducci, took an immediate liking to Sahl's comedy style and offered him a job at $75 a week (about $1,500 in 2026 money), which became his first steady job as a stand-up comedian.

Word about Sahl's satirical comedy act spread quickly. He received good reviews from influential newspaper columnist Herb Caen. The reviews gave Sahl instant credibility: "I don't know where Mr. Sahl came from, but I'm glad he's here," Caen wrote after watching the show. Caen began inviting his own friends, such as film comedians Danny Kaye and Eddie Cantor, to watch Sahl's performances. Cantor took him "under his wing" and gave him suggestions.By the end of Sahl's first year at the hungry i, he was earning $3,000 a week (about $60,000 a week in 2026 money) and performing to full houses. Later in his career, he said, "I'd be washing cars if it weren't for Enrico."

=== Nightclub shows and national acclaim ===
After a year at the hungry i, Sahl began appearing at other clubs, including the Black Orchid and Mister Kelly's in Chicago, the Crescendo in Los Angeles, and the Village Vanguard and The Blue Angel nightclub in New York City. Some of the clubs had never had a stand-up comedian; Sahl had to break in as a new kind of act. "I had to build up my own network of places to play," he said.

He was the best thing I ever saw. There was a need for revolution, everybody was ready for revolution, but some guy had to come along who could perform the revolution and be great. Mort was the one. He was the tip of the iceberg. Underneath were all the other people who came along: Lenny Bruce, Nichols & May, all the Second City. Mort was the vanguard of the group.

— Woody Allen

Celebrities saw his shows after they heard about the "new phenomenon," referring to Sahl's unique style of comedy. Woody Allen, who saw his show at the Blue Angel in 1954, commented that "he was suddenly this great genius that appeared who revolutionized the medium." British comedy actor John Cleese became immediately interested in Sahl's radical style of humor and accorded to Sahl the same level of respect that The Beatles reserved for Elvis Presley.

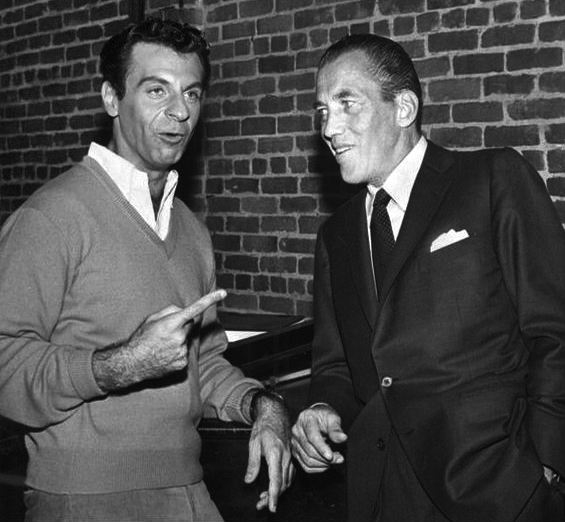
On The Ed Sullivan Show in 1960

Television host Steve Allen, who originated the Tonight Show, said he was "struck by how amateur he seemed," but added that the observation was not meant as a criticism, but as a "compliment". He noted that all the previous successful comics dressed formally, were glib and well-rehearsed, and were always in control of their audiences. Allen said that Sahl's "very un-show business manner was one of the things I liked when I first saw him work."

Sahl dressed casually, with no tie and usually wearing his trademark V-neck campus-style sweater. His stage presence was seen as being "candid and cool, the antithesis of the slick comic," stated theater critic Gerald Nachman. And although Sahl acquired a reputation for being an intellectual comedian, it was an image he disliked and disagreed with: "It was absurd. I was barely a C student," he said. His naturalness on stage was partly due to his preferring improvisation over carefully rehearsed monologues. Sahl explained:

I never found you could write the act. You can't rehearse the audience's responses. You adjust to them every night. I come in with only an outline. You've got to have a spirit of adventure. I follow my instincts and the audience is my jury.

His casual style of stand-up, where he seemed to be one-on-one with his audience, influenced new comedians, including Lenny Bruce and Dick Gregory. Sahl was the least controversial, however, because he dressed and looked "collegiate" and focused on politics, while Bruce confronted sexual and language conventions and Gregory focused on the civil rights movement. After seeing Sahl on stage, Woody Allen, whose writings were often about his personal life, decided to give it a try: "I'd never had the nerve to talk about it before. Then Mort Sahl came along with a whole new style of humor, opening up vistas for people like me."

Commenting on Sahl's monologues, Nachman described him as a "gifted narrator, so good at taking you along on his travels that you didn't quite realize until the show was over that you had been on a labyrinthine journey." The speed with which Sahl gave his monologues was also notable. British film critic Penelope Gilliatt recalled how Sahl's improvisation "goes on a breakneck stammering loop and you think it will never make the circle. It always does." For her it was like watching a circus act: "He freewheels a bike on a high wire tightrope with his brain racing and his hands off the handlebars."

Sahl's popularity "mushroomed like an Atomic cloud during the 50s," says filmmaker Robert B. Weide, adding, "Simply put, Mort Sahl reinvented stand-up comedy." Time magazine in 1960 published a cover story about him and his rise to fame, in which they described him as "the best of the New Comedians [and] the first notable American political satirist since Will Rogers." Along with his nightclub performances, he appeared in some films and on television shows, including his network debut on The NBC Comedy Hour in May 1956. He was one of the interim hosts on The Tonight Show following Jack Paar's departure as the network waited for Johnny Carson to become available.

His audience had also widened to include not only students and a "hip" public, but now even noted politicians sought out his shows. Some became friends, such as presidential candidate John F. Kennedy, who asked him to prepare a bank of political jokes he could use at public functions. Kennedy liked his style of political satire and what he described as Sahl's "relentless pursuit of everybody." Adlai Stevenson and Hubert Humphrey were fans, Humphrey stating that "whenever there is a political bloat, Mort sticks a pin in it." Sahl considered Ronald Reagan one of his closest friends.

They valued the fact that he stayed current and took material from major newspapers and magazines. He kept his material fresh, wrote few notes, and entertained his audiences by presenting otherwise serious news with his brand of humor. He was not fond of television news, however, which he blamed in 1960 for "spoon-feeding" the public, and was therefore responsible for the "corruption and ignorance that may sink this country."

As a result of Sahl's popularity, besides getting on the cover of Time, he also became the first comedian to make a record album, the first to do college concerts, and was the first comedian to win a Grammy.

=== Declining career in 1960s ===
Once Kennedy was in office, Sahl returned to his policy of making jokes about the incumbent with Sahl saying, “If you were the only person left on the planet, I would have to attack you". JFK's father Joseph Kennedy made a few calls, Sahl’s club bookings began to dry up. One morning, Banducci went to the Hungry i which was still booking Sahl and found the doors chained and padlocked by the IRS in demand of back taxes. “My so-called liberal supporters have all moved in with the establishment,” he said from the stage at one preview. “The same people who like jokes about John Foster Dulles and Goldwater suddenly freeze when they hear satirical humor about Vietnam or the war on poverty. That’s my job”.

In those days Sahl liked to say, “I have only a few months to tell these jokes before they become treason,” but the line would come back to haunt him after Kennedy took office. Sahl went to town on the Bay of Pigs invasion; he pilloried Kennedy with no less relish than he had Eisenhower. In Heartland he remembers the president coming to see him at the Crescendo in Hollywood: “Kennedy was in the audience in the back booth. And I said, ‘I have a bulletin. Marilyn Monroe is going to marry Adlai Stevenson. Now, Kennedy can be jealous of him twice.’ And I heard a fist come down on the table and a voice in New England dialect saying, ‘God damn it.'” Sahl began getting reports through his agent, Milt Ebbins, that the Kennedys felt betrayed and wanted him to cool it. “They kept telling me that Utopia was here, that my people were finally in,” he told the Saturday Evening Post in 1964. “I don’t think my people are ever going to be in.” Finally Ebbins and Peter Lawford delivered an ultimatum from Joseph: “The ambassador says if you don’t cooperate, you’ll never work again in the United States.” Before long the offers began to taper off. Sahl remembers Shelley Davis, who’d just bought the Crescendo, warning him, “I’ve been told that the White House would be offended if I hired you and I’d be audited on my income tax.”.

— J.R. Jones, Political Suicide August 6, 1998

Following Kennedy's assassination in 1963, Sahl's interest in who was responsible was so great that he became a deputized member of District Attorney of New Orleans Jim Garrison's team to investigate the assassination. In 1968 he used his influence to get Garrison a spot on The Tonight Show Starring Johnny Carson and also arranged for him to be interviewed by Playboy. Garrison, in his 1988 book On the Trail of the Assassins, thanked him for his "constant and crucial advice and support". Warren Commission critic, Mark Lane, was invited on Sahl's talk show multiple times.

As a result of this interest, Sahl's comedy would often reflect his politics and included readings and commentary about the Warren Commission Report, of which he consistently disputed the accuracy. He alienated much of his audience, was effectively blacklisted, and more of his planned shows were cancelled. His income dropped from $1 million to $13,000 by 1964. According to Nachman, the extensive focus on the Kennedy assassination details was Sahl's undoing and wrecked his career. Sahl later admitted that "there's never been anything that had a stronger impact on my life than this issue," but added that he nonetheless "thought it was a wonderful quest."

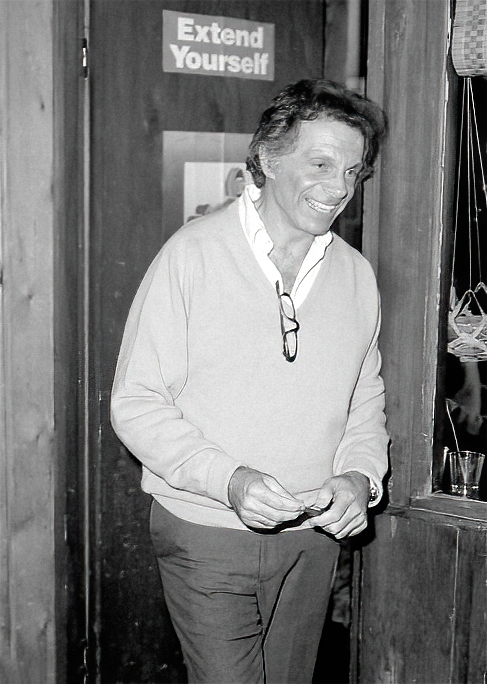
Mort Sahl in 1985

=== Partial comeback ===
Mort Sahl has charted one of the most precipitous courses in American entertainment for last thirty years and has gone from celebrity to internal exile. There was no precedent for what he did. There were no prototypes. He's a genuinely self-created man and a true existential in that sense. Once he passes from the scene, people will begin to lionize him and call him the great American and take to heart all the things he said.

— Los Angeles Times, 1983

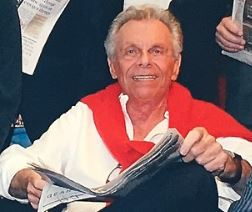
Sahl in 2007

By the 1970s, the rising tide of counterculture eventually fueled Sahl's partial comeback as a veteran comedian, and he was included with the new comedians breaking into the field, such as George Carlin, Lily Tomlin, and Richard Pryor. In the 1980s he headlined for Banducci's new clubs in San Francisco. In the late 1980s he was trying to write screenplays, besides doing sporadic shows around the country. In 1987 he had a successful multiweek run in Australia.

In 1988 Sahl was back in New York City and performed a one-man Off-Broadway show, Mort Sahl's America, which, despite getting good reviews from critics, was not a box office success. The New York Times stated, "History has returned Mort Sahl to the spotlight when he is most needed. His style has an intuitive spontaneity. His presence is tonic." Robert Weide produced a biographical documentary, Mort Sahl: The Loyal Opposition, which ran on PBS in 1989.

Sahl found his previous level of success increasingly difficult to recapture. One Los Angeles Times critic wrote, "Sahl is a man with a country but not a stage." A number of television specials gave him a venue to perform in front of live audiences. Beginning in November 1991, the Monitor Channel broadcast a series of eight shows called Mort Sahl Live .

From the 1990s on he performed, but less often and mostly in theaters and college auditoriums. When Woody Allen saw him perform in 2001 at one of his rare New York club appearances, Allen told him, "this is crazy – you should be working all the time." Allen then called his manager Jack Rollins: "Listen, this guy is hilarious. We gotta bring him to New York." Sahl then did shows at Joe's Pub in Manhattan to standing-room only audiences.

In 2008, Sahl performed at B.B. King's Blues Club & Grill on 42nd Street with Woody Allen, Elaine May, and Dick Cavett in attendance.

Sahl was ranked #40 on Comedy Central's list of the 100 greatest stand-up comedians of all time, ranked between Billy Crystal and Jon Stewart. In 2003 he received the Fifth Annual Alan King Award in American Jewish Humor from the National Foundation for Jewish Culture. In 2011, the Library of Congress placed his 1955 recording, At Sunset, on the National Recording Registry.

=== Satire comedy style ===
Sahl's humor was based on current events, especially politics, which led Milton Berle to describe him as "one of the greatest political satirists of all time." His trademark persona was to enter the stage with a newspaper in hand, casually dressed in a V-neck sweater. He would often recite some news stories combined with satire. He was dubbed "Will Rogers with fangs" by Time magazine in 1960.

Sahl would discuss people or events almost as if he were reporting them for the first time, and would digress into related stories or his own experiences. TV executive Roger Ailes said he saw him read the paper one day and after a few hours Sahl got up onstage with an entire evening's worth of new material. "With no writers, he just did what he had seen in the afternoon paper. He was a genius."

Sahl's presentation of news commentary as a form of social satire created a wide assortment of celebrity and political fans, including Adlai Stevenson, Marlene Dietrich, S.J. Perelman, Saul Bellow, and Leonard Bernstein. Arthur M. Schlesinger, Jr. said his popularity was due to the public's "yearning for youth, irreverence, trenchancy, satire, [and] a clean break with the past." And Steve Allen introduced him on one of his shows as being "the only real political philosopher we have in modern comedy."

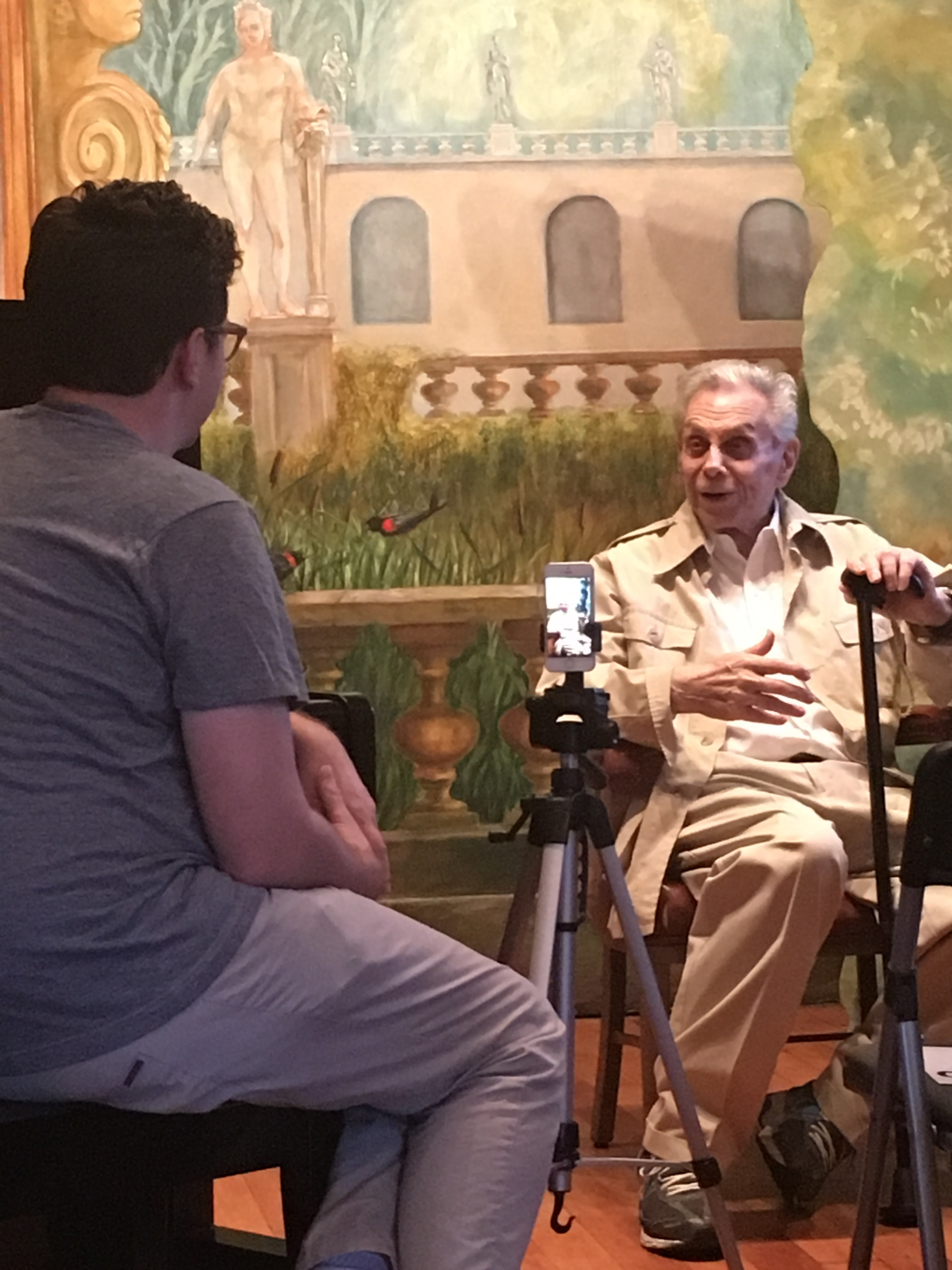
Sahl performing in 2016

Combined with his improvisational skill, Sahl's naturalness was also considered unique for a stage performer. Woody Allen notes that other comics were jealous of Sahl's stage persona and did not understand how he could perform by simply talking to the audience. Nachman stated that the "mere idea of a stand-up comic talking about the real world was in itself revolutionary ... [and] the comedians who followed him – Lenny Bruce, Woody Allen, Dick Gregory, Phyllis Diller, Shelley Berman, Jonathan Winters – were cast in a familiar nightclub mold."

== In popular culture ==
In the September 28, 1960 Peanuts comic strip, Schroeder is reading aloud to Lucy from a biography on his favorite composer, Ludwig van Beethoven, describing his idol as someone who "would sometimes startle people in public places," and "flew out in anger against all that was petty, dull, or greedy in men. ... Often, however, his scorn would turn to high hilarity and humorous jests." Lucy asks, "Are you reading about Beethoven or Mort Sahl?"

== Personal life ==
Sahl was married three times. He wedded Sue Babior in 1955; the marriage ended in divorce less than three years later. In the early 1960s his steady girlfriend was Tippi Hedren. Sahl also dated Dyan Cannon and Julie Newmar.

In 1967, he married actress and model China Lee and they divorced in 1991. They had one son, Mort Sahl Jr., who died in 1996, aged 19, from an unknown drug-related reaction.

In 1997, he married Kenslea Ann Motter; they divorced around 2009. He regretted the end of their marriage and said "I'm sorry I divorced Kenslea; I'm still in love with my wife. If you love a woman it'll make her a better woman."

In 1976, Sahl wrote an autobiography called Heartland.

In June 2007, a number of star comedians, including George Carlin and Jonathan Winters, gave Sahl an 80th birthday tribute.

In 2008, Sahl moved from Los Angeles to Mill Valley, California, a suburb of San Francisco, where he became friends with comedian Robin Williams, who lived nearby.

Until the COVID-19 pandemic in 2020, Sahl worked every Thursday night at the Throckmorton Theater in Mill Valley, California taking questions from a live audience and from Periscope/Twitter.

Sahl died of natural causes at his home in Mill Valley on October 26, 2021, at age 94.

== Discography ==
=== Performance albums ===
- At Sunset, Fantasy Records (recorded 1955, released 1958)
- The Future Lies Ahead, Verve Records (1958)
- Mort Sahl: 1960 or Look Forward in Anger, Verve Records MG V-15004 (1959)
- At the hungry i, Verve Records (1960)
- The Next President, Verve Records (1960)
- A Way of Life, Verve Records (1960)
- The New Frontier, Reprise Records (1961)
- On Relationships, Reprise Records (1961)
- Anyway... Onward, Mercury Records (1967)
- "Sing a Song of Watergate... Apocryphal of Lie!", GNP Crescendo Records (1973)
- Mort Sahl's America, Dove Audio (1996)

=== Compilation album ===
- Great Moments of Comedy with Mort Sahl Verve Records (1965)

== Selected filmography ==
- In Love and War (1958) as Danny Krieger
- Richard Diamond, Private Detective (CBS-TV 1959) as Himself
- All the Young Men (1960) as Cpl. Crane
- Johnny Cool (1963) as Ben Morrow
- Doctor, You've Got to Be Kidding! (1967) as Dan Ruskin
- Don't Make Waves (1967) as Sam Lingonberry
- hungry i reunion (1981) as Himself, documentary
- Inside the Third Reich (1982) (TV) as Werner Finck
- Nothing Lasts Forever (1984) as Uncle Mort
- Jonathan Winters: On the Ledge (1987) as Himself, TV special
- Mort Sahl: The Loyal Opposition (1989) as Himself, American Masters documentary
- The World of Jewish Humor (1990) as Himself, documentary
- Looking for Lenny (2011) as Himself, documentary
- When Comedy Went to School (2013) as Himself, documentary
- Max Rose (2013) as Jack

== Bibliography ==
- Curtis, James (May 2, 2017). Last Man Standing: Mort Sahl and the Birth of Modern Comedy. Univ. Press of Mississippi. ISBN 9781496811998.
- Sahl, Mort (1976). Heartland. San Diego, CA: Harcourt Brace Jovanovich. ISBN 978-0-1513-9820-1.
