= Miss Tabasco =

Beauty pageant in Tabasco, Mexico

- Formation: 2016
- Type: Beauty pageant
- Headquarters: Mexico City
- Location: Mexico
- Local Coordinator: Alejandro Gómez & Manuel Torres

Miss Tabasco is a state-level contest in the state of Tabasco, Mexico, which selects the state representative for the national contest Miss México, thus aspiring to represent the country internationally on one of the platforms offered.

The state organization has achieved the following results since 2016:

- Winner: 1 (2025)
- Top 10/11: 2 (2017, 2021)
- Top 16: 1 (2023)
- Unplaced: 3 (2016, 2018, 2019)

== National Queens ==
- Esmeralda Meza - Miss México Cosmo 2026

== Titleholders ==
The following are the names of the annual winners of Miss Tabasco, listed in ascending order, as well as their results during the national Miss México pageant. State queens who represented the country in a current or past franchise of the national organization are also highlighted in a specific color.

Current Franchises:

- Competed at Miss World.
- Competed at Miss Supranational.
- Competed at Miss Cosmo.
- Competed at Miss Elite.
- Competed at Top Model of the World.
- Competed at Reina Internacional del Café.
- Competed at Reina Mundial del Banano.
- Competed at Miss Continentes Unidos.
- Competed at Miss Global City.

Former Franchises:

- Competed at Miss Grand International.
- Competed at Miss Costa Maya International.

| Year | Titleholder | Hometown | Placement | Special Award | Notes |
|---|---|---|---|---|---|
| 2026 | TBA | | | | |
| 2025 | Esmeralda Guadalupe Meza Justiniano | Querétaro | Miss México Cosmo | Best National Costume; Best Skin | Will compete at Miss Cosmo 2026; Top 12 at Miss México Cosmo 2025; Top 16 at Miss Universe México 2024; Miss Universe Querétaro 2024; Top 16 at Mexicana Universal 2023; Mexicana Universal Querétaro 2022; Was born and raised in Querétaro |
| 2024 | In 2024, due to changes in the dates of the national pageant, the election of the state queens was postponed for one year. | | | | |
| 2023 | Yajari Brizuela Estrada | San Julián | Top 16 | Miss Multimedia | Competed at Miss Model of the World 2025; Miss Model of the World México 2025; Top 16 at Miss México Top Model of the World 2024; Top 6 at Mexicana Universal Jalisco 2021; Competed at Miss Teen Earth México 2018; Miss Teen Earth Jalisco 2018; Señorita San Julián 2018 |
| 2022 | In 2022, due to changes in the dates of the national pageant, the election of the state queens was postponed for one year. | | | | |
| 2021 | Emmanuelle Guzmán Torres | Villahermosa | Top 10 | - | Competed at Miss México Elite 2022 |
| 2020 | In 2020, due to the contingency of COVID-19 there was a lag in the year of the state contest | | | | |
| 2019 | Gildy Guillermina Reyes Colorado (Resigned) | Frontera | Did not Compete | - | Top 10 at Flor Tabasco 2017; Competed at Mexicana Universal Ciudad de México 2017; Miss United Countries México 2017; Top 8 at Miss Earth México 2016; Miss Earth Tabasco 2016; Competed at Nuestra Belleza Tabasco 2014 |
| 2019 | Paloma Paulina Zurita Ventura (Assumed) | Puebla | - | - | Princess at Reinado Internacional del Joropo 2021; Reina del Joropo México 2021; 2nd Runner-up at Miss Puebla 2021; Was born and raised in Puebla |
| 2018 | Andrea Aysa Valenzuela | Emiliano Zapata | - | Miss Multimedia | 4th Runner-up at Miss México Grand 2019; 1st Runner-up at Flor Tabasco 2017 |
| 2017 | Flora Elena Magdaleno Campos | Paraíso | Top 10 | Miss Multimedia; Head to Head | 2nd Runner-up at Flor Tabasco 2016; Competed at Nuestra Belleza Tabasco 2016 |
| 2016 | Yussihey Litzahally Vidal Celorio | Jonuta | - | - | Flor Tabasco 2013; Miss Earth México-Air 2011; Miss Earth Tabasco 2011; Reina Turismo Tabasco 2010 |

== See also ==
- Mexicana Universal Tabasco
