= Laurence Wright =

American composer

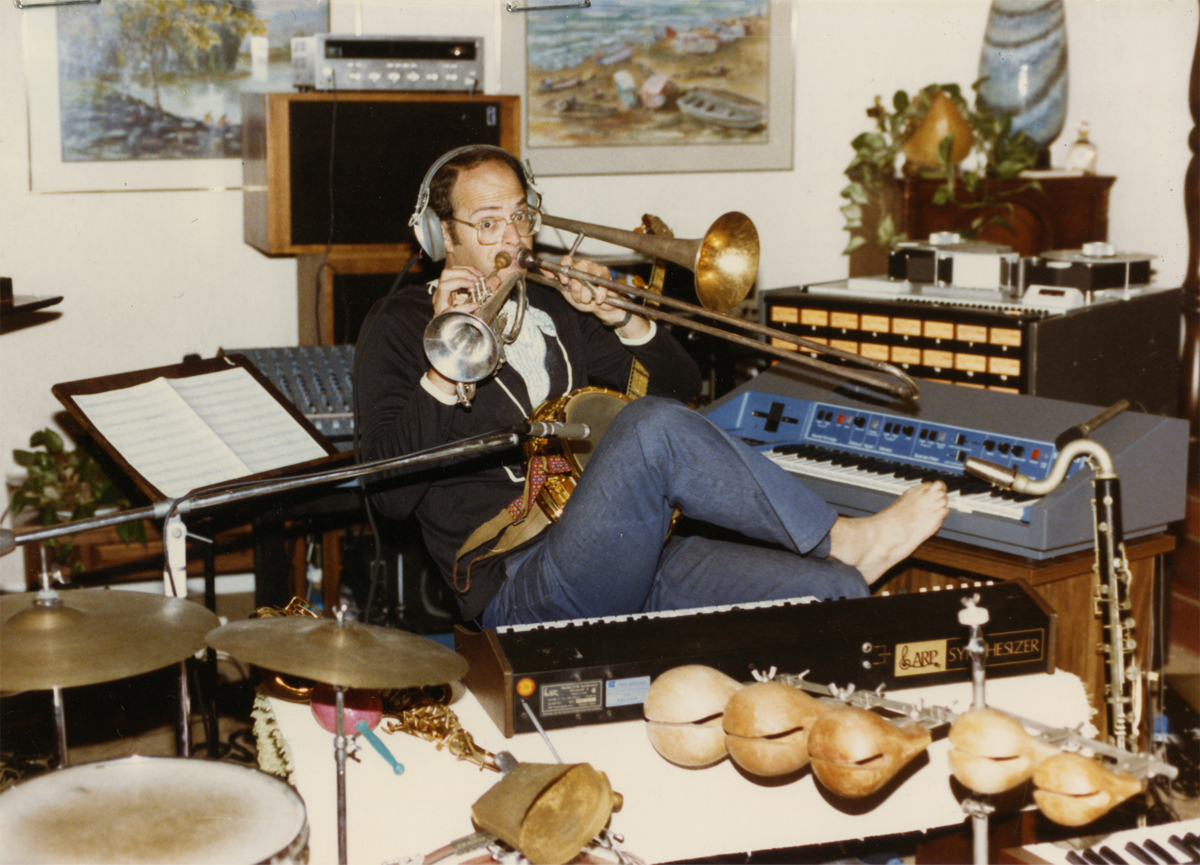
Laurence Wright

Laurence Wright is a music composer who has composed film scores for award-winning short films as well as attractions for museums, heritage attractions, World's Fairs and theme parks.

== Education ==
Wright was an early graduate of the then experimental art college, California Institute of the Arts (CALARTS). As one of the first students of the prestigious arts program, Wright graduated in 1972 with a Bachelor in Fine Arts in Film and Video.

== Early Career and Awards ==
Wright's early involvement in film score composition began with composing the original music score for the award-winning short film, "Model Railroading Unlimited," commissioned by Model Railroader magazine and Released in 1975. The film, part documentary and part disaster movie spoof, was narrated by Hans Conried and featured legendary Disney Studios animator, Ward Kimball in a guest starring role. The film received several awards for the short film category, including "Best of Category" at the San Francisco International Film Festival, the "Chris Statuette" from the Columbus International Film & Video Festival, the Golden Eagle Award at the CINE Awards in Washington DC, the "Bronze Medal" for the International Film and TV Festival of New York and the "Best of Category" for the Photographic Society of America's 46th Annual American International Film Festival.

Following his music composition for the model railroad film, Laurence Wright went on to compose the music score for a 1979 short educational film entitled, "Meadowlark Lemon Presents the World," which featured legendary Harlem Globetrotter, Meadowlark Lemon. The educational short film, which teaches grade school children the importance of mapping and geography, remains in distribution.

In 1980, Laurence Wright performed both the role of actor and the composer of the theme music for the 1980 cult film Closet Cases of the Nerd Kind. This film, a parody of Steven Spielberg's 1977 box office blockbuster film Close Encounters of the Third Kind, Closet Cases remains in distribution through Pyramid Media, and can be found readily on the internet through IMDB and YouTube.

== Theme Park Scores ==
Wright's early work with theme parks included his composing the music for several of the attractions featured at the General Motors' World of Motion pavilion, one of the original attractions to open in 1982 at the Orlando, Florida Walt Disney World EPCOT theme park. The TransCenter portion of World of Motion, designed by award-winning experience designer Bob Rogers (designer) and the design team BRC Imagination Arts, offered educational attractions which included prototype cars such as the Lean Machine in the Dreamer's Workshop and a show called The Water Engine, which pits nine animated characters associated with various and alternate fuel-systems in a debate over which motor design should be used to power cars. Here, in TransCenter, Wright composed the music for the attractions: "Bird and the Robot," "The Water Engine," "Lean Machine," and "Torture Test." The diversity of each composition is a testimony to Wright's broad range as a composer. His music for the attraction, "Bird and the Robot" featured a funky vaudevillian flavor, while the music for the attraction "Torture Test" was recorded in a garage using sounds made by a Cadillac automobile, and the music for the attraction "The Water Engine," was recorded at London's famous Abbey Road Studios, and performed by the prestigious 90-piece Royal Philharmonic Orchestra.

== Educational Attraction Scores ==
In addition to his work with theme park attractions, Laurence Wright also produced musical scores for several educational attractions. Of these are included the attractions: "The Wizard of Change" and "Our American Crossroads." The attraction, "The Wizard of Change," presented to the general public at both the Chicago Museum of Science and Industry and the California Science Center, was accompanied by a soundscape composed by Wright. The exhibit, the first of its kind to employ the three-dimensional theatrical effects "Holavision" presentation, combines film, effects and Wright's musical score to trace the history of the manufacturing process.

Wright also composed the musical score to accompany the presentation of a fictional "history-based" story called "Our American Crossroads," which was a traveling exhibit re-purposed from the original 1936 General Motors "Parade of Progress," originally featuring GM Futurliner traveling exhibit vehicles. The attraction presented a narrated scale model of a small town which would mechanically transition with historically significant milestones, so as to reveal the improvements brought about by the automobile age.

== Album ==
In 2010 Wright released an album, entitled "Ocarina Man," which features some of his early film scores. The title of the 2-CD set is named for the woodwind instrument frequently incorporated into Wright's soundtracks.

Some of the music featured on the CD include sessions composed and performed entirely by Wright, as well as his compositions that were recorded at London's Abbey Road Studios, and performed by the 90-piece Royal Philharmonic Orchestra.
