= Muscle Beach =

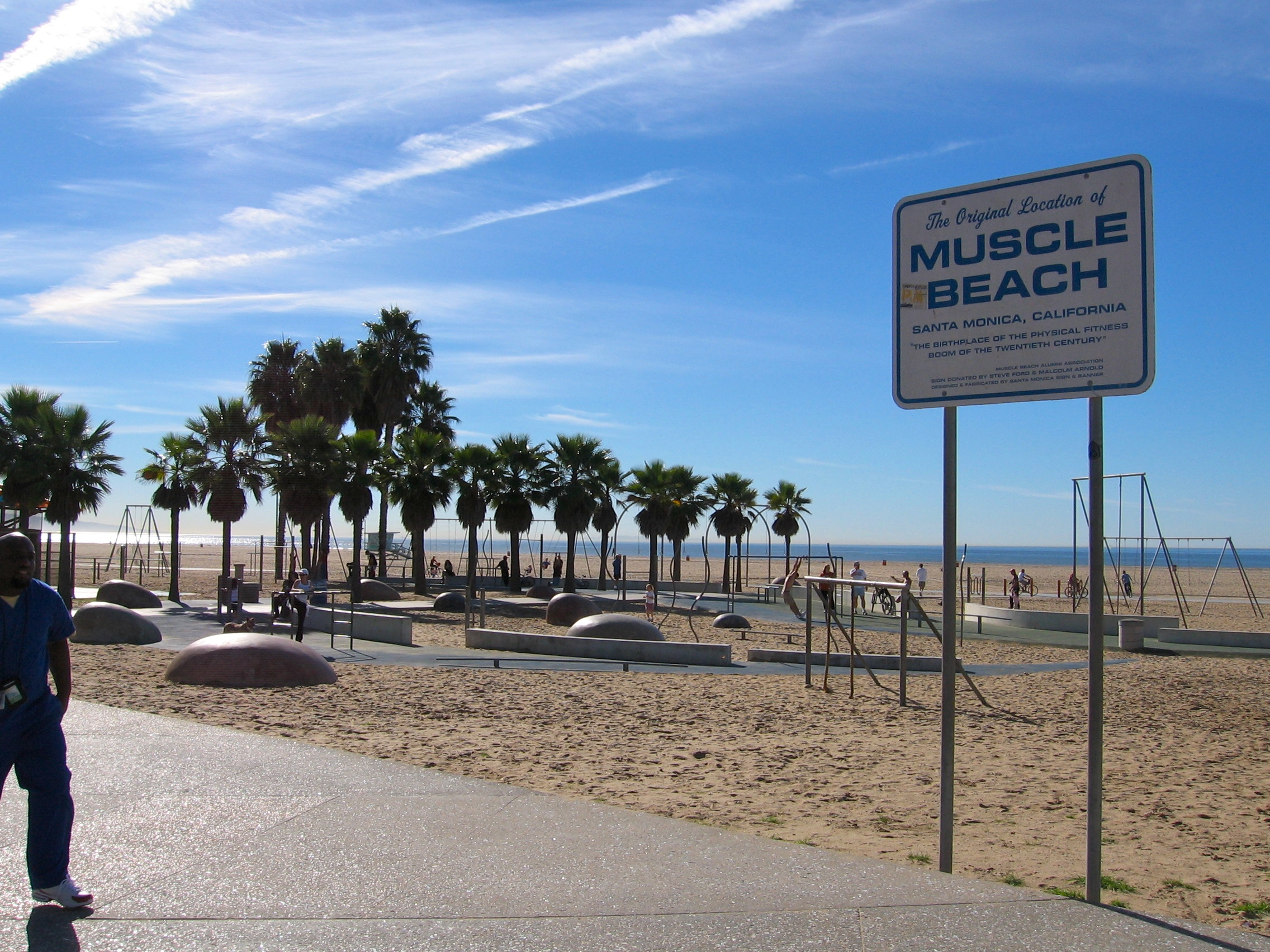
- Original Muscle Beach next to the Santa Monica Pier
- Interactive map of Muscle Beach
- 34.0084425°N 118.494603°W
- Location: Los Angeles County, California, U.S.

History
- Founded: 1934

Site notes
- Governing body: California Department of Parks and Recreation

Muscle Beach is the birthplace of the United States physical fitness boom, which started in 1934 with predominantly gymnastics activities on the south side of the Santa Monica Pier. Muscle Beach Venice is the contemporary title of the outdoor weightlifting platform constructed in Venice, California, a distinct neighborhood in the city of Los Angeles, 18 years after Muscle Beach was established.

== History ==
=== Original Muscle Beach ===
A man performs a handstand on a high bar at the original Muscle Beach, 1955

Muscle Beach dates back to the 1930s when the New Deal agency Works Progress Administration (WPA) installed exercise equipment immediately south of the Santa Monica Pier in Santa Monica, California. Popular gymnastic and acrobatic exhibitions were routinely held there on city-provided equipment. A platform on the beach with weight lifting equipment provided a workout area for such famous bodybuilders as Vic Tanny, Jack LaLanne, and Joe Gold.

In 1989, the City of Santa Monica officially dedicated the original Muscle Beach and today it serves gymnasts, acrobats and youth with an extensive gymnastics training area. Meanwhile, the adjacent City of Los Angeles Recreation and Parks Department has continued the primary barbell, weightlifting and bodybuilding aspects, and events of the original Muscle Beach fame at the Venice weight pen. In 1987, the City of Los Angeles officially dedicated "Muscle Beach Venice" with the added word of "Venice" in the title to distinguish it from the original "Muscle Beach" in Santa Monica.

=== Muscle Beach Venice ===
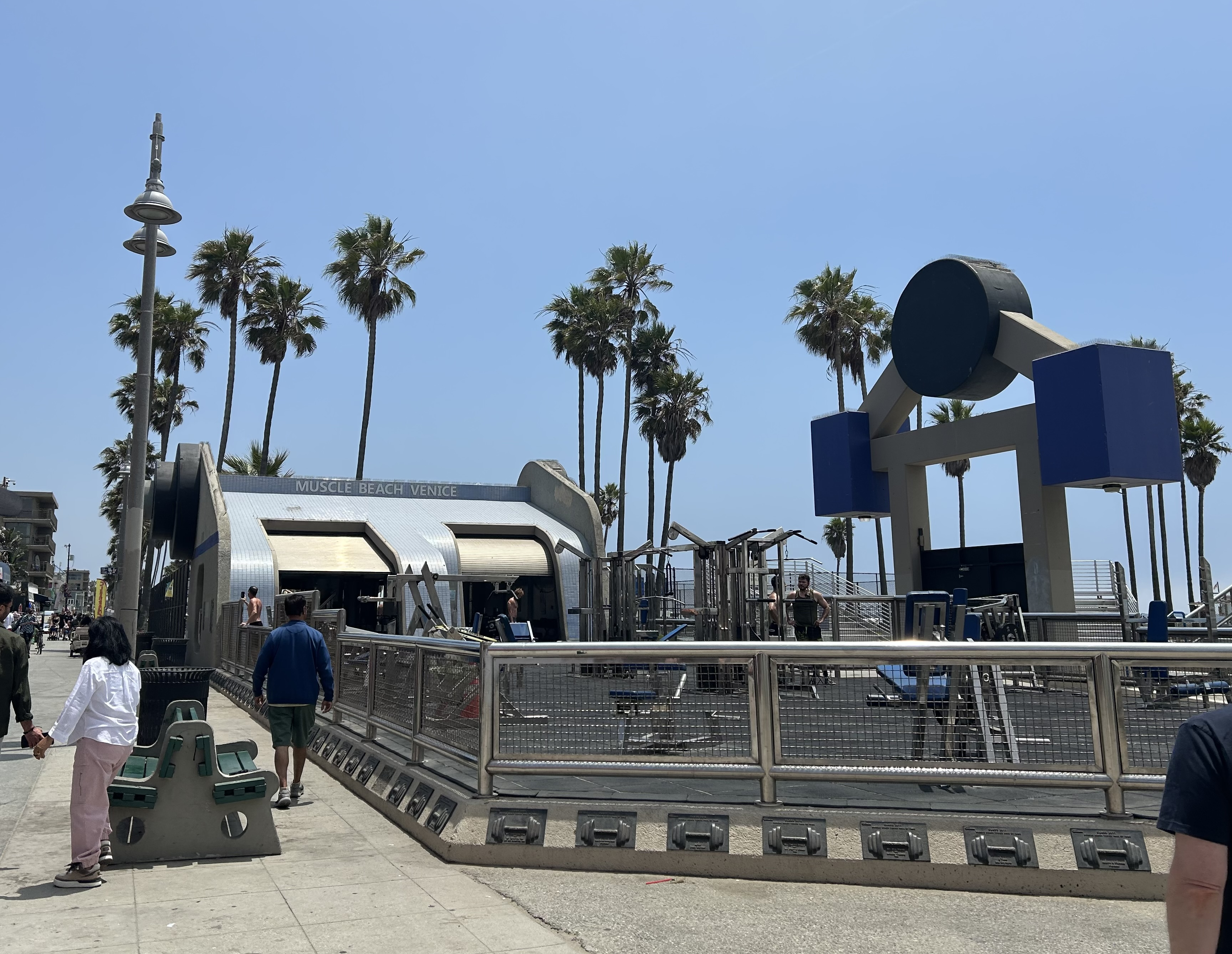
Muscle Beach, Venice

Muscle Beach Venice was officially titled in 1987 by the City of Los Angeles with the distinguishing name "Venice" added to the location to honor the original Santa Monica site.

By the 1950s, Muscle Beach established worldwide fame and helped to popularize and bring legitimacy to physical culture with acrobatics and bodybuilding.

Today it is an open playground with a gated area that encloses weightlifting equipment. The second area is a sand box with gymnastic, rope climbing, and acrobatic bars. The city charges a fee to use the outdoor gym.

== See also ==
- Physical culture
- Joe Weider, bodybuilder
- Max Yavno, photographer
- Muscle Beach by Ira Wallach
