= Ira Wallach (writer) =

American novelist

Ira Wallach (January 22, 1913 – December 2, 1995) was an American screenwriter and novelist.

Born in New York City and raised in New Rochelle, Wallach served with the U.S. Army in the Pacific Theater of World War II, attaining the rank of sergeant. After briefly attending Cornell University, he went to Palestine and worked in the potash industry. He wrote the novel Muscle Beach and collaborated with Peter Ustinov on the screenplay for Hot Millions. Wallach died of pneumonia.

Filmography:

- Boys' Night Out (1962)
- The Wheeler Dealers (1963)
- Don't Make Waves (1967) (based on the 1959 novel Muscle Beach)
- Hot Millions (1968)
