= Montirón (Lugo) =

Montirón is a unique neighborhood located in the municipality of Lugo, in Galicia, Spain. It is situated on the outskirts of Lugo, a two-thousand-year-old city, also known as the walled city and the City of the Sacrament. It is located southeast of the municipal capital on a promontorio between the Miño and Rato rivers, bordering century-old oak groves (carballeiras) where the forgotten late-19th-century Guitián House is located, alongside green spaces that act as the city's lungs, offering great environmental and aesthetic appeal. Part of this green area belongs to the Terras do Miño Biosphere Reserve.

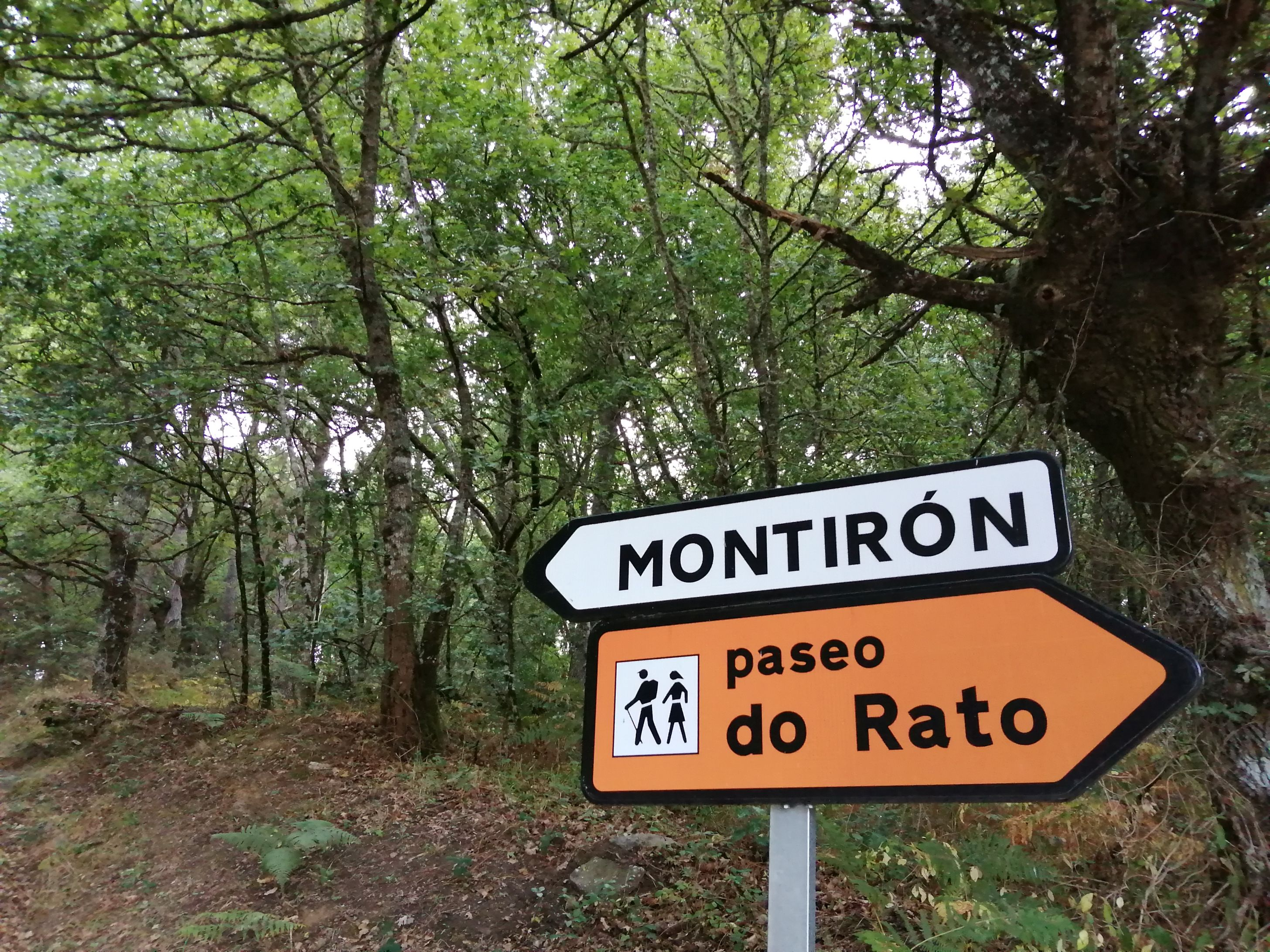

== Toponymy ==
Several theories exist regarding the origin of its toponym, which represents a unique form in Galician toponymy. Studies point to its derivation from Latin words, while others link it to the local terrain and the abundance of iron (hierro) in the area, a connection also reflected in nearby place names such as the Plaza de Aguas Férreas.

== History ==
The area where modern-day Montirón stands was traversed long ago by the inhabitants of the ancient Roman Empire and later by the French troops of Emperor Napoleon. Montirón is crossed by two routes of historical importance:

- Via XIX (the 19th Antonine Itinerary), which connected Lucus Augusti (modern-day Lugo) with Bracara Augusta (Braga in Portugal) during the Roman era. This path passes through the neighboring parish of San Pedro Fiz de Muxa (San Fiz) toward the Roman bridge over the Miño River.

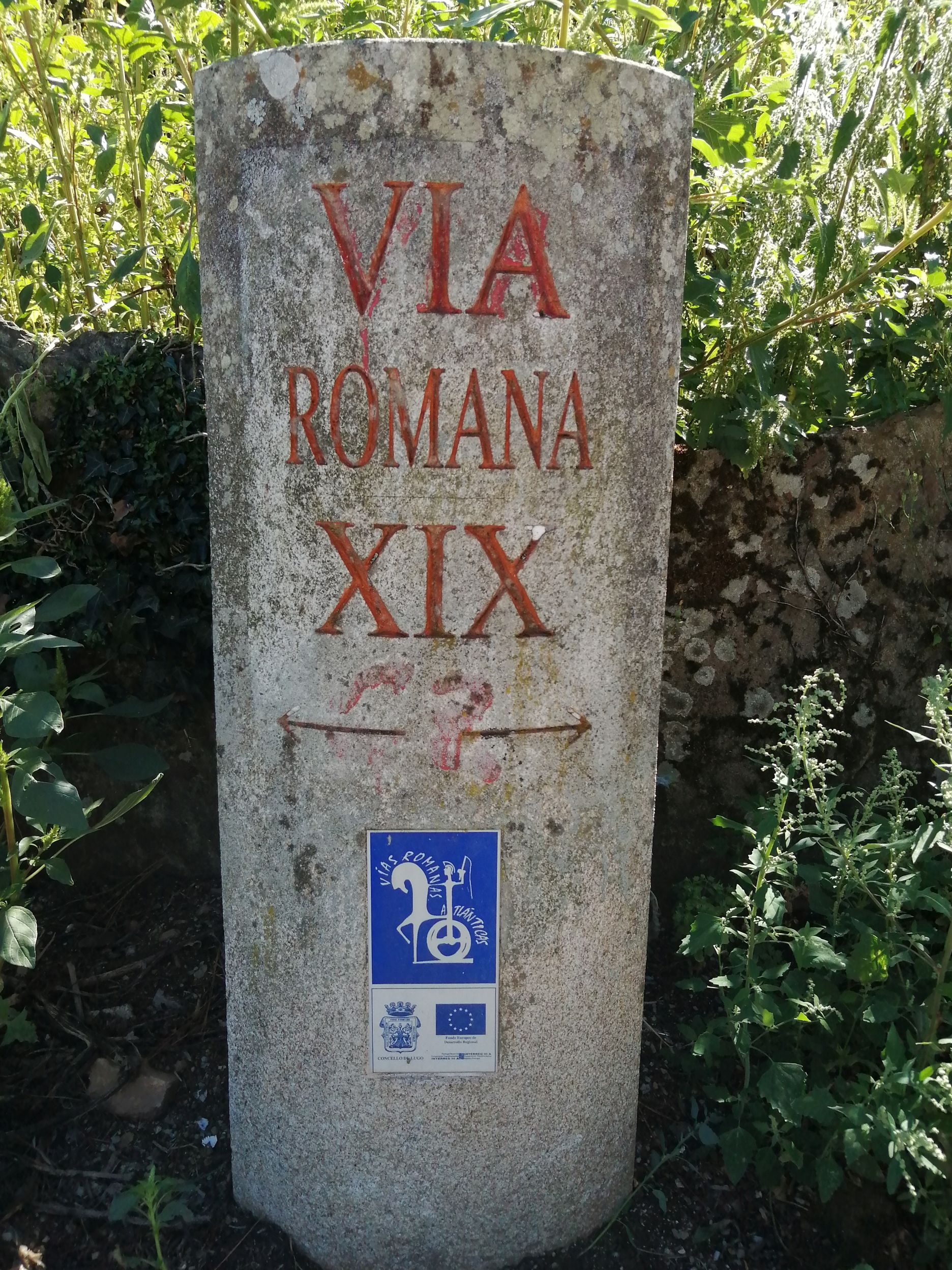
Via XIX Antonina at the height of Illa da Toxa Street

- The Künig Way (Vía Künig), a variant of the French Way of the Camino de Santiago named after the German monk Hermann Künig (author of the medieval pilgrim guide that details this itinerary to Santiago de Compostela), specifically on its 6th stage: O Corgo – Lugo.

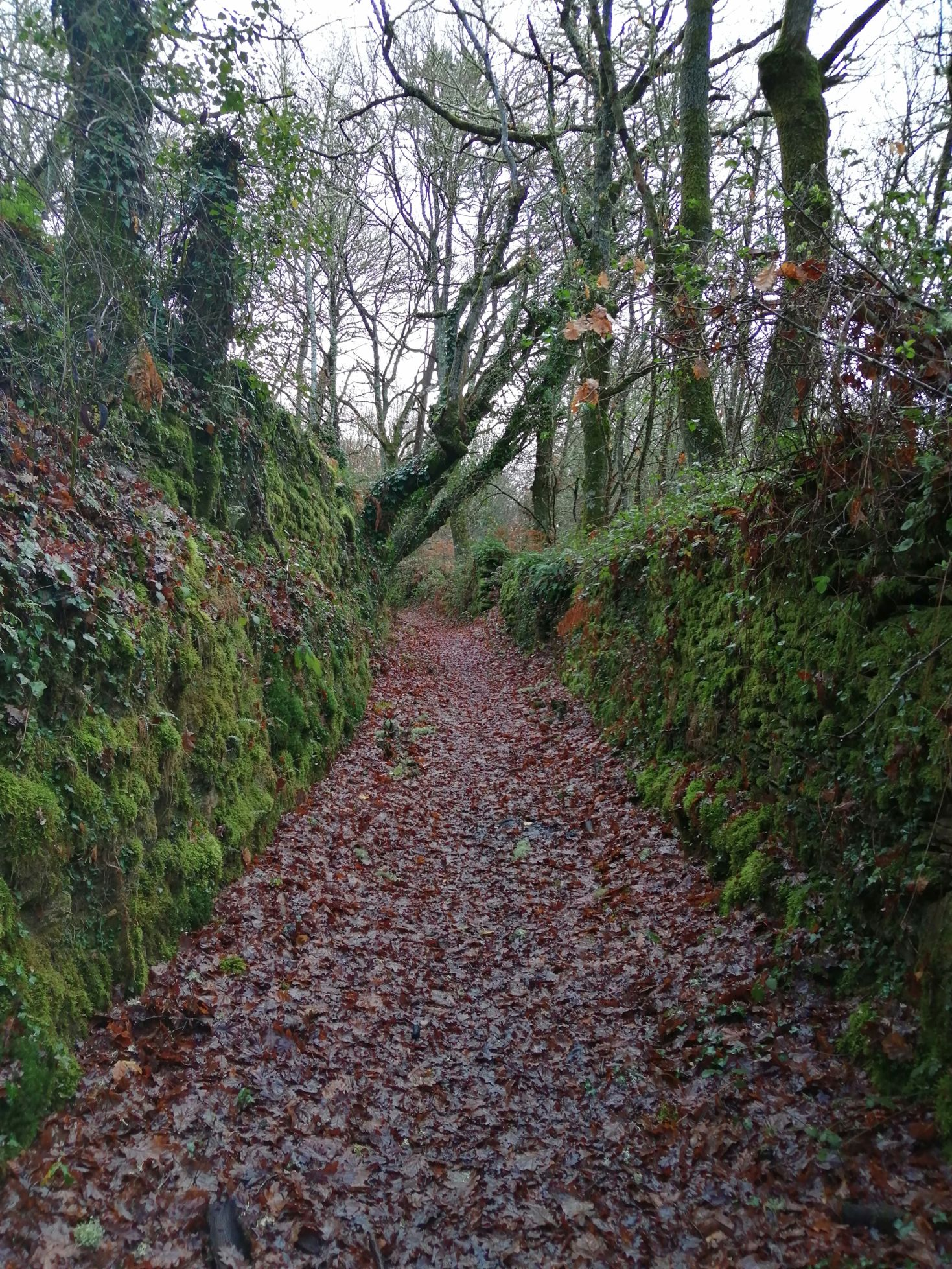
Künig Way near the Paseo do Rato

Additionally, just over a kilometer east of Montirón lies the 100 km mark of the Primitive Way (Camino Primitivo), a Camino de Santiago route originating in Oviedo and ending in Compostela. Conversely, heading in the opposite direction along the old Castile road, one can see the Peto de ánimas (wayside shrine) of A Tolda, located near Roman Via XIX and the Ponte da Tolda.

=== 19th century ===
In the spring of 1809, during the Peninsular War, the French army camped in the area now known as Montirón prior to their retreat from Galicia. The complex of houses and a mill surrounded by ancient oaks, historically known as the Muiño do Tendeiro or Muiño de Eirexe, also dates from the 19th century. Today, these restored structures have been converted into a quiet café and banquet hall with views of the Rato River, as well as the Terras do Miño Interpretation Center, which promotes the surrounding Terras do Miño Biosphere Reserve.

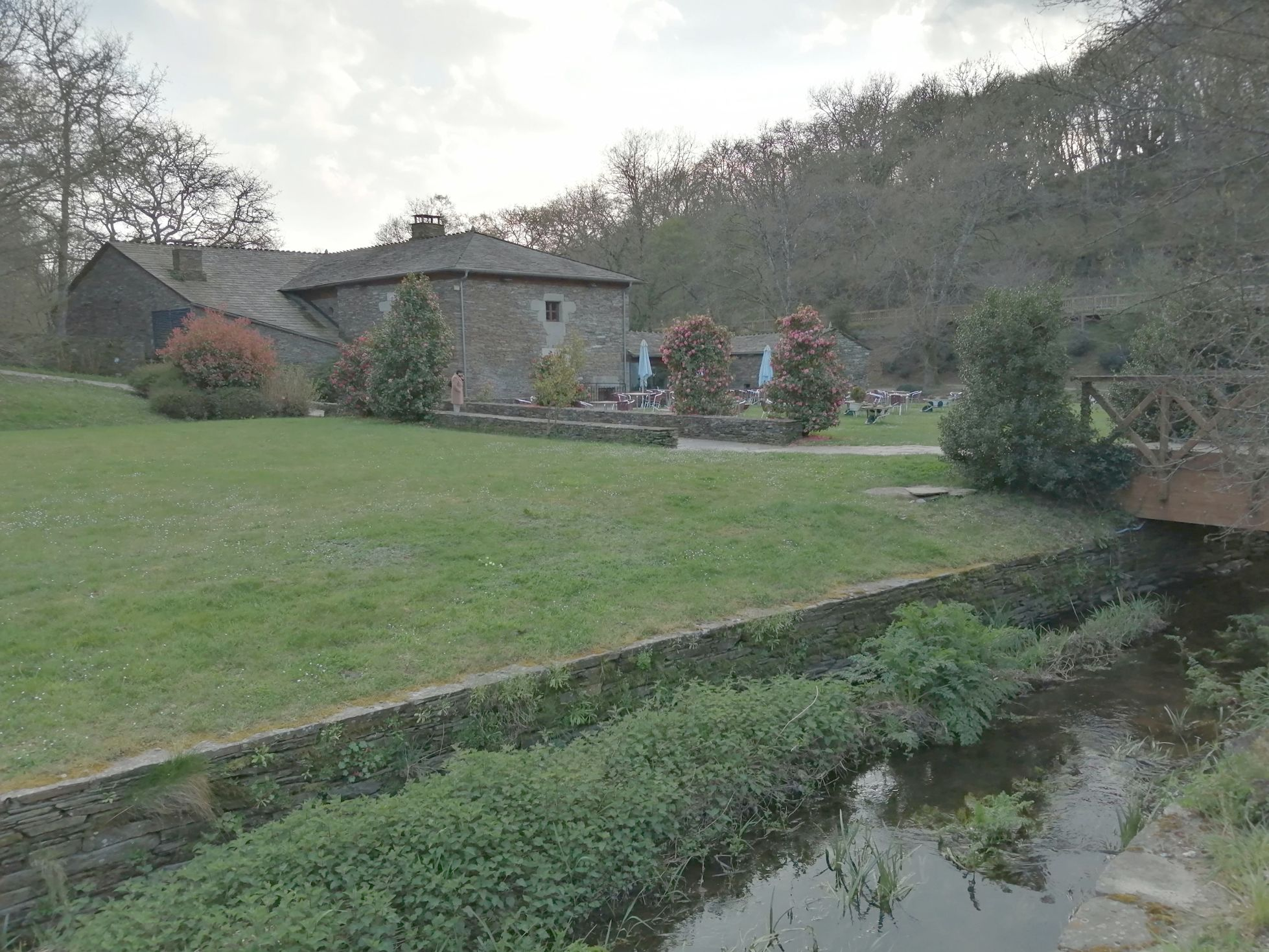
Muiño do Tendeiro

==== Montirón Velodrome ====
In September 1896, Ramón Neira Pedrosa, one of Lugo's most prominent early cyclists (a pioneer of the high-wheel velocipede), competed in the "spacious Montirón velodrome" against local and regional specialists. The races were held over various distances, including 1,000 meters, 1,500 meters, and a 5,000-meter endurance event. Neira, who found success in the sport during his youth, later entered politics in the 20th century, serving as Lugo's first deputy mayor, a provincial deputy, and a board member of the Bank of Spain.

The track cyclists at the Montirón velodrome were true pioneers; notably, Spain's first major national velodrome, the Velòdrom d'es Tirador in Palma de Mallorca, was not inaugurated until 1903, the same year that the world's most famous cycling race, the Tour de France, held its inaugural edition.

=== 20th century ===
==== Early decades ====
At the turn of the 20th century, thanks to its excellent terrain and location less than a kilometer from the Roman walls and historic center of Lugo, Montirón served as a major leisure and recreation area for locals. Period newspapers document numerous sporting events (chiefly football and cycling), early aviation exhibitions, equestrian competitions, and pigeon shooting tournaments.

As an anecdote, the Café Español and the Hotel Méndez Núñez, managed by the same company at the time, maintained an ice well in Montirón to preserve winter snow for refreshing summer drinks and ice cream. The ice-making machinery of these establishments proved lucrative, as advertised in the local press during the summer of 1915.

==== Early aviation in Montirón (1911–1912) ====
The beginnings of aviation in Spain date back to 1911. On 12 March of that year, Benito Loigorri Pimentel, Spain's first licensed pilot, completed the country's first flight, traveling from Ciudad Lineal to Carabanchel (both now districts of Madrid). Just three months later, in June 1911, Loigorri flew a Farman biplane at Montirón. Facing poor wind conditions, he managed to stay airborne for a minute and a half before crashing into a rye field in nearby Castelo, causing significant damage to the aircraft and minor bruising to himself.

The following year, as part of the Corpus Christi celebrations in June 1912, a flight exhibition was held by Leoncio Garnier, a Basque-French pilot. Garnier tested his monoplane at the Montirón field with greater success, performing aerial acrobatics for crowds that gathered from all across the province of Lugo and other parts of Galicia. Garnier (1881–1963) went on to become a pioneer of both aviation and motorsport, becoming the first pilot to fly over the Pyrenees and the Canary Islands.

==== Equestrian competitions ====
An equestrian competition was held for the first time in Montirón during the traditional San Froilán fairs and festivals of 1928. These events continued for decades, including documented competitions in 1946.

==== Development of the neighborhood ====
During the post-Civil War period, when Montirón Street was virtually the only road and Rof Codina was merely a cart path, the Obra Sindical del Hogar y la Arquitectura planned a residential development. Founded in 1940 to address Spain's acute housing shortage caused by wartime destruction, rural flight, and demographic growth, the state organization projected approximately 88 two-story houses with attached plots of land. Built in the late 1940s under the name "Viviendas Protegidas Hermanos Pedrosa Posada", these homes, alongside the adjacent Francisco Norte housing development, formed the historic nucleus of modern Montirón. This orderly housing cluster, isolated rural fields, and a dirt football pitch appear in aerial photography from the 1956–1957 American flyover, accessible via the Spanish National Geographic Institute.

This residential area was initially separated from the city center by farmland and stood close to the parish of San Fiz, which features a 1916 church with an elegant two-bell belfry, a traditional stone cross (cruceiro) in its courtyard cemetery, and examples of vernacular architecture.

The original neighborhood design included a porticoed square, typical of the urban planning of the era. Now known as the Praza das Illas, it underwent its most recent major rehabilitation in 2008.

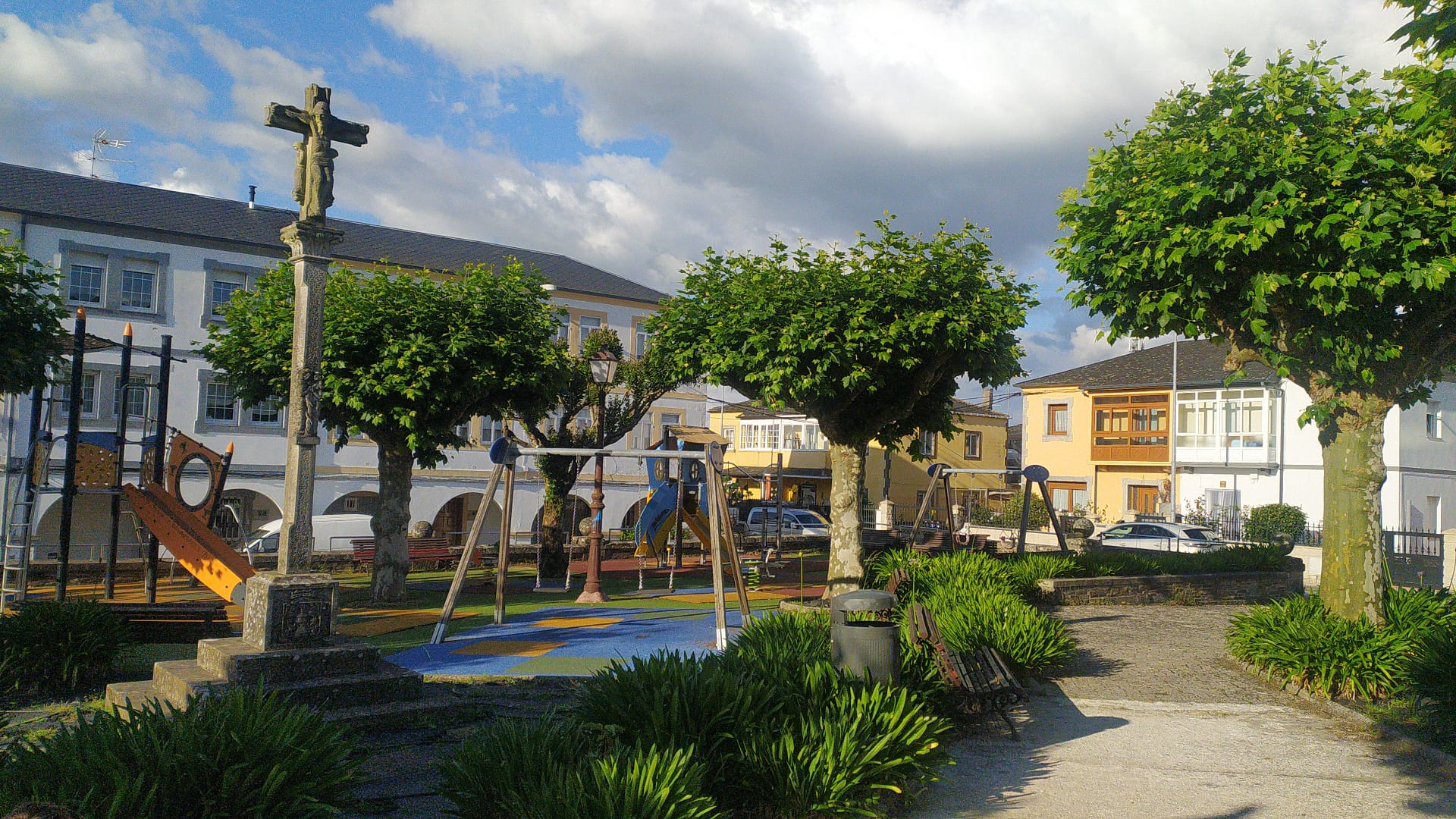
Praza das Illas

In subsequent decades, the neighborhood expanded with new one- and two-story buildings. A major milestone occurred in 1976 with the opening of the Ramón Falcón Higher School of Art and Design, inaugurated by King Juan Carlos I. Industrial and commercial businesses also arrived in the area, such as Muebles Castro, the El Bueno brush factory, and the Cash Miño wholesale warehouse. By the late 1990s, the historic center of Montirón had completely integrated into the wider urban fabric of Lugo.

=== 21st century ===
At the turn of the century, Lugo experienced major expansion toward the southeast, significantly increasing Montirón's population. The neighborhood became home to specialized research centers, including the Dairy Products and Food Technology Center (APLTA) of the University of Santiago de Compostela, the Galicia Animal Health and Production Laboratory (LASAPAGA), and the Agrifood Technological Center (CTAL). The CTAL facility, opened in 2013, has housed the National Plant Health Laboratory under the Ministry of Agriculture, Fisheries and Food since 2022, generating professional employment in the zone.

Today, Montirón contains a mix of local businesses, offices, and mid-rise apartment buildings, notably around the Plaza de San Juan, which includes a children's playground and a fenced sports court. Public infrastructure in the neighborhood includes the Casa da Xuventude (Youth Center), the Xoán Montes Professional Conservatory of Music, the Lugo Official School of Languages, and the local police headquarters. The neighborhood also features Galicia's first residential building to receive the Passivhaus energy efficiency certificate, consisting of an 8-story eco-friendly complex completed in late 2021 behind the police station.

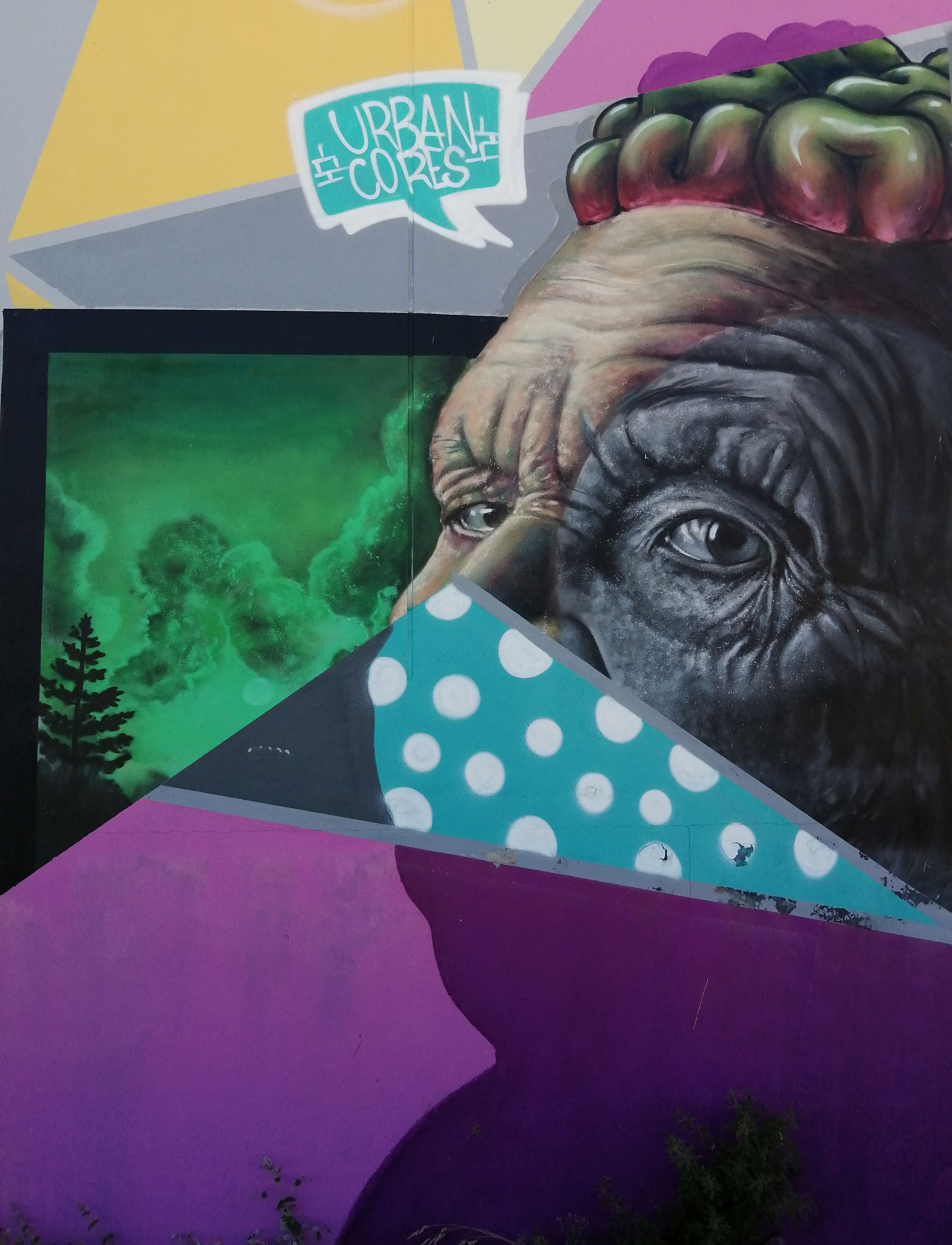
Mural on the Casa da Xuventude

Points of interest include a mural by local artist Diego AS (Diego Anido Seija), which won the 2021 Spanish National Graffiti Championship, and a decommissioned Dassault Falcon 20 aircraft. Formerly used by Spanish government officials, the jet was saved from a scrapyard and reassembled piece by piece for educational display by students at the CPIFP As Mercedes vocational school.

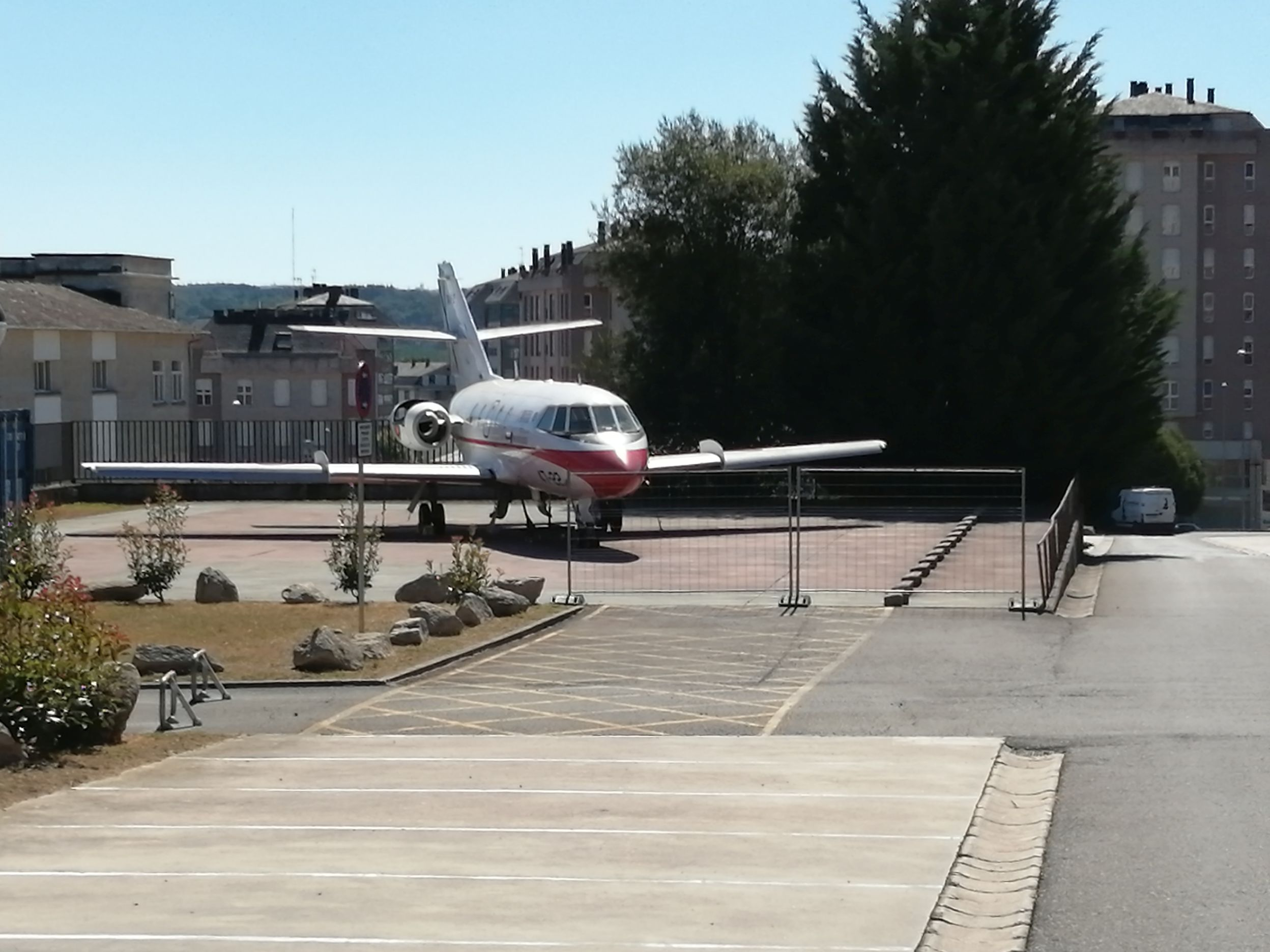
Dassault Falcon 20

Children visiting the neighborhood can also search for one of the *Pequerrechas*, miniature decorative doors installed on stone walls throughout the city of Lugo.

== Traditions ==
The neighborhood's main festival centers around St John's Eve (San Juan on 23 June), featuring a large bonfire, live music, and a traditional outdoor sardine roast (sardinada). Historically, the neighborhood also hosted a popular Carnival parade on Shrove Tuesday (Martes de Entroido).

Decades ago, fields at the end of the Ronda de las Mercedes hosted events tied to the Fiestas de San Froilán, a festival of National Tourist Interest. Additionally, Lugo's first wooden bullring was erected in the fields of Montirón during the 19th century, with municipal records noting its presence as early as 1877.

The principal neighborhood association is the Asociación Praza das Illas, which organizes social and festive activities, alongside the older Asociación de Vecinos Hermanos Pedrosa Posada y Francisco Norte Remón.

== Sports ==
On 4 October 1908, an exhibition match between Coruña F.C. and Widowers F.C. was held at the Montirón field during the San Froilán festival, an event considered the birth of organized football in Lugo. Starting in the 1950s, the neighborhood was represented intermittently by its own club, Club Recreativo Unión de Montirón, which played home matches at the O Polvorín municipal stadium. Today, Montirón features a dirt football pitch and a rugby field built on land formerly known to locals as the fields of Isidro de la Cal.

A 2.5-kilometer illuminated bicycle path was opened in 2020 along the river walk of the Rato River, utilizing solar panels to provide lighting. On 4 November 2020, the streets of Montirón welcomed the caravan of the Vuelta a España for the start of stage 14.
