= Ancient Roman defensive walls =

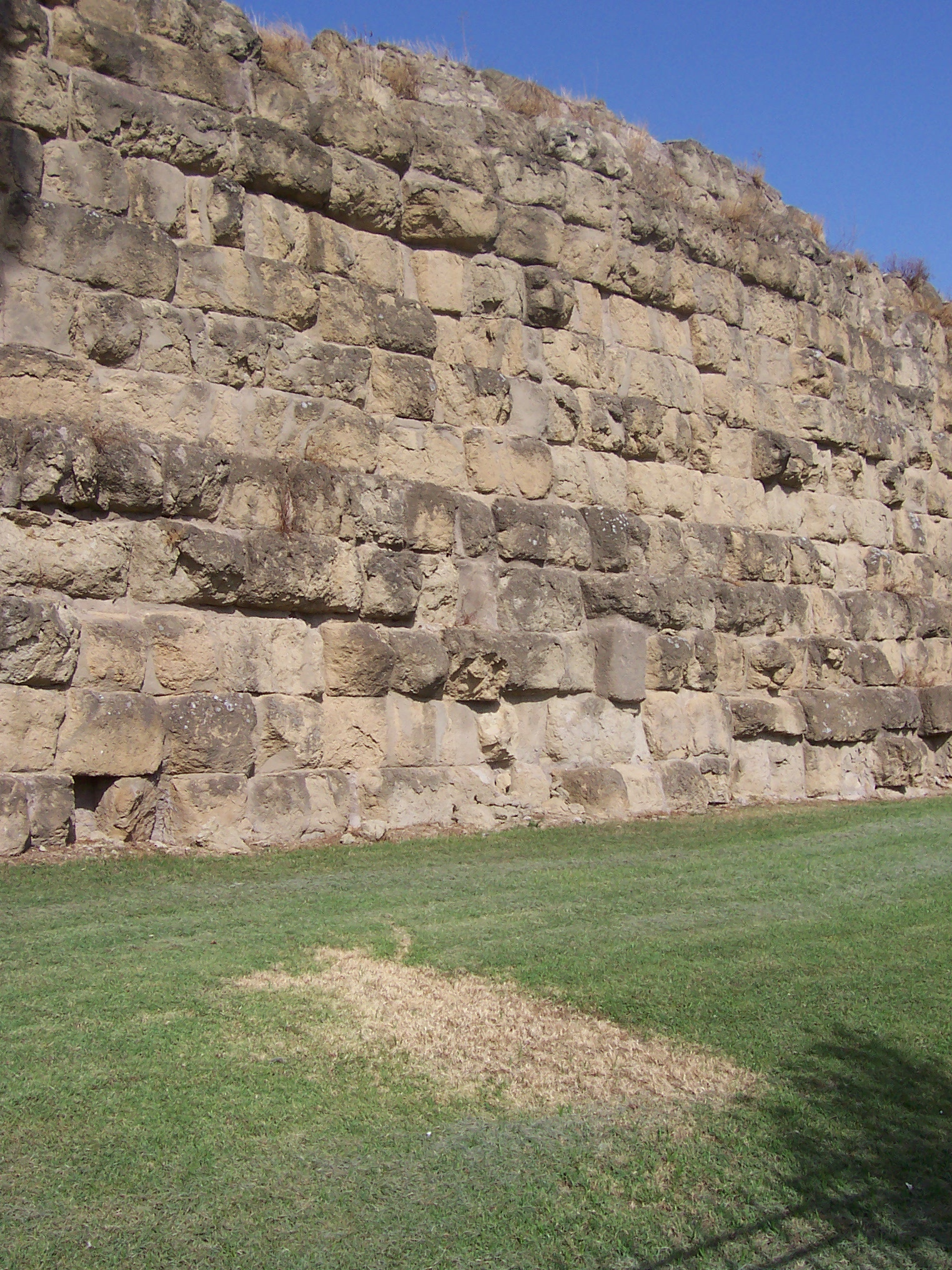
Section of the Servian Wall

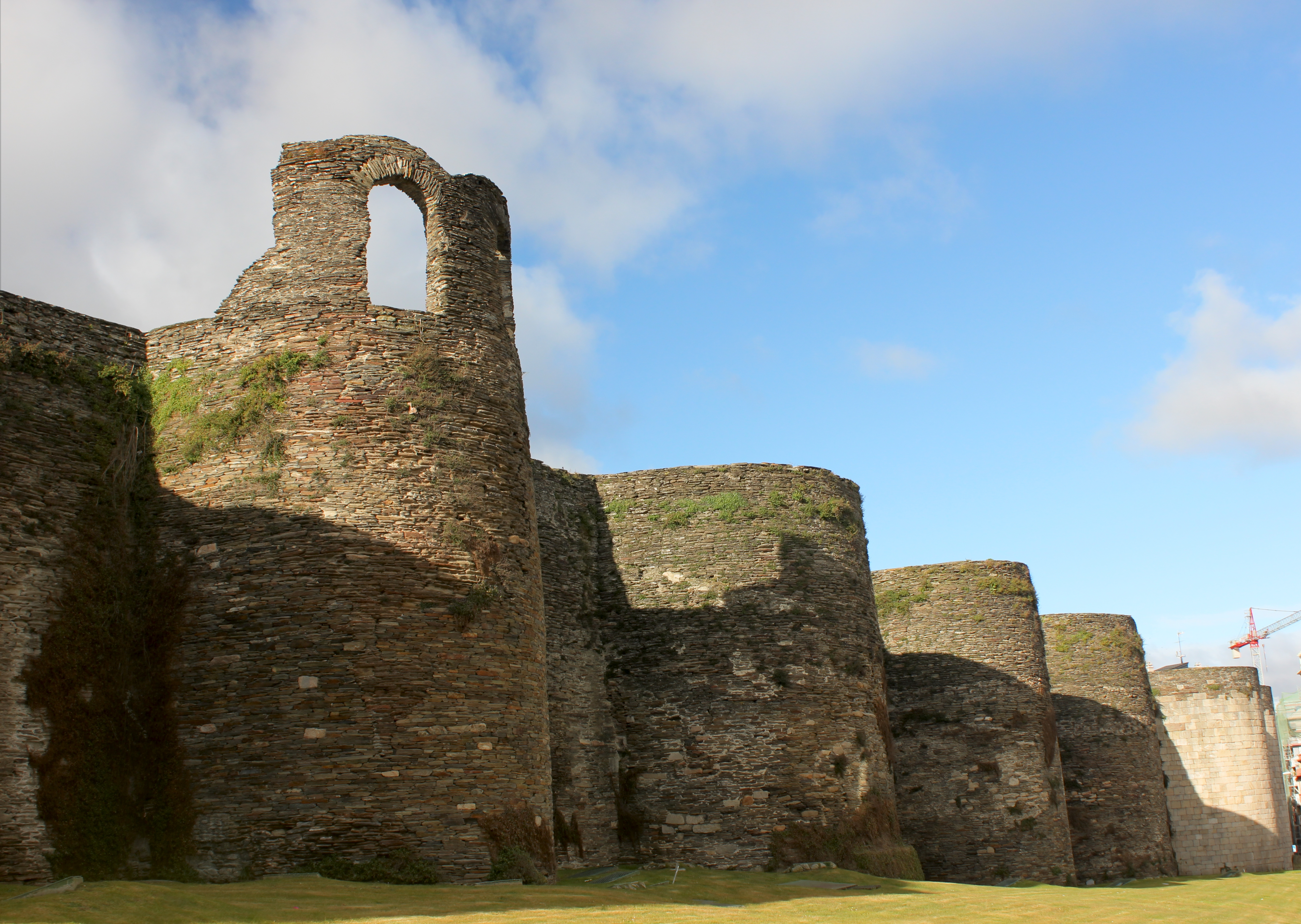
Section of the Roman walls of Lugo, Spain, 263–276 AD

Defensive walls are a feature of ancient Roman architecture. The Romans generally fortified cities, rather than building stand-alone fortresses, but there are some fortified camps, such as the Saxon Shore forts like Porchester Castle in England. City walls were already significant in Etruscan architecture, and in the struggle for control of Italy under the early Republic many more were built, using different techniques. These included tightly fitting massive irregular polygonal blocks, shaped to fit exactly in a way reminiscent of later Inca work. The Romans called a simple rampart wall an agger; at this date great height was not necessary. The Servian Wall around Rome was an ambitious project of the early 4th century BC. The wall was up to 10 metres (32.8 ft) in height in places, 3.6 metres (12 ft) wide at its base, 11 km (7 mi) long, and is believed to have had 16 main gates, though many of these are mentioned only from writings, with no other known remains. Some of it had a fossa or ditch in front, and an agger behind, and it was enough to deter Hannibal. Later the Aurelian Wall replaced it, enclosing an expanded city, and using more sophisticated designs, with small forts at intervals.

The Romans walled major cities and towns in areas they saw as vulnerable, and parts of many walls remain incorporated in later defences, as at Córdoba (2nd century BC), Chester (earth and wood in the 70s AD, stone from c. 100), and York (from 70s AD). Strategic walls defending the frontiers of the Empire by running across open country were far rarer, and Hadrian's Wall (from 122) and the Antonine Wall (from 142, abandoned only 8 years after completion) are the most significant examples, both on the Pictish frontier. Most defences of the borders of the Roman Empire relied on systems of forts and roads without attempting a continuous barrier.

== Examples ==
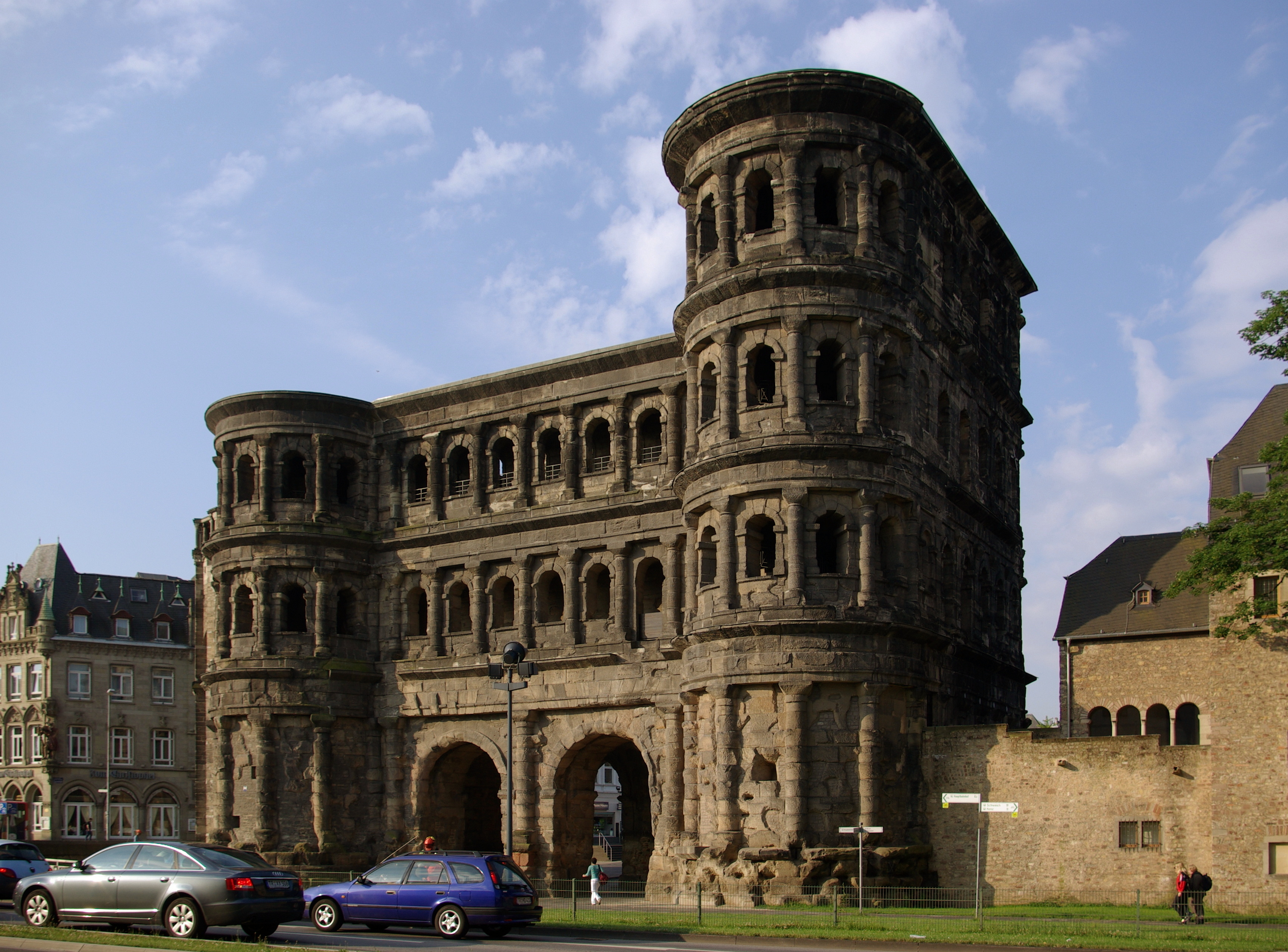
The Porta Nigra of Trier, Germany, capital of the Roman province of Gallia Belgica, constructed between 186 and 200 AD.

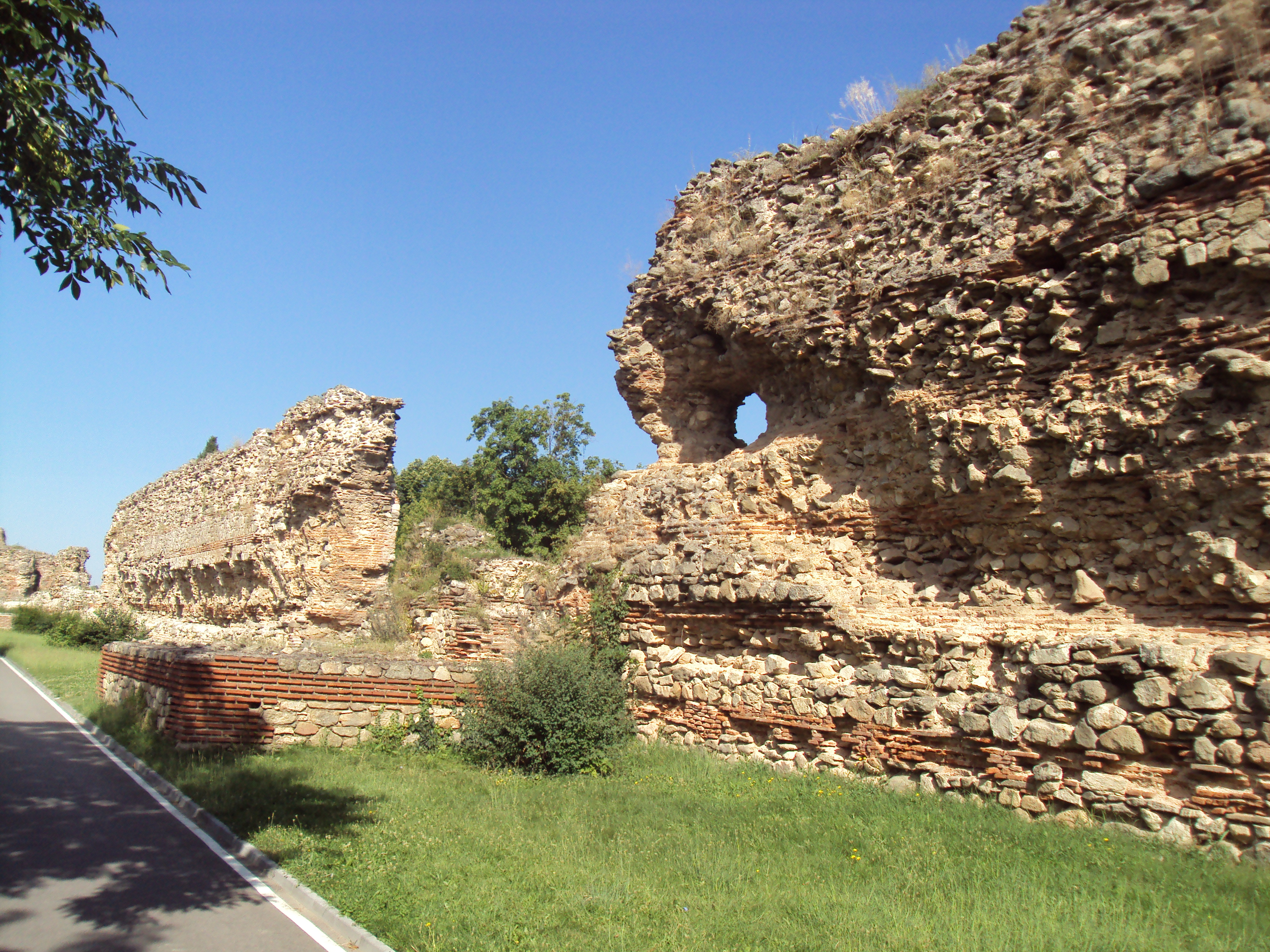
Diocletianopolis city walls, Hisarya, Bulgaria

Notable walls built by ancient Rome include, in chronological order of construction:

- Murus Romuli, built around early Rome in remote antiquity
- Servian Wall, built around Rome in the early 4th century BC
- Roman walls of Córdoba
- Colchester city walls, built after the Boudiccan revolt c.65–80 A.D
- Chester city walls, originating as part of the fortress of Deva Victrix between 70 and 80 AD
- York city walls, originally constructed around 71 AD when York was a Roman colony
- Hadrian's Wall, built in England beginning in 122 AD at the edge of Roman conquest to keep out the Picts
- Antonine Wall, a short-lived, advanced frontier wall built in Scotland north of Hadrian's Wall beginning in 142 AD
- Serdica first defensive walls build between 176 and 180 under Marcus Aurelius as evidenced by inscriptions above the gates. Serdica again flourished in the 6th century during the reign of Justinian I, when its defensive walls were reinforced by doubling their thickness and adding more towers, and whose remnants can still be seen today
- London Wall, built around Londinium between 190 and 225, probably between 200 and 220
- Roman walls of Lugo, built between 263 and 276 AD to defend the Roman town of Lucus Augusti (in what is now Spain)
- Aurelian Walls, the later wall of Rome, built in the late 3rd century AD
- Diocletianopolis city walls of 2.3 km total length were built in the early 4th century after the Gothic invasions
- Walls of Constantinople, a great defensive wall that defended the metropolitan capital from the fourth century AD until 1453
- Anastasian Wall, a wall named built in the late 5th century to ensure extra defenses for Constantinople. It was not very effective, and was abandoned in the 7th century
- Venta Silurum, Caerwent, Wales. Si o que Venta Silurum was a town in the Roman province of Britannia. The walls are some of the best examples in the UK

== See also ==
- Museum of the Walls, Rome
- Roman military frontiers and fortifications
- Limes (Roman Empire), a border defense or delimiting system of ancient Rome
