= Roman bridge of Lugo =

Coordinates: 43.0020°N 7.5636°W

- Puente Romano de Lugo
- Lugo; Near Lugo in Spain
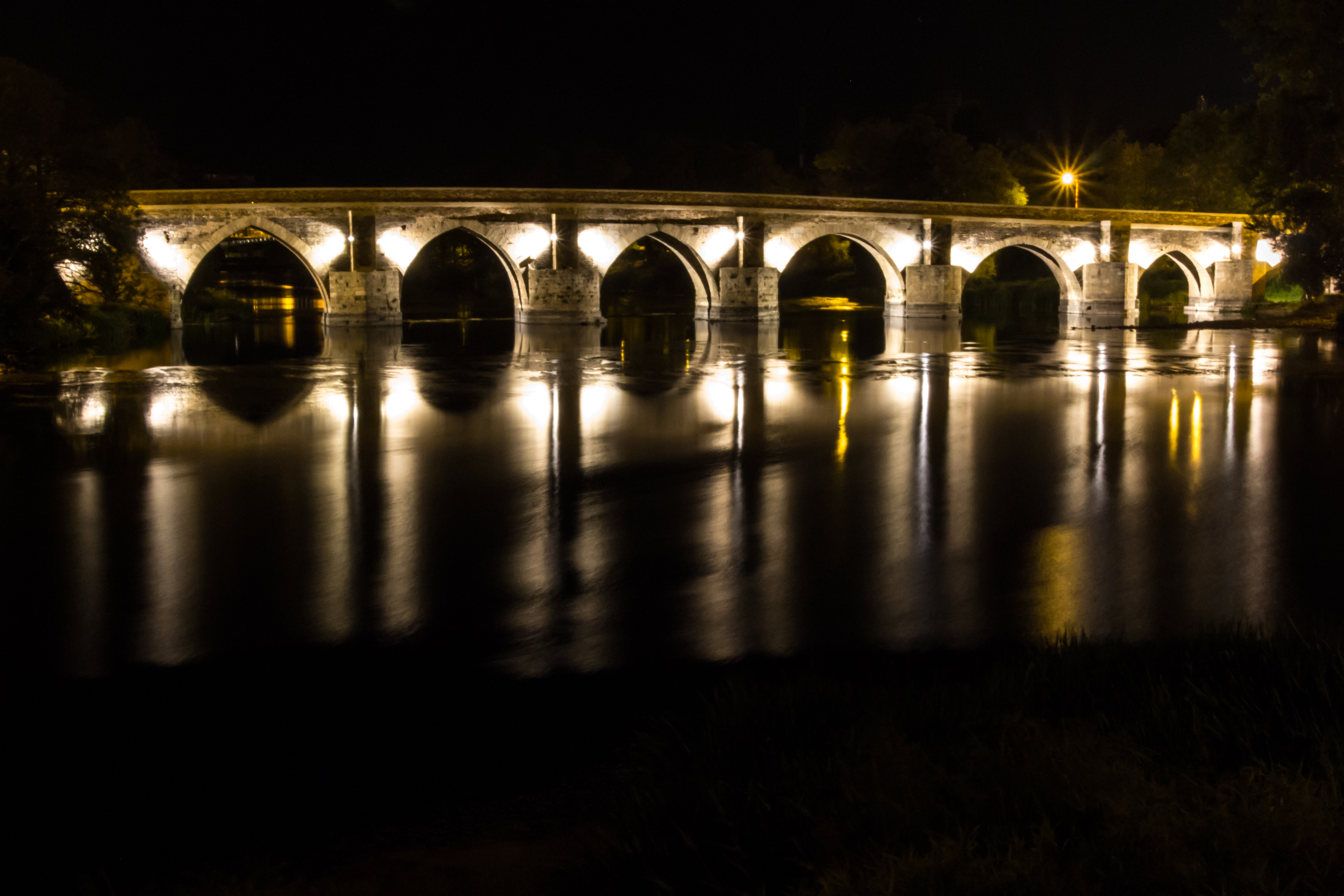
- The Roman bridge at night

Site information
- Type: Ancient Roman bridge
- Open to the public: Yes
- Website: www.lugoaccesible.net/index.php/es/lugo-romano/12-el-puente-romano

Location
- Length: 104 metres

Site history
- Built: 1st century
- Built by: Roman culture
- Materials: stone and slate
- Bridge width 4 metres

The Roman bridge of Lugo crosses the Minho river in Lugo, Galicia. The bridge is of Roman origin and has been rebuilt many times in its history.

The bridge was open to traffic until 2012. It was then closed to all vehicles and converted to a pedestrian-only footbridge. The roadway and modern superstructure was replaced with contemporary stonework to complement the bridge's original features.

== Features ==
The structure is made primarily of stone and slate, with added metallic walkways. The surface was paved, allowing for continuous vehicle passage, with the exception of heavy vehicles, which were not permitted to cross.

It was a frequently used bridge, given its proximity to the Lugo Fluvial Club, among other recreational facilities, and to the Lucense Polyclinic. It was also the most logical route to the Portomarín road or the Lugo Golf Club. Following the construction of the new bridge over the Miño, traffic was diverted to a newly created route for that purpose.

Currently, this bridge is one of the two pedestrian bridges the city has to offer.

== History ==
The bridge was designed and built during the Romanization of Galicia. It utilized route number XIX of the Antonine Itinerary, connecting Lucus Augusti with Bracara Augusta (present-day Braga) and passing through Iria Flavia (the current town of Padrón). The reason for its construction was the need to cross the Miño River.

Centuries later, during the Late Middle Ages, the bridge underwent significant restorations. This was partly due to its deteriorating condition and also to meet the new transportation needs of the era. With the onset of the Modern Age, further repairs were once again necessary. Ultimately, in 1893, its appearance was definitively altered by the removal of several elements. However, the foundations of the current bridge, often referred to as the "old" or "Roman" bridge, largely remain original.

Due to the construction of a new bridge in 2009, the Roman bridge of Lugo was restored and designated for pedestrian use. During the restoration process, the metallic walkways were removed and the asphalt surface was taken out, with efforts made to make it resemble as closely as possible its appearance during Roman times.

== Route from the city of Lugo to the Roman bridge ==
The Calzada del Puente, which descends from the Puerta Miñá or Puerta del Carmen (one of the ten gates of the city wall, and also one of the five original ones that is best preserved) to the Roman bridge, is part of the Primitive Pilgrimage Route to Santiago de Compostela. This is also where the hiking route "Las ribeiras altas, Miño arriba" begins, popularly known as the "Paseo del Puente Viejo." This route stretches over eleven kilometers along both banks of the river, heading towards the old light factory.

== Gallery ==
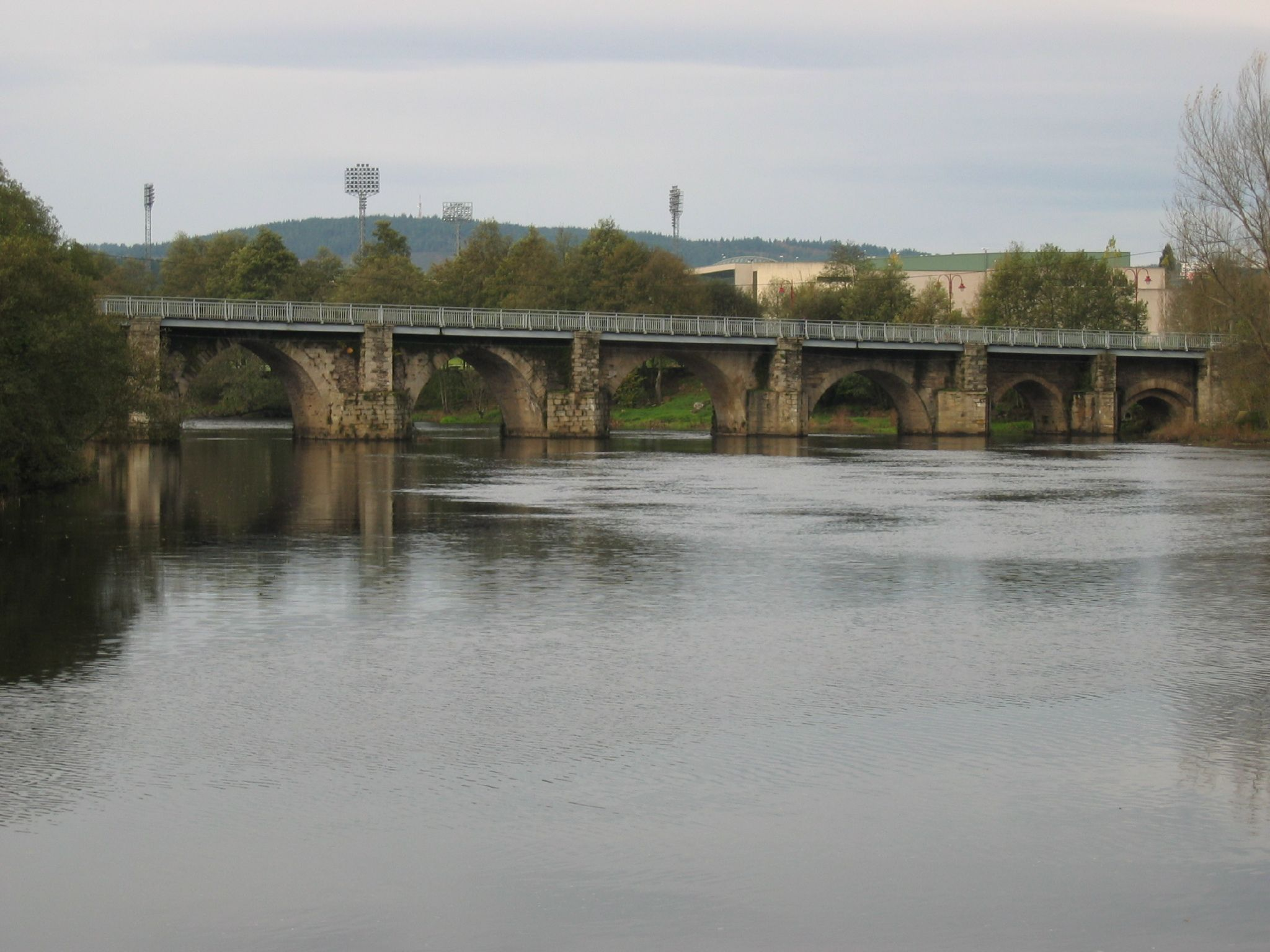
Bridge when it was still open to traffic c. 2008

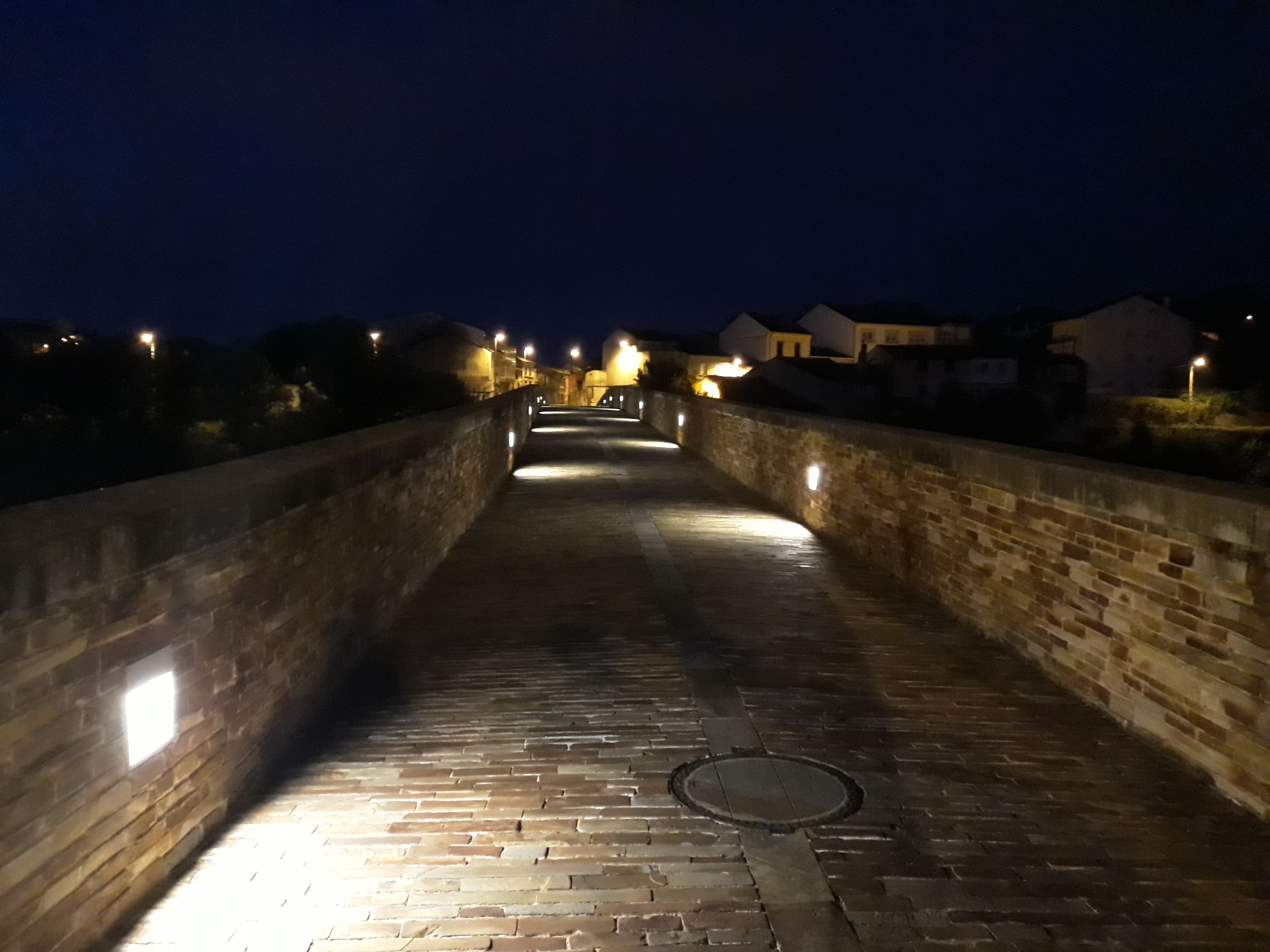
The pedestrianised bridge in c. 2019

== See also ==
- Roman walls of Lugo
- List of Roman sites in Spain
