= Arde Lucus =

Spanish festival

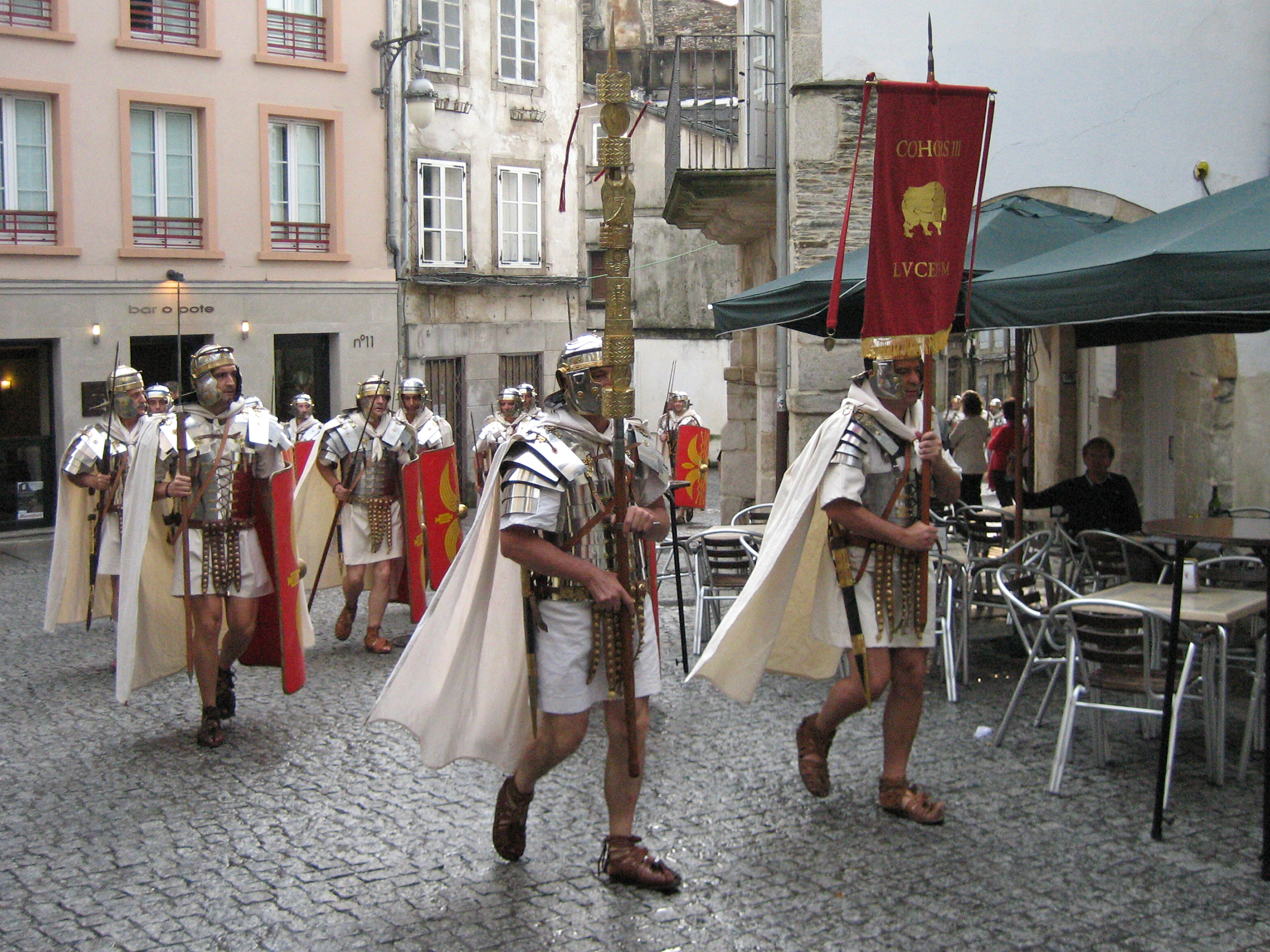
- Date: Last weeks of June
- Frequency: Annual
- Locations: Lugo, Spain
- Coordinates: 43.0116°N 7.5572°W
- Inaugurated: 2001

Fiesta of International Tourist Interest
- Designated: 2023

Arde Lucus (also written as Arde Lvcvs; lit. transl. Burn Lugo) is a festival celebrated in Lugo, Spain in the last weeks of June which revives the Roman and castro past of the city, and which emerged to commemorate the declaration of the city's Roman walls as a World Heritage Site in 2000. In its latest editions it has reached nearly half a million visitors.

== History ==
This festivity, which tries to evoke the ancient Lucus Augusti in the 3rd century, began to be celebrated in the year 2000, growing in popularity year after year, with more and more people dressing up in Roman and castro attires. In the year 2009 the festival reached 460.000 participants, leaving a profit of around 10 million euros in the city.

It is necessary to mention that also, the council counts with the help of diverse associations for the celebration and ambient atmosphere of the festival, performing in many of the activities. A few of these associations are Cohors III Lucensium, Terra Copora, Ludlum, Tir Nan'og, and Trebas Galaicas.

The first female only association, the Assemblearias de Lucus Augusti, was founded in 2012, by Dr Cristina Arias Rey along with 10 others. The current president of the group is Pilar Arias.

== Activities ==
All of the activities mix the city's Roman past with the "permission" for the celts to perform some of their rites inside the city walls. Some of the highlighted events include:

- Military Camps

They are a series of camps which have to be set up by the participants, who can be groups of people or associations, and in which they must "live" dressed up with the clothes and objects of the era. In its last edition, the camps were situated in the "Carril das Estantigas", inside Lugo's Roman walls. Also, each camp can organize its own activities and shows, always open to everyone. These camps can either be Roman or Castro.

- Celtic weddings

In this activity, the couples who wish to, can be wed by the ancient Celts rite, love union which lasts until the next year. Then, the couple can decide whether they want to renew their marriage or not (it is the woman who decides the renewal). If the marriage is renovated during seven consecutive years, the union will remain forever. At the end of the wedding, each couple is given a wedding certificate.

- Macellum

An artisan market where all sorts of Roman goods are sold. Magic, juggling and music shows also take place in this place.

- Roman circus

It takes place in the "Parque de Rosalía", near the historic centre. Ancient Roman activities like gladiator fights, or quadriga races, imitating the ancient Roman circuses.

- The burning of the city walls

In this show, the siege of the Roman city is recreated, with fights between different groups and associations, as well as many volunteers, as well as a fireworks display.

- Comilonum

It is an enormous open air banquet in which tables are placed around the Roman wall. In the 2009 edition it was substituted by the "Tabernae", a diner located in the Praza da Soidade.

- Other events

Apart from the others, there are many other activities like Bacchanalia, statue building, magic shows, fancy dress parades, Roman clothes contests, Roman games, battle recreations between Romans and Celts, gladiator fights, slave sales, Roman weddings, military instruction in the city's streets and different activities to remind the citizens of the Roman and Castro past of the city. There are also some music and dance shows and parades.
