= Lugo =

- Municipality
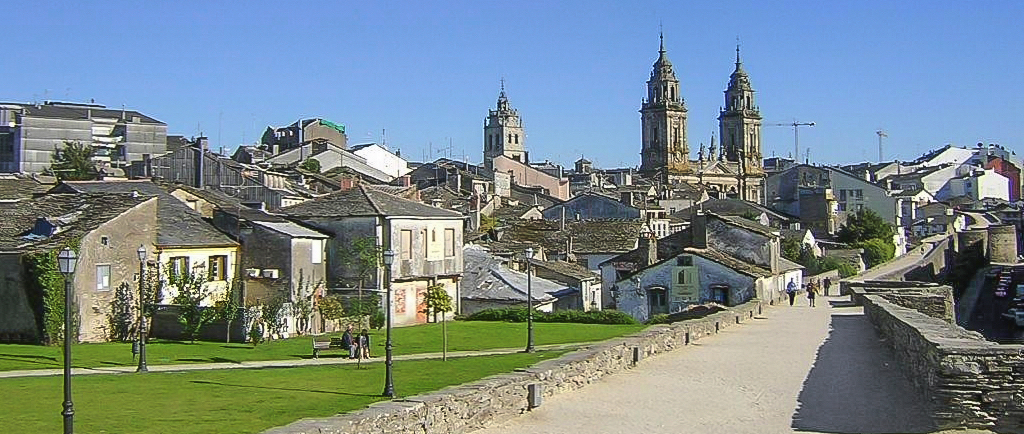
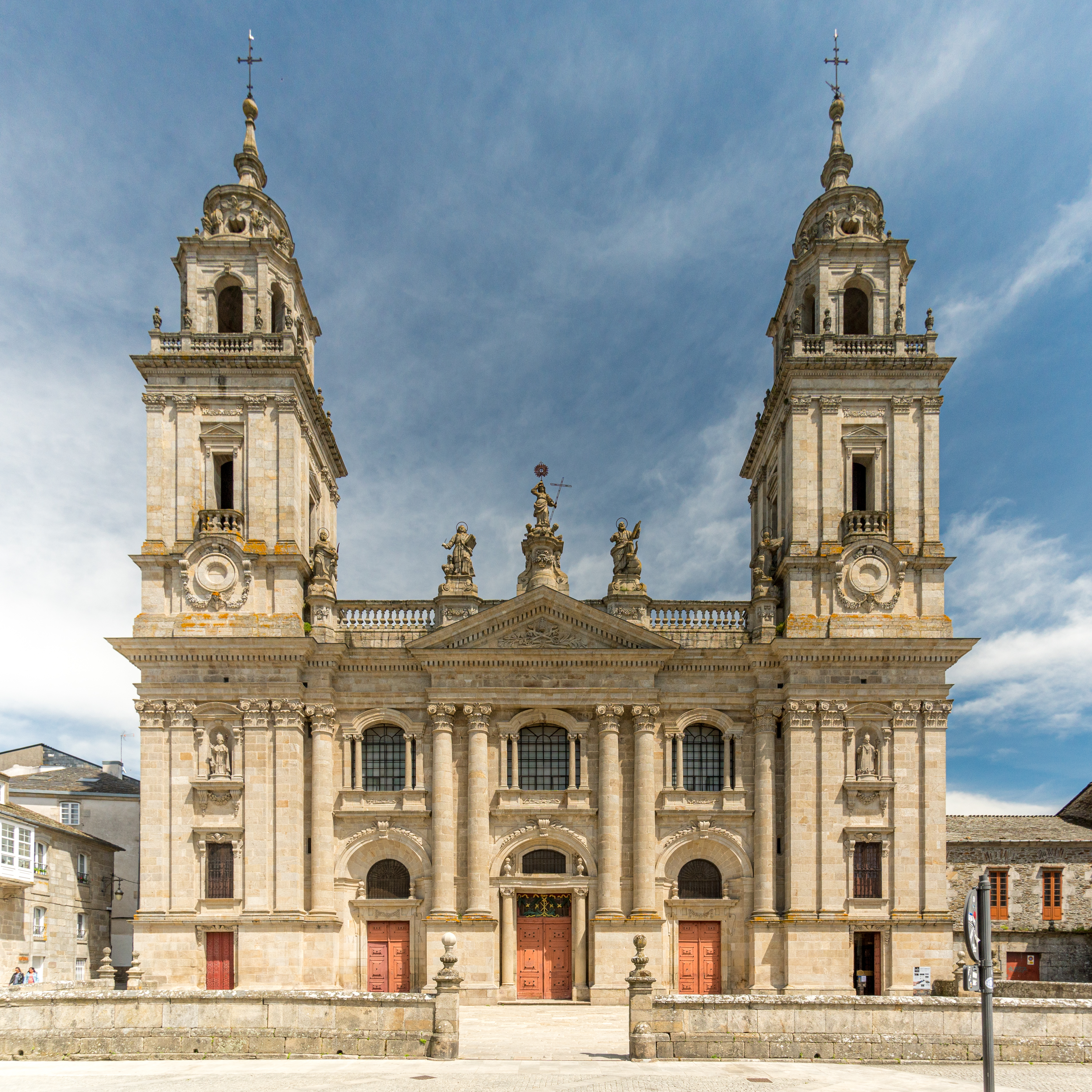
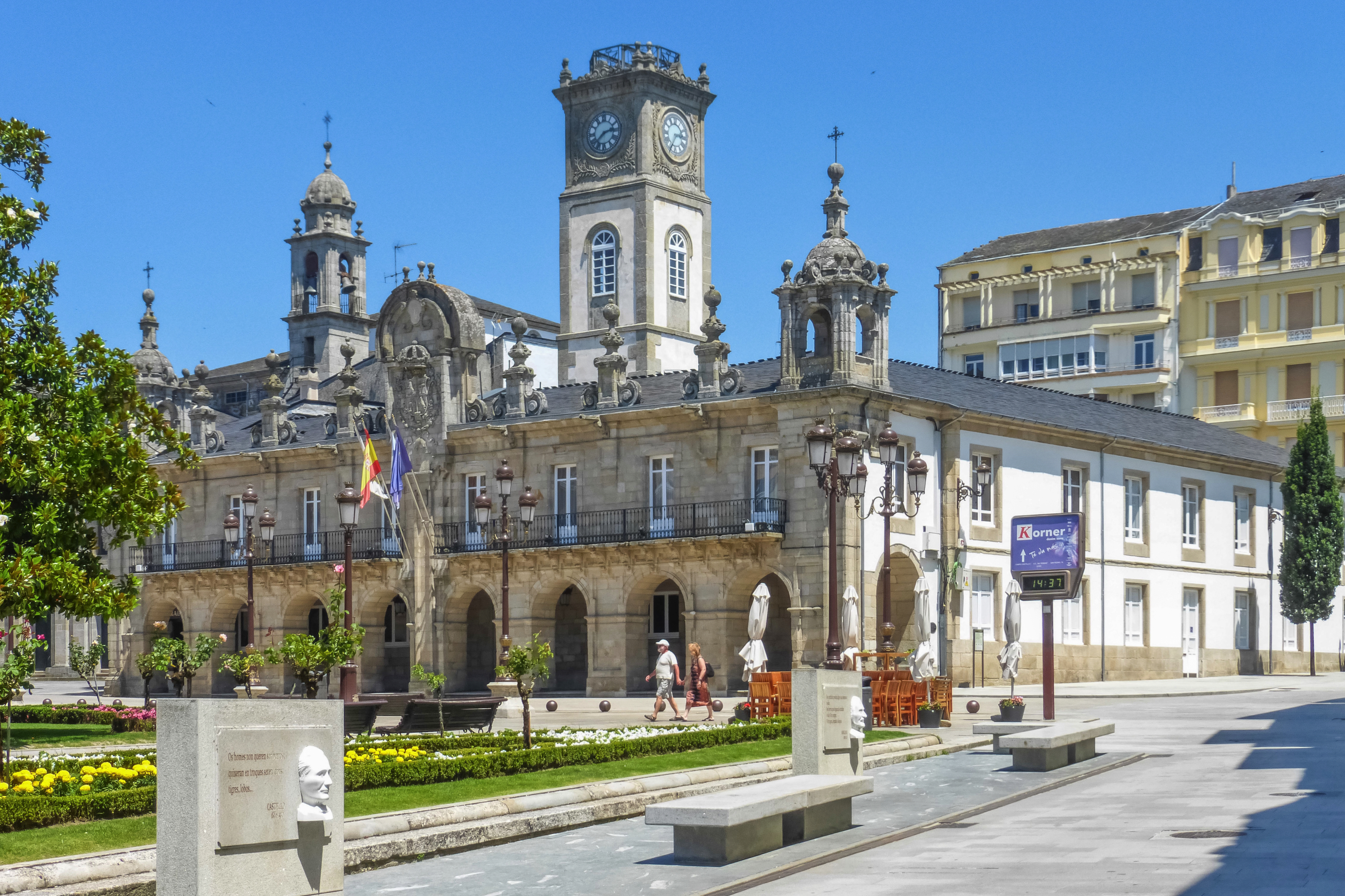
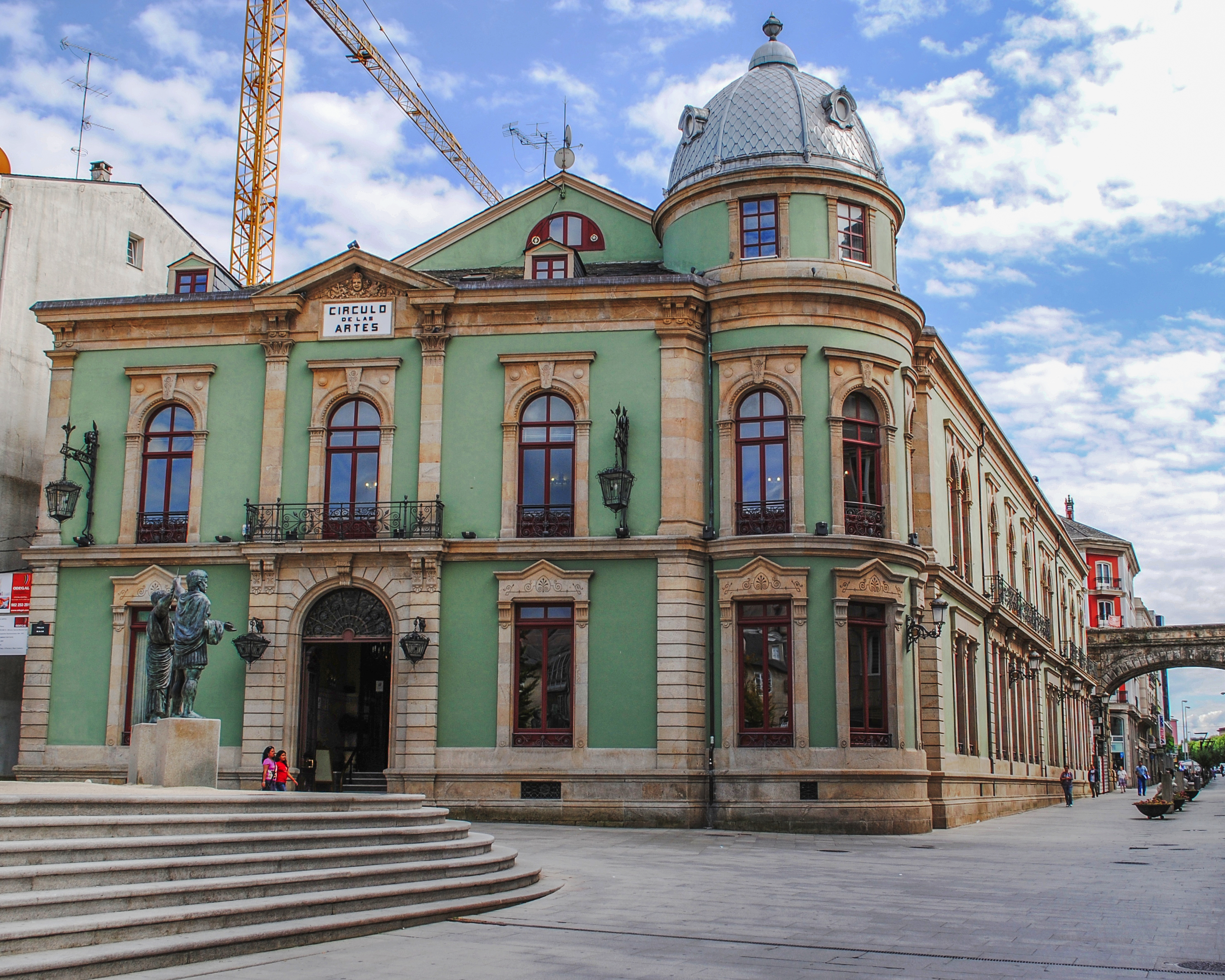
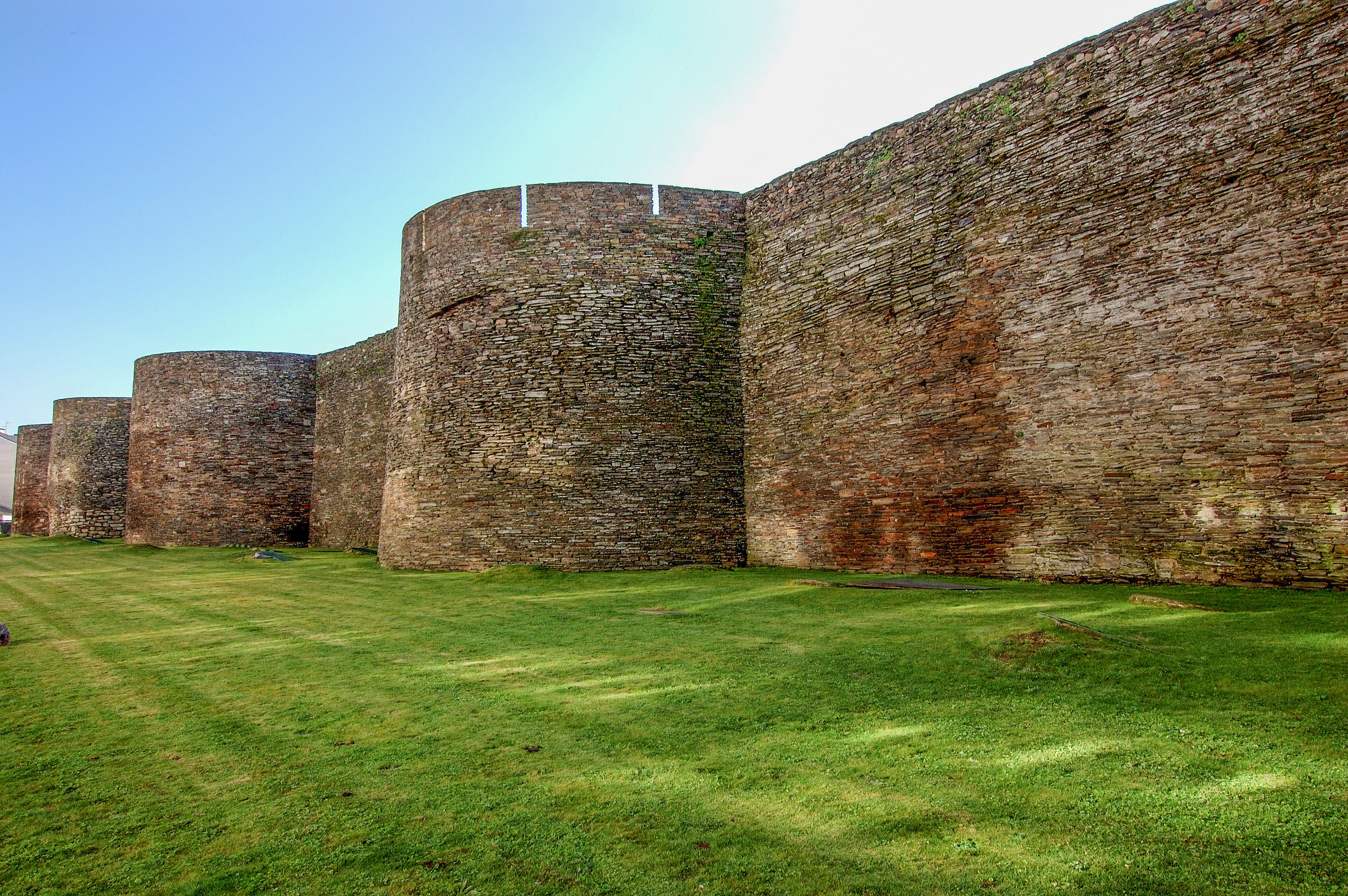
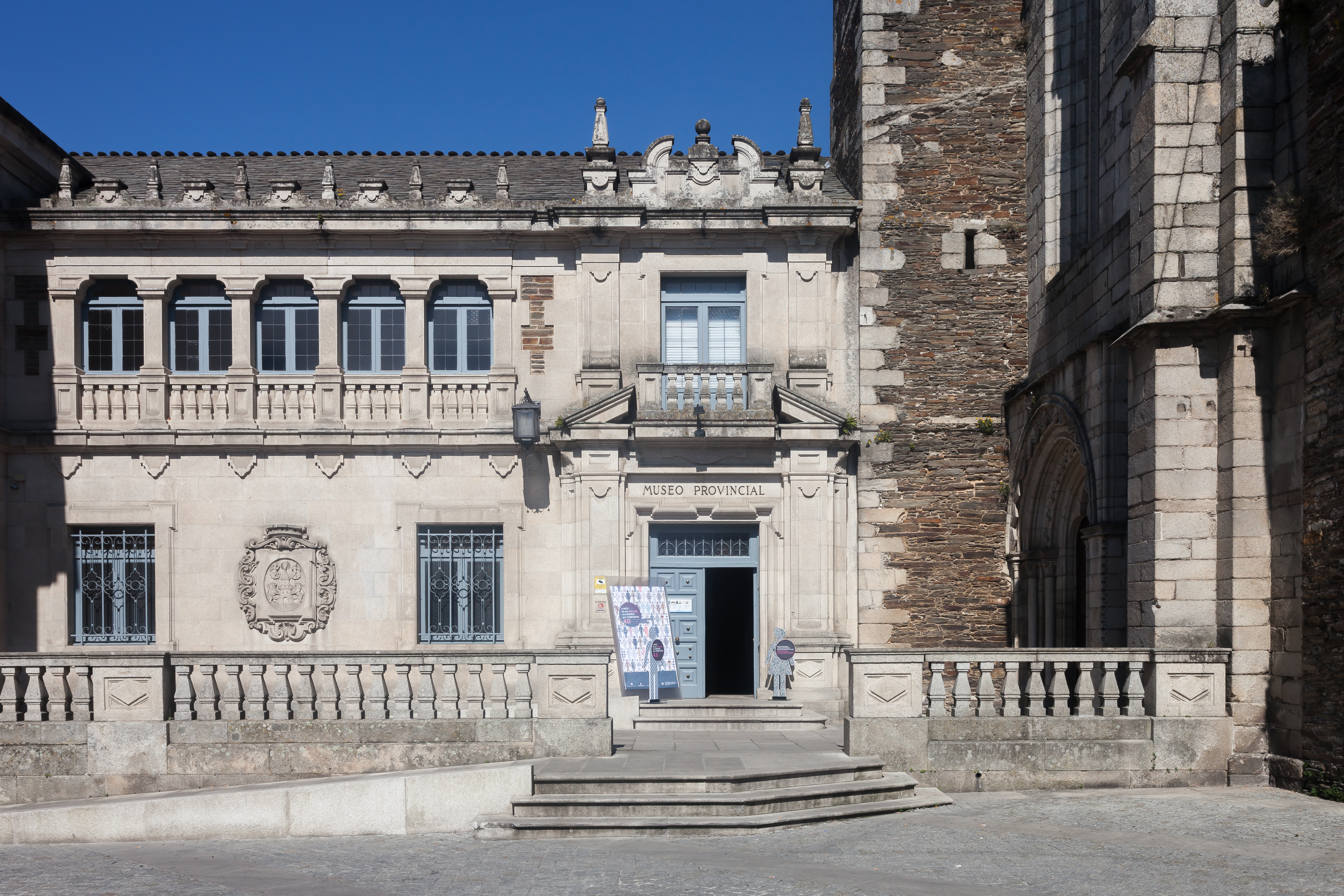
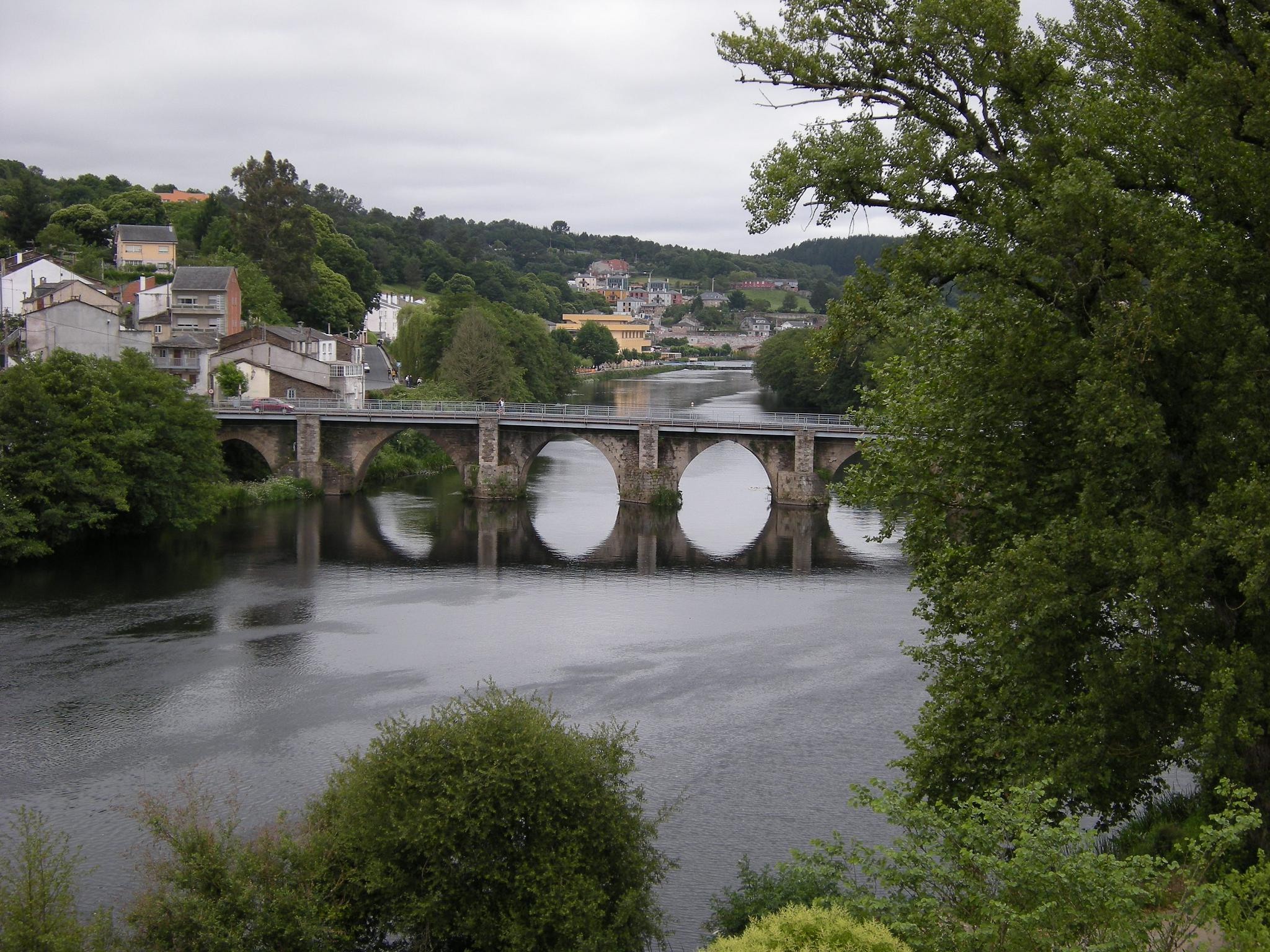
- View of Lugo Cathedral City Hall Círculo das Artes Roman Walls Provincial Museum Roman Bridge

- Flag Coat of arms
- Interactive map of Lugo
- Coordinates: 43°01′N 7°33′W
- Country: Spain
- Autonomous Community: Galicia
- Province: Lugo
- Comarca: Lugo

Government
  - Type: Ayuntamiento
  - Body: Concello de Lugo
  - Mayor: Elena Candia (PPdeG)

Area
  - Total: 332 km^{2} (128 sq mi)
- Elevation: 465 m (1,526 ft)

Population (2025-01-01)
  - Total: 100,143
  - Density: 302/km^{2} (781/sq mi)
- Demonym(s): lucense lugués/a
- Time zone: CET (GMT +1)
  - Summer (DST): CEST (GMT +2)
- Postcode: from 27001 to 27004
- Area code: +34-982
- ISO 3166-2: ES-LU
- Patron Saint: Saint Froilán
- Website: http://concellodelugo.gal/

Lugo (Galician: [ˈluɣo], Spanish: [ˈluɣo]) is a city in northwestern Spain in the autonomous community of Galicia. It is the capital of the province of Lugo. The municipality had a population of 100,060 in 2024, making it the fourth most populous city in Galicia.

Lugo is the only city in the world to be surrounded by completely intact Roman walls, which reach a height of 10 to 15 metres (33 to 49 feet) along a 2,117-metre (6,946 ft) circuit ringed with 71 towers. The walk along the top is continuous around the circuit and features ten gates. The 3rd century Roman walls, the only one of its kind in the world, are protected by UNESCO as a World Heritage Site. The city's historic bridge over the Miño is also essentially of Roman date. The city of Lugo is along the Camino Primitivo path of the Camino de Santiago.

== Population ==
Historical population
Year	Pop.	±%
1842	13,986	—
1857	21,314	+52.4%
1877	18,939	−11.1%
1887	19,938	+5.3%
1900	28,024	+40.6%
1910	35,889	+28.1%
1920	29,940	−16.6%
1930	32,259	+7.7%
1940	41,011	+27.1%
1950	52,093	+27.0%
1960	57,786	+10.9%
1970	63,604	+10.1%
1981	72,574	+14.1%
1991	83,242	+14.7%
2001	88,414	+6.2%
2011	98,001	+10.8%
2021	97,514	−0.5%
2025	102,107	+4.7%
Source: National Statistics Institute

The population of the city in 2018 was 98,026 inhabitants, which has been growing constantly since the first census in 1842, despite the fact that the rest of the province is losing population dramatically. The population of the city in 2014 was 98,560 inhabitants (45,948 men and 52,612 women). From INE (Instituto Nacional de Estadística).

By December 2025, the population had grown to 102,107. Reaching and surpassing 100,000 inhabitants was one of the goals of the city Mayor, Lara Méndez.

In 2010 there were 5,373 foreigners living in the city, representing 5.5% of the total population. The main nationalities are Colombians (18%), Moroccans (12%) and Brazilians (11%).

By language, according to 2008 data, 47.37% of the population speaks always or mainly in Galician, 52.63% speaks always or mainly in Spanish.

== History ==
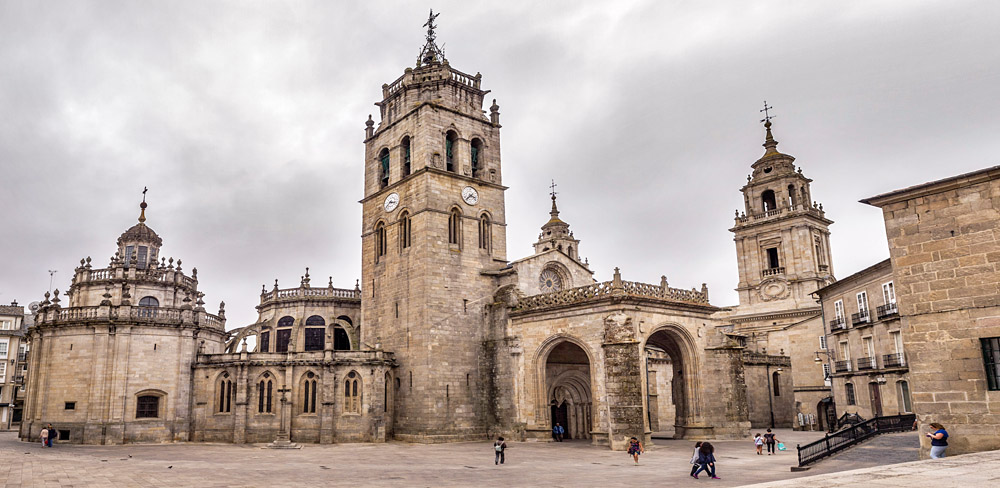
Overview of the Cathedral of Santa María in the city of Lugo.

Conquered by Paullus Fabius Maximus and called Lucus Augusti in 13 BC on the positioning of a Roman military camp, (Note: The cardo and decumanus of the ancient plan can still be recognized in the modern street plan.) while the Roman Empire completed the conquest, in the North, of the Iberian Peninsula. Situated in what was the Roman province of Hispania Tarraconensis, it was the chief town of the tribe of the Capori. Though small it was the most important Roman town in what became Gallaecia during the Roman period, the seat of a conventus, one of three in Gallaecia, and later became one of the two capitals of Gallaecia, and gave its name to the Callaïci Lucenses. It was centrally situated in a large gold mining region, which during the Roman period was very active. The Conventus Lucensis, according to Pliny, began at the river Navilubio, and contained 16 peoples; besides the Celtici and Lebuni. Though these tribes were not powerful, and their names "barbarous" to Roman ears, there were among them 166,000 freemen. The city stood on one of the upper branches of the Minius (modern Miño), on the road from Bracara to Asturica, and had some famous baths, near the bridge across the Miño.

Lucus was the seat of a bishopric by the later 5th century at the latest and remained an administrative center under the Suebi and Visigoths, before going into such a decline that the site was found to be deserted in the middle of the 8th century by Bishop Odoario, who set about reviving it. 10th-century attempts at rebuilding its casas destructas (abandoned tenements) suggest that it remained a town only on paper: the seat of a bishopric, administered by a count, from which royal charters were issued. "Its commercial and industrial role was insignificant", Richard Fletcher wrote of 11th century Lugo.

During the Middle Ages Lugo, like Santiago de Compostela, was a center of pilgrimage, because the cathedral had the special privilege, which it still retains today, of exposing to the public the consecrated host twenty-four hours a day. However, Santiago De Compostela was a larger site of Pilgrimages. Most people who went on Pilgrimages would take a stop in Lugo and continue on. The walls were a small center for pilgrims to enamor at. In the 18th century Lugo was granted the privilege of organizing the fairs of St. Froilán. During the Modern Age, Lugo had a certain supremacy, although other nearby towns such as Mondoñedo or Ribadeo disputed it. It was not until the division of the state into provinces in 1833 and the creation of provincial governments that Lugo has become the most important town in the province of Lugo, because of its capital status. This rise has been bolstered by the arrival of the first railroad to the city in 1875.

During the 20th century the city continued to grow as the administration and services center of the province. In 1936, when the Civil War broke out, the city came quickly under the Nationalists' control. In the 1970s the city undertook important reforms, like the development of the Ceao Industrial Area (1979) and the complete restoration of the Roman walls.

Infanta Elena, the elder daughter of King Juan Carlos and Queen Sofía of Spain and fourth in the line of succession to the Spanish throne, has been duchess of Lugo since 1995.

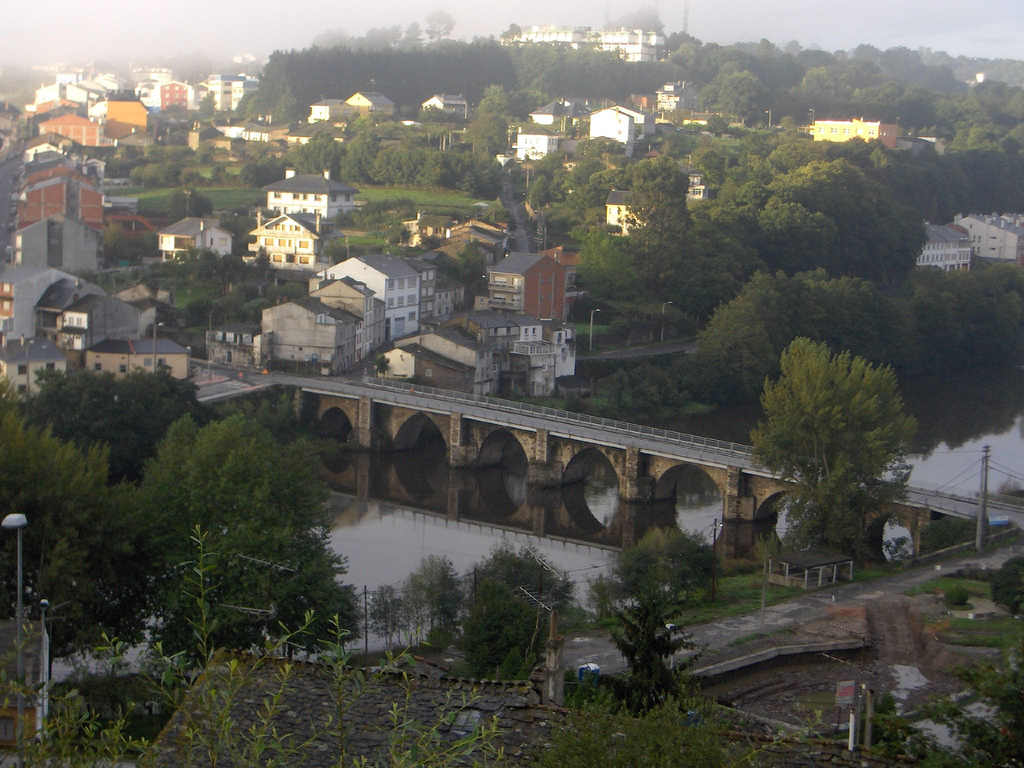
Old Roman bridge over the Miño River.

In 2000, the recognition of the Roman walls on UNESCO's World Heritage Site was an important event in the city.

== Economy ==
Lugo is a city of services. The main activities are commercial, the administration (offices of the autonomous and central Governments) and educational and health services (the recently opened Hospital Universitario Lucus Augusti is the largest in Galicia). The steady increase of population of the city has coincided with the development of the major economic sectors of the municipality. Industry is scarce and almost exclusively dedicated to the processing of agricultural products (dairy, meat, timber ...).

The University of Santiago de Compostela has several faculties at its Lugo Campus, one of the most important being the Faculty of Veterinary sciences, one of the leading in its field in Spain.

The daily newspaper El Progreso, is published in the city. It's the most read newspaper in the province of Lugo.

There is a private aerodrome in the nearby town of Rozas, owned by the Spanish Ministry of Defence and administered by Real Aero Club de Lugo. In 2011, the Ministry of Defence transferred the installations to INTA, Spain's space agency, in order to convert it into a center of aeronautical research,

The nearest passenger airports are A Coruña Airport, located 90 km (56 mi) north east and Santiago–Rosalía de Castro Airport, located 93 km (58 mi) west of Lugo.

== Geography ==
Map of the municipality of Lugo and its parroquias.

The town lies on a hill surrounded by the rivers Miño, Rato and Chanca. The difference in altitude between the city centre and the river banks is considerable: the former being at an altitude of 465 meters above sea level, whilst the Miño River Walk is at an altitude of only 364 metres (1,194 feet). The municipality of Lugo is the second largest in Galicia, with 329.78 square kilometres (127.33 sq mi) and 59 parishes. The outline of the city was declared a Biosphere Reserve by UNESCO on 7 November 2002, this being the most important recognition at international level regarding the conservation of landscapes and habitats of this Atlantic European region.

The area has been divided into more than 54 villages: Adai, Bacurín, Bascuas, Bazar, Benade, Bocamaos, Bóveda, O Burgo, Calde, Camoira, Carballido, Coeo, Coeses, Cuíña, Esperante, Gondar, Labio, Lamas, Lugo, Mazoi, Meilán, Monte de Meda, Muxa, Ombreiro, Orbazai, O Outeiro das Camoiras, Pedreda, Pías, Piúgos, Poutomillos, Prógalo, Recimil, Ribas de Miño, Romeán, Rubiás, Saa, San Mamede dos Anxos, San Martiño de Piñeiro, San Pedro de Mera, San Román, San Salvador de Muxa, San Xoán de Pena, San Xoán do Alto, San Xoán do Campo, Santa Comba, Santa María de Alta, Santa Marta de Fixós, Santalla de Bóveda de Mera, Santo André de Castro, Soñar, Teixeiro, Tirimol, Torible, O Veral, Vilachá de Mera.

=== Climate ===
Lugo has a humid oceanic climate with drier summers, although in the Köppen climate classification it would be classified as a mild Mediterranean climate (Csb) depending on summer precipitation threshold. Due to its remoteness from the Atlantic, its annual precipitation of 1,084 millimetres (42.7 in) can be considered low compared with areas of the Rias Baixas and Santiago de Compostela. The highest temperature recorded in history, 39.6 °C (103 °F), occurred in August 1961 and the lowest temperature was −13.2 °C (8.2 °F) in February 1983. The city has an average of six days of snow per year, which is a contrast to coastal cities of Galicia which have not received snow in modern times.

Climate data for Lugo Airport 445 metres (1,460 ft) (1991–2020)
Month	Jan	Feb	Mar	Apr	May	Jun	Jul	Aug	Sep	Oct	Nov	Dec	Year
Record high °C (°F)	21.3 (70.3)	24.0 (75.2)	27.8 (82.0)	31.8 (89.2)	34.3 (93.7)	36.4 (97.5)	41.2 (106.2)	40.8 (105.4)	37.8 (100.0)	31.9 (89.4)	23.1 (73.6)	23.4 (74.1)	41.2 (106.2)
Mean daily maximum °C (°F)	10.7 (51.3)	12.3 (54.1)	15.1 (59.2)	16.5 (61.7)	19.6 (67.3)	22.7 (72.9)	24.7 (76.5)	25.4 (77.7)	23.1 (73.6)	18.7 (65.7)	13.3 (55.9)	11.1 (52.0)	17.9 (64.2)
Daily mean °C (°F)	6.5 (43.7)	7.1 (44.8)	9.3 (48.7)	10.7 (51.3)	13.6 (56.5)	16.5 (61.7)	18.6 (65.5)	18.8 (65.8)	16.7 (62.1)	13.3 (55.9)	9.2 (48.6)	7.1 (44.8)	12.4 (54.3)
Mean daily minimum °C (°F)	2.4 (36.3)	1.9 (35.4)	3.4 (38.1)	4.8 (40.6)	7.5 (45.5)	10.4 (50.7)	12.4 (54.3)	12.2 (54.0)	10.3 (50.5)	7.9 (46.2)	5.1 (41.2)	3.2 (37.8)	6.9 (44.4)
Record low °C (°F)	−9.2 (15.4)	−11.6 (11.1)	−8.2 (17.2)	−4.6 (23.7)	−1.6 (29.1)	1.0 (33.8)	3.0 (37.4)	1.6 (34.9)	0.6 (33.1)	−2.2 (28.0)	−7.4 (18.7)	−10 (14)	−11.6 (11.1)
Average precipitation mm (inches)	126.5 (4.98)	94.9 (3.74)	100.3 (3.95)	104.9 (4.13)	82.6 (3.25)	51.0 (2.01)	33.3 (1.31)	39.7 (1.56)	67.8 (2.67)	141.0 (5.55)	153.8 (6.06)	141.2 (5.56)	1,137 (44.77)
Average precipitation days (≥ 1.0 mm)	15.1	11.5	12.5	13.8	11.5	6.4	4.7	5.8	8.2	13.6	15.6	14.4	133.1
Mean monthly sunshine hours	85	118	158	169	201	215	234	238	191	144	82	73	1,908
Source: Météo Climat

Climate data for Lugo Airport 445m (1985-2010)
Month	Jan	Feb	Mar	Apr	May	Jun	Jul	Aug	Sep	Oct	Nov	Dec	Year
Record high °C (°F)	20.3 (68.5)	23.8 (74.8)	27.8 (82.0)	31.8 (89.2)	34.0 (93.2)	36.4 (97.5)	41.2 (106.2)	40.8 (105.4)	37.8 (100.0)	30.6 (87.1)	22.4 (72.3)	23.4 (74.1)	41.2 (106.2)
Mean daily maximum °C (°F)	10.6 (51.1)	12.3 (54.1)	15.2 (59.4)	15.7 (60.3)	19.3 (66.7)	22.3 (72.1)	24.4 (75.9)	25.2 (77.4)	23.0 (73.4)	18.3 (64.9)	13.3 (55.9)	11.0 (51.8)	17.6 (63.7)
Daily mean °C (°F)	6.2 (43.2)	7.0 (44.6)	9.2 (48.6)	10.0 (50.0)	13.2 (55.8)	16.1 (61.0)	18.2 (64.8)	18.5 (65.3)	16.4 (61.5)	12.9 (55.2)	8.9 (48.0)	6.9 (44.4)	12.0 (53.6)
Mean daily minimum °C (°F)	1.8 (35.2)	1.7 (35.1)	3.0 (37.4)	4.3 (39.7)	7.2 (45.0)	9.9 (49.8)	12.0 (53.6)	11.8 (53.2)	9.8 (49.6)	7.6 (45.7)	4.5 (40.1)	2.7 (36.9)	6.3 (43.3)
Record low °C (°F)	−9.2 (15.4)	−7.4 (18.7)	−8.2 (17.2)	−4.6 (23.7)	−1.0 (30.2)	1.4 (34.5)	4.2 (39.6)	1.6 (34.9)	0.6 (33.1)	−2.2 (28.0)	−7.4 (18.7)	−10 (14)	−10 (14)
Average precipitation mm (inches)	114 (4.5)	87 (3.4)	80 (3.1)	102 (4.0)	81 (3.2)	52 (2.0)	34 (1.3)	36 (1.4)	68 (2.7)	137 (5.4)	144 (5.7)	134 (5.3)	1,069 (42)
Average precipitation days (≥ 1.0 mm)	14	11.1	11.2	14	11.6	6.6	4.6	5.2	7.7	13.6	14.3	13.8	127.7
Average snowy days	1.7	1.7	0.8	0.7	0	0	0	0	0	0	0.3	1.0	6.2
Average relative humidity (%)	83	79	74	75	73	73	73	72	75	81	85	85	77
Mean monthly sunshine hours	86	101	146	160	191	211	231	240	179	135	86	85	1,851
Source: Agencia Estatal de Meteorología (normals 1981-2010)

== Main sights ==
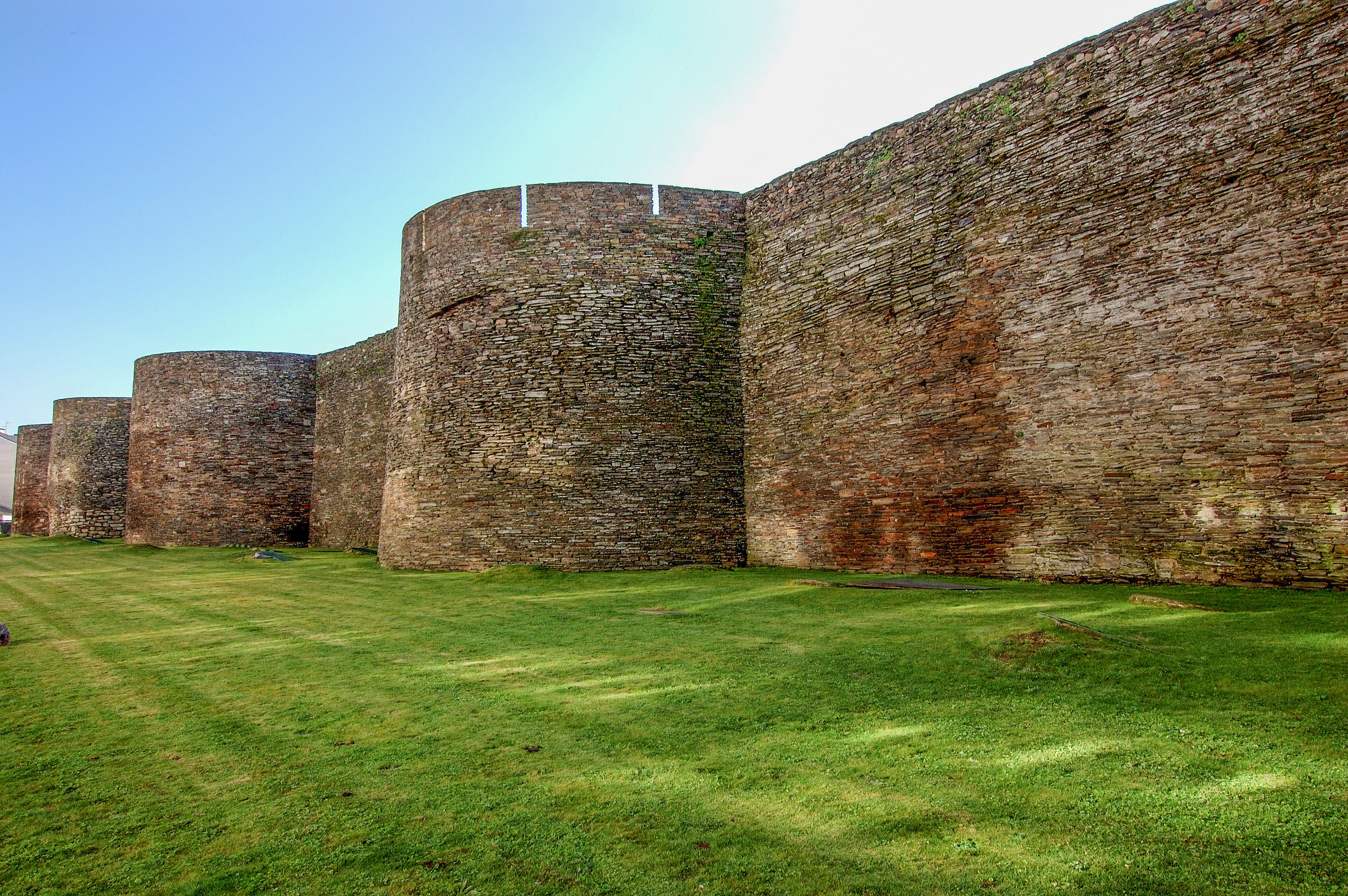
Roman walls of Lugo

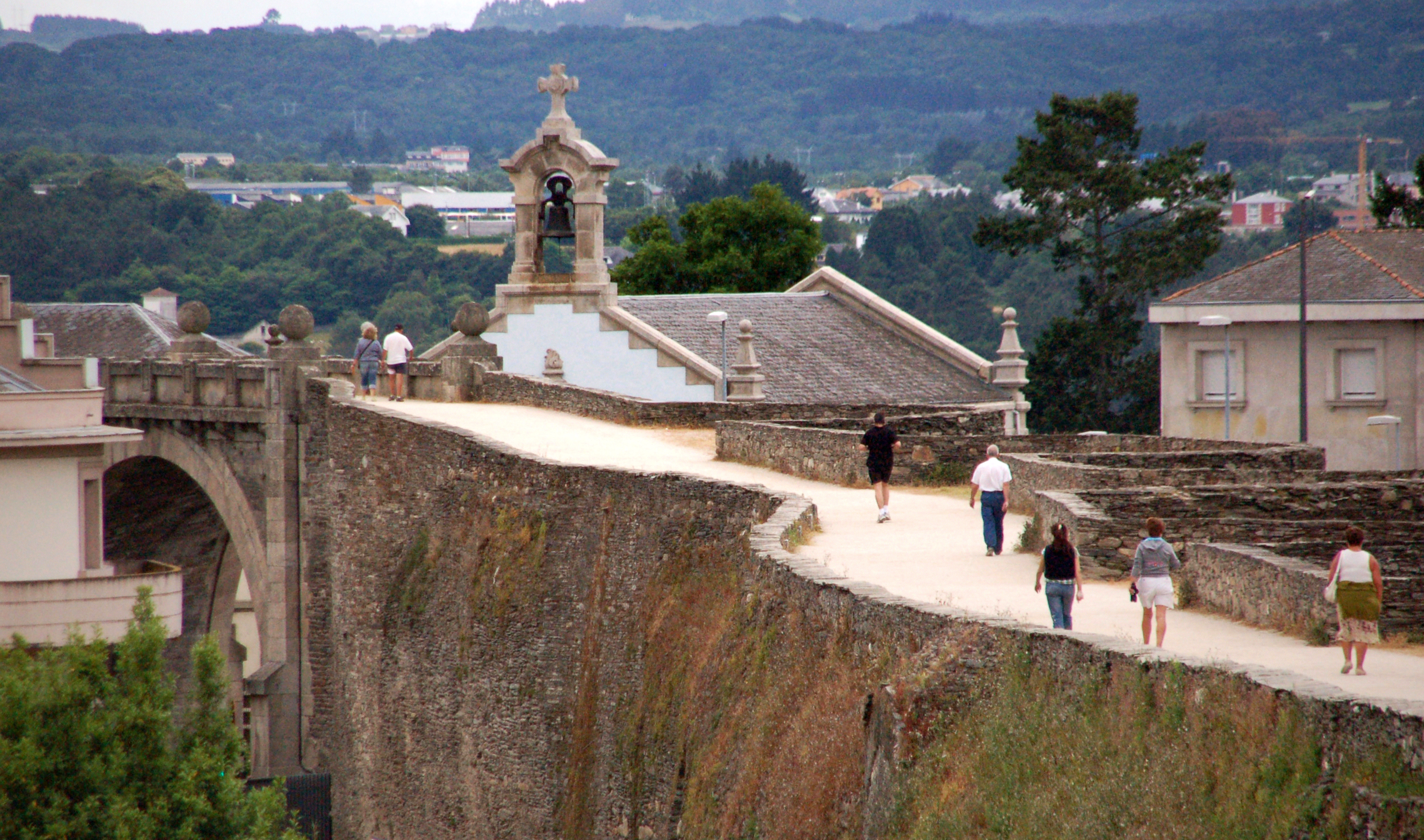
Visitors on the wall

Lugo is the only city in the world to be surrounded by completely intact Roman walls, which reach a height of 10 to 15 metres along a 2117 m circuit ringed with 71 towers. The walk along the top is continuous round the circuit, and features ten gates. These 3rd century walls are protected by UNESCO as a World Heritage Site. The bridge over the Miño is essentially of Roman date, though many repairs over the centuries have effaced its Roman character.

Other sources suggest that the name Lucus Augusti comes from the Latin word Lucus, which means "sacred grove", or "sacred forest", as the city was founded on the place of a small grove.

Besides the walls, sights include:

- the Cathedral, dedicated to St. Mary, built about 1129, though the actual main façade and towers date only from 1769. Its elegant stalls were carved by Francisco Mouro in 1624. This cathedral enjoys the privilege of having the Blessed Sacrament perpetually exposed, a fact commemorated in the armorial bearings of the town.
- Convent and church of St. Francis, in Gothic style, with remains of the sober cloister. It currently houses the Museo Provincial, which shows a display of Galician art and other building of the 18th century
- Church of St. Dominic
- City Hall (Casa do Concello in Galician), a large Baroque structure with a mid-18th century façade. Annexed is a clock tower, originally from the 16th century, but rebuilt later.
- Palace of the arts (Círculo das Artes)
- The Roman Bridge over river Miño.
- Rosalía de Castro Park, a 23 ha park in the city center. It has a small pond in the middle and contains many species of trees, like three sequoias.
- Museo Interactivo de Historia de Lugo (MIHL), an interactive museum about the history of the city, made by Nieto Sobejano Arquitectos.

Two important festivals take place in Lugo:

- Saint Froilan festivity, which lasts from 4–12 October, dedicated to the city's patron saint. It's a Fiesta of National Tourist Interest and it's very popular to eat polbo á feira in one of the many stands near Rosalía de Castro park.
- Arde Lucus, festival celebrated in the last weeks of June which revives the Roman and castro past of the city, and which emerged to commemorate the declaration of the city's Roman wall as a World Heritage Site in 2000. In its latest editions it has reached nearly half a million visitors.

== Sports ==
The most popular and known professional team of the city is the basketball team CB Breogán, currently playing in Liga ACB, the first division in Spain, the team has played many seasons in Liga ACB the top Spanish basketball league. The team occupies the 9th position in the historical ranking of that league.

Futsal is also popular in Lugo, represented by Azkar Lugo, which plays in Second División de Futsal, the Spanish second division.

The football team of Lugo is CD Lugo, currently playing in Spanish Primera Federación.

The fifth stage of the 2016 Vuelta a España cycling race finished in Lugo.The 13th stage of the 2024 Vuelta started in the city and ended on the Ancares mountains.

== Twin towns – sister cities ==
Lugo is twinned with:

- Ferrol, Galicia, Spain
- Qinhuangdao, China
- Viana do Castelo, Portugal

== Notable people ==
- María López Sández (born 1973), philologist and essayist

== See also ==
- Diocese of Lugo
- List of Spanish cities
- List of municipalities in Lugo
