= Roman walls of Lugo =

Defensive fortification in Lugo, Spain

- Muralla Romana de Lugo (Spanish)
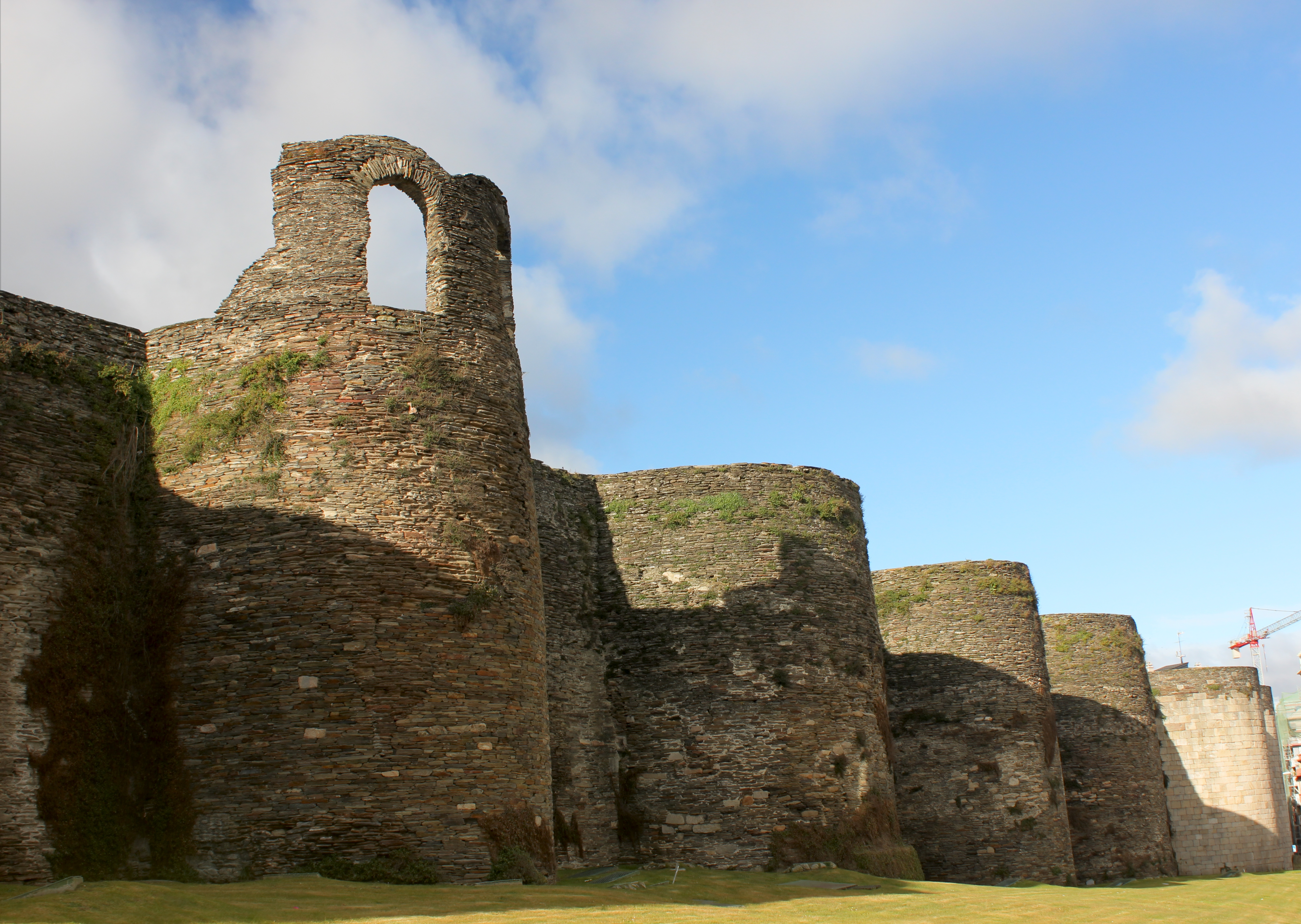
- Interactive map of Roman walls of Lugo
- 43°00′40″N 7°33′12″W
- Type: Roman defensive walls
- Location: Lugo, Spain

UNESCO World Heritage Site
- Type: Cultural
- Criteria: iv
- Designated: 2000 (24th session)
- Reference no.: 987
- Region: Europe and North America
- Area: 1.68 ha (4.2 acres)
- Buffer zone: 59.88 ha (148.0 acres)

Spanish Cultural Heritage
- Type: Non-movable
- Criteria: Monument
- Designated: 16 April 1921
- Reference no.: RI-51-0000191

The Roman walls of Lugo are the ancient Roman defensive walls of the Roman colonia of Lucus Augusti –present-day Lugo, Spain–, in the Roman province of Hispania Tarraconensis. Stretching 2,120 metres (6,960 ft), they were built in the third century AD to defend the ancient Roman town. The fortifications, still largely intact, were declared a UNESCO World Heritage Site in 2000 and are a popular tourist attraction.

== Description ==
=== Walls ===
The city walls were built between 263 and 276 A.D. to defend the Roman town of Lucus Augusti (present-day Lugo) against local tribesmen and Germanic invaders. The walls formed part of a complex of fortifications which also included a moat and an intervallum (the clearing between the walls and the city). The entire length of the walls is around 2,120 metres (6,960 ft), enclosing an area of 34.4 hectares (85 acres). Not all of the town was enclosed by walls: much of the southeastern part of the town remained unprotected, while in other places unused areas were enclosed by walls.

The width of the walls is around 4.2 metres (14 ft) and their height varies between 8 metres (26 ft) and 12 metres (39 ft). The walls consist of internal and external stone facing with a core of earth mixed with gravel, pebbles and worked Roman stone recycled from demolished buildings, cemented with water.

=== Gates ===
There are ten gates in the walls: five dating to Roman times; and five added after 1853 to accommodate the expanding town population. The best preserved original gates are the Porta Falsa and the Porta Miña, the latter still has its original vaulted arch set between two towers. Five stairways and a ramp provide access to the parapet walk over the walls. Within the walls, a number of double staircases provide access to the towers from the parapet walk.

=== Towers ===
Of the original towers, 49 are still intact, and another 39 have partially survived. The towers were built at irregular intervals along the walls. They consist of two storeys and are mostly semicircular; a few are rectangular. The spaces between the towers varies from 5.4 metres (18 ft) to 12.8 metres (42 ft). A mix of materials was used for the construction of the towers. Often the base of the tower was constructed of dressed granite, with the remainder in slate.

== History ==
=== Pilgrim route ===
During the Middle Ages, pilgrims passed through the gates of the Lugo walls, particularly Porta Miña, on their way to Santiago de Compostela.

=== Present day ===
The fortifications were added to UNESCO's World Heritage List in late 2000 as "the finest example of late Roman fortifications in western Europe." The walls have held Spanish monument status (Bien de Interés Cultural) since 1921. In 2007 the walls were twinned with the Great Wall of China during a ceremony attended by China's then-ambassador to Spain, Qiu Xiaoqi.

A walkway over the walls now allows visitors to stroll along the entire length. The town also has a visitor's centre dedicated to the walls, the Centro de Interpretación da Muralla. Since the inscription of the walls on the World Heritage List in 2000, Lugo holds a popular festival called Arde Lucus each year to celebrate its Roman past.

== Gallery ==
Map of the walls showing the location of the 10 gates

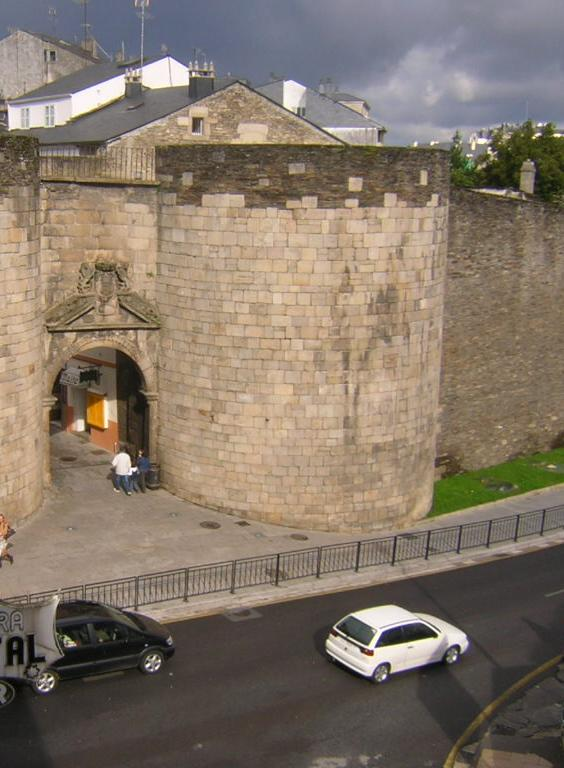
The San Pedro gate, one of the five original Roman gates

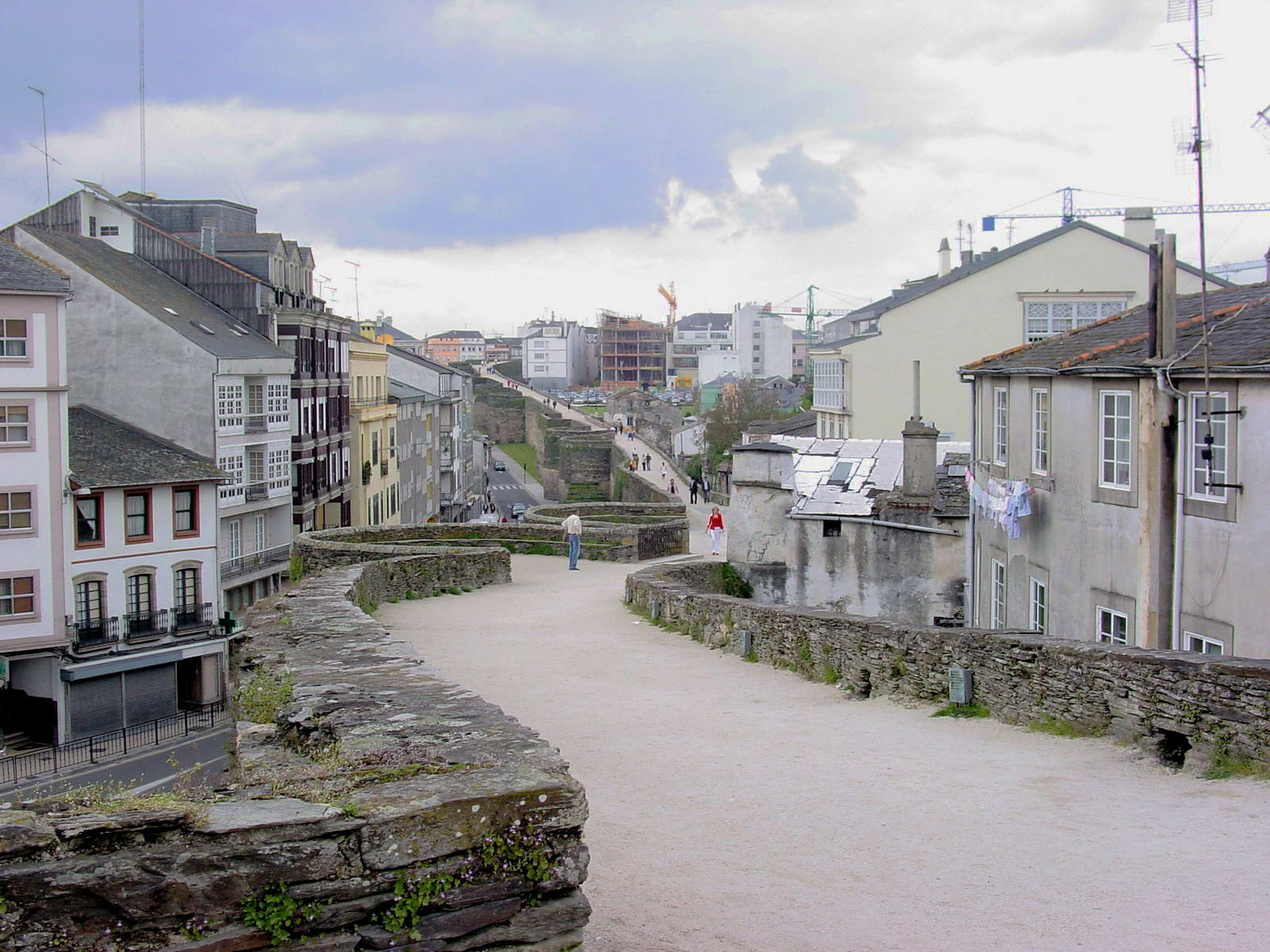
Walkway over the walls

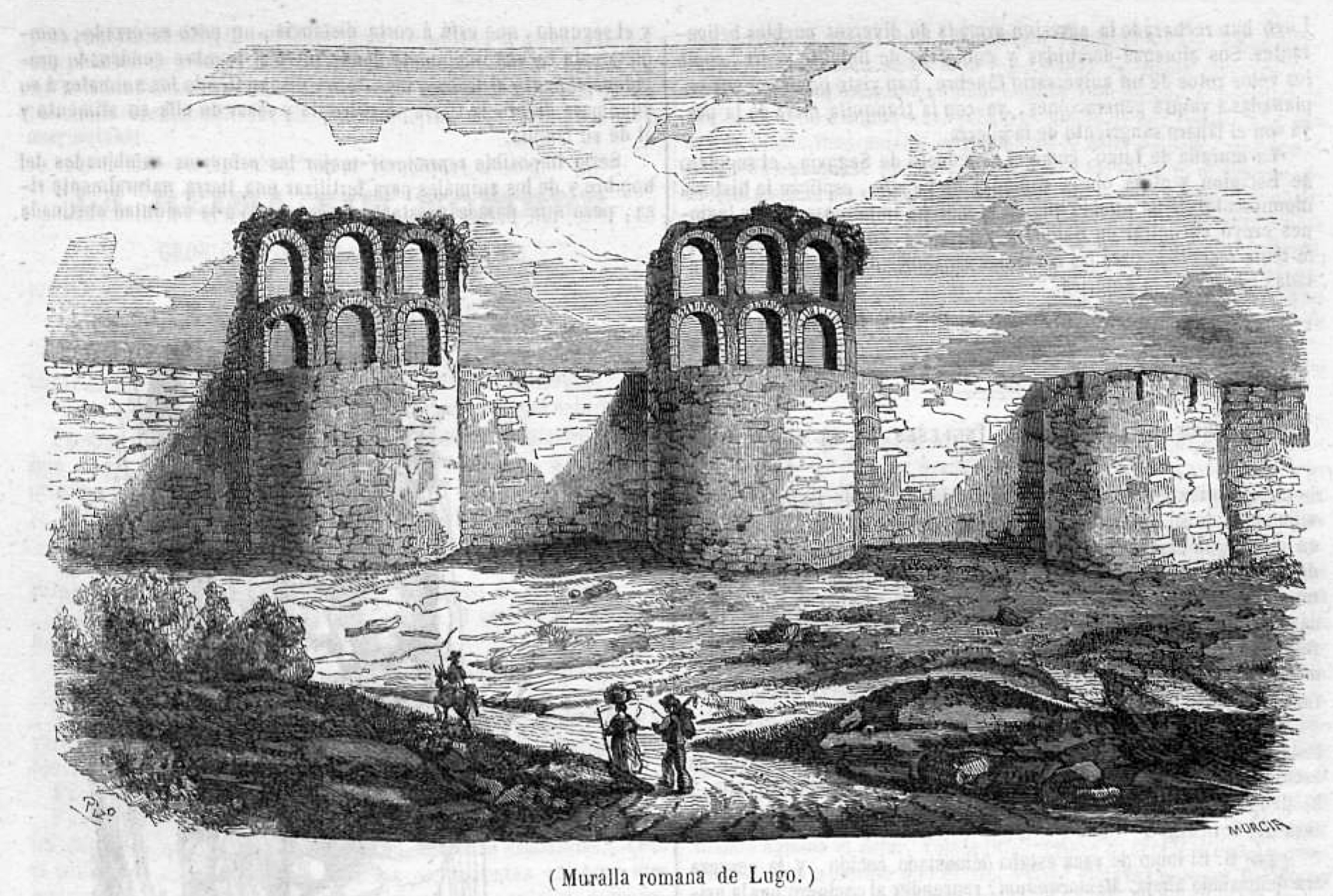
Engraving of 1850 depicting the original windows, published in the Semanario Pintoresco Español

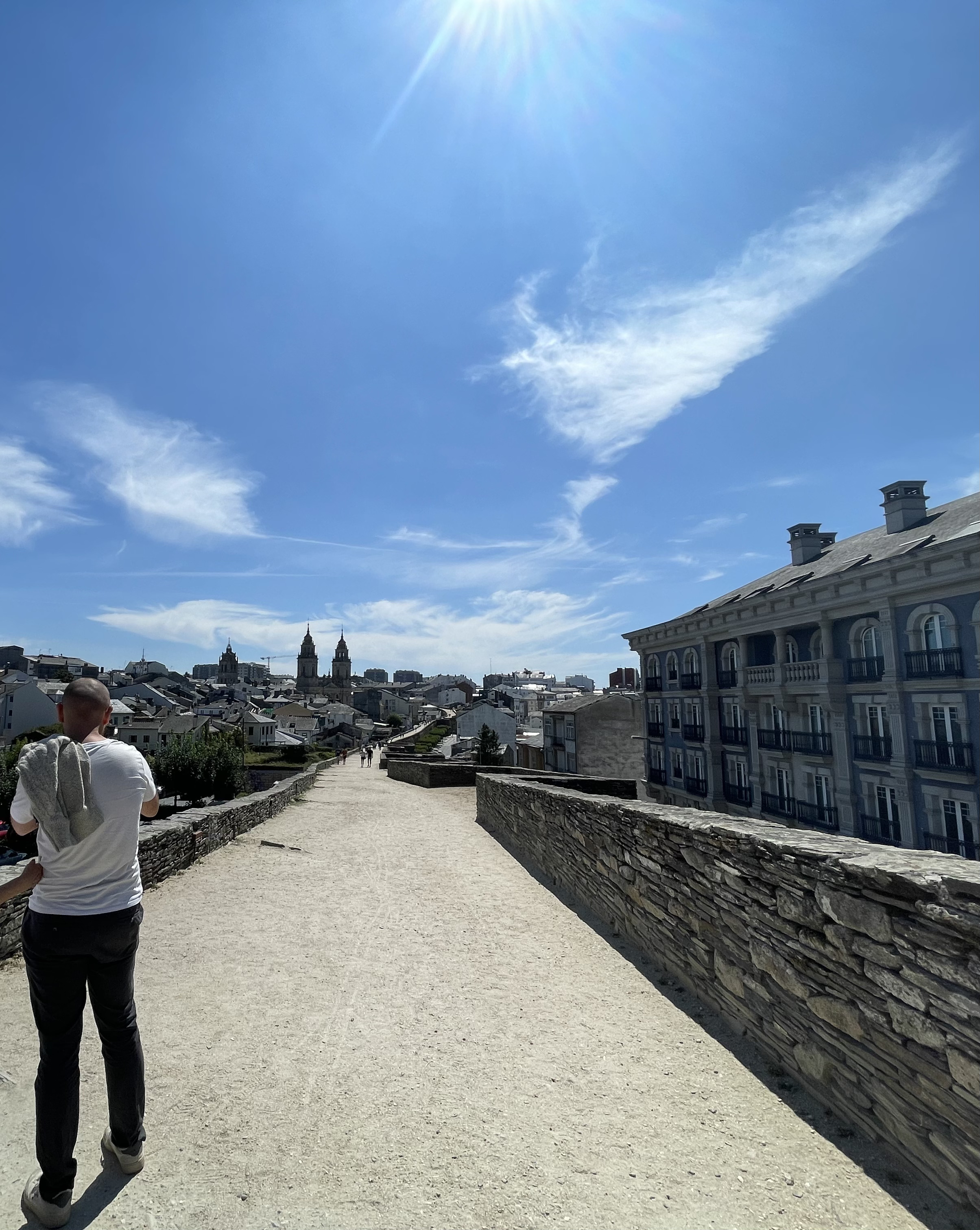
View from the Roman Walls

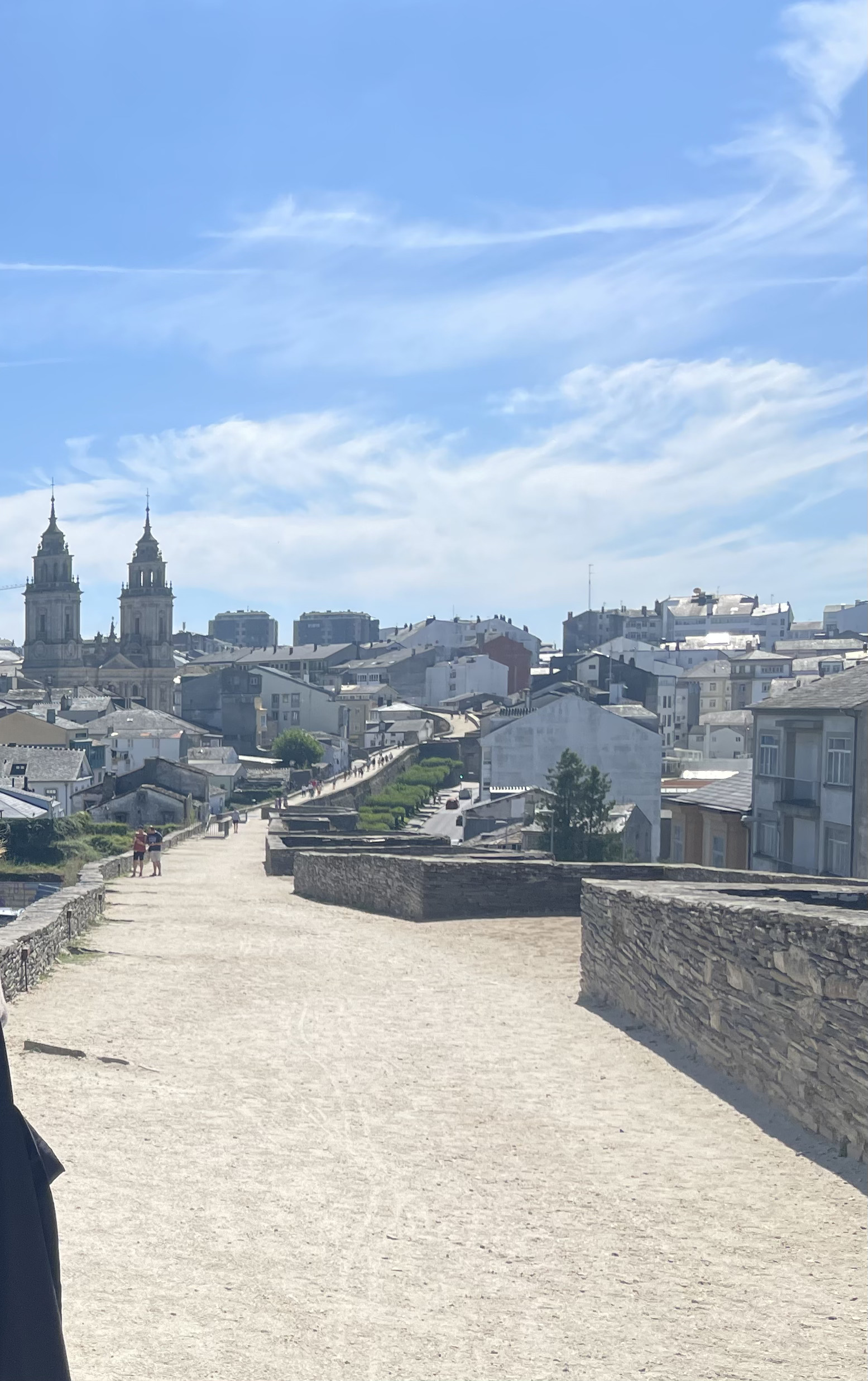
View from the Roman walls

== See also ==
- Roman bridge of Lugo
- List of Roman sites in Spain
- London Wall
- Aurelian Walls
- Servian Wall
