= Sauvé =

Sauvé may refer to:

== People ==
- Arthur Sauvé (1874–1944), Canadian politician
- Bob Sauvé (born 1955), Canadian ice hockey player
- Christopher Lee Sauvé (born 1979), Canadian pop artist
- Clément Sauvé, Canadian comic book artist
- Chris Sauvé, Canadian animator
- Craig Sauvé (born 1981), Canadian politician and musician
- Delpha Sauvé (1901–1956), Canadian politician
- Jean-François Sauvé (born 1960), Canadian ice hockey player
- Jean-Marc Sauvé (born 1949), French civil servant
- Jeanne Sauvé (1922–1993), Canadian politician and journalist
- Julie Sauvé (1952–2020), Canadian synchronized swimming coach
- Louise Sauvé-Cuerrier (born 1926), Canadian educator and politician
- Maurice Sauvé (1923–1992), Canadian politician
- Maxime Sauvé (born 1990), Canadian ice hockey player
- Monique Sauvé, Canadian politician
- Paul Sauvé (1907–1960), Canadian politician
- Paul Sauvé (curler) (1939–2020), Canadian curler
- Philippe Sauvé (born 1980), American ice hockey player
- Pierre Sauvé (1756 – c. July 1822), French-born American planter and politician
- Richard Sauvé (born 1952), Canadian former outlaw biker
- Yann Sauvé (born 1990), Canadian ice hockey player

== Places ==
- Bourassa-Sauvé, Quebec, Canada
- Sauvé (provincial electoral district), Quebec, Canada
- Sauvé's Crevasse, Louisiana, United States

== Other ==
- Sauvé v Canada (Chief Electoral Officer), Canadian supreme court case

== See also ==
- Sauve (disambiguation)
