= History of New Orleans =

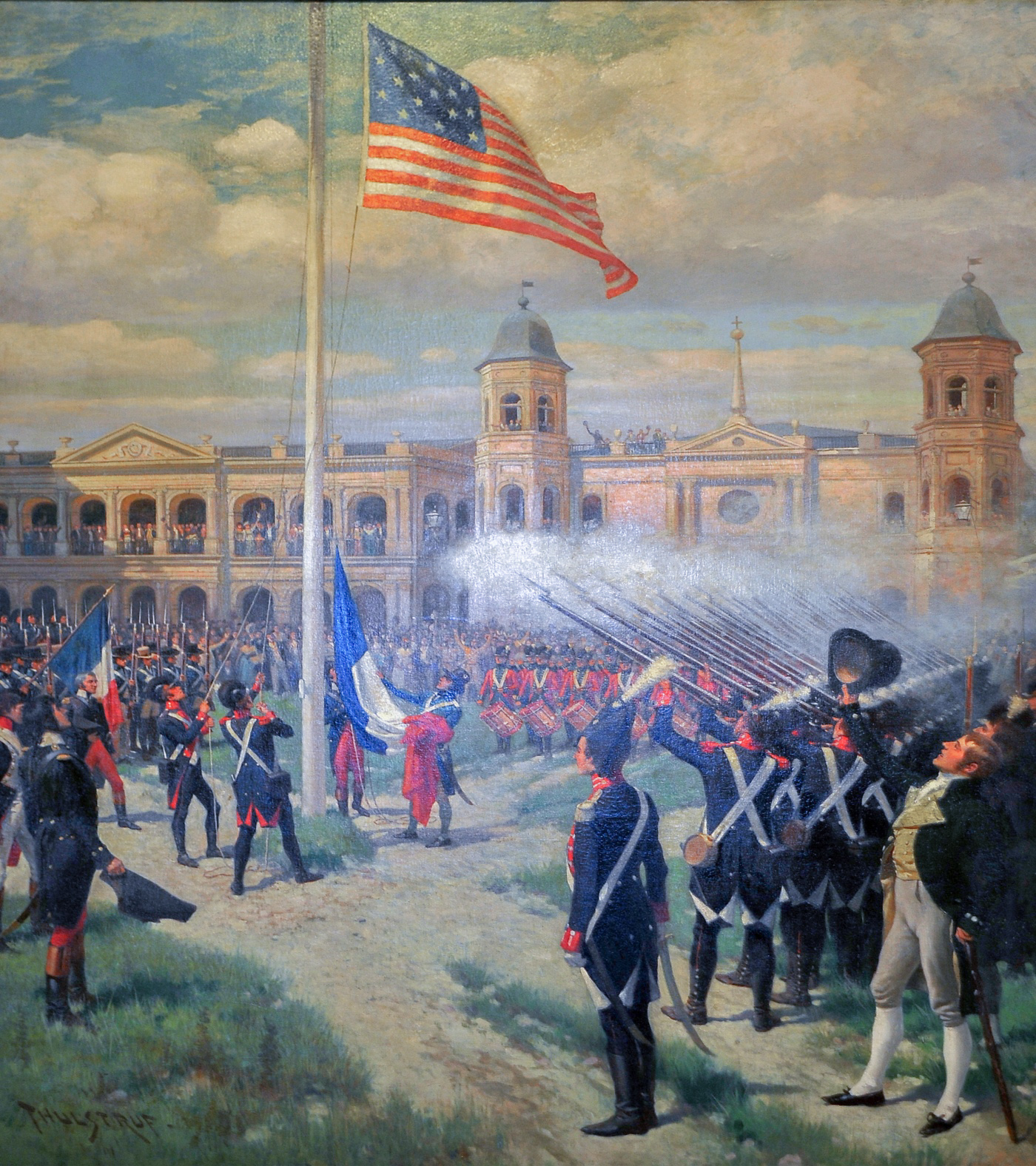
Hoisting of American Colors over Louisiana. The French flag is removed and the American flag is hoisted in the Place d'Armes (now Jackson Square), New Orleans, after the Louisiana Purchase, December 20, 1803. Painting by Thure de Thulstrup commemorating the event's centennial, now in the Louisiana State Museum.

The history of New Orleans, Louisiana traces the city's development from its founding by the French in 1718 through its period of Spanish control, then briefly back to French rule before being acquired by the United States in the Louisiana Purchase in 1803. During the War of 1812, the last major battle was the Battle of New Orleans in 1815. Throughout the 19th century, New Orleans was the largest port in the Southern United States, exporting most of the nation's cotton output and other farm products to Western Europe and New England. As the largest city in the South at the start of the Civil War (1861–1865), it was an early target for capture by Union forces. With its rich and unique cultural and architectural heritage, New Orleans remains a major destination for live music, tourism, conventions, and sporting events and annual Mardi Gras celebrations. After the significant destruction and loss of life resulting from Hurricane Katrina in 2005, the city would bounce back and rebuild in the ensuing years, though it still has not recovered from the loss of much of its original population and the loss of much of the Black population has affected the city's culture that cannot be replicated by the influx of new ethnic and cultural groups post-Katrina.

== Pre-history through Native American era ==
The land mass that was to become the city of New Orleans was formed around 2200 BCE when the Mississippi River deposited silt creating the delta region. Before Europeans colonized the area, it was inhabited by Native Americans for about 1300 years. The Mississippian culture peoples built mounds and earthworks in the area. Later Native Americans created a portage between the headwaters of Bayou St. John (known to the natives as Bayouk Choupique) and the Mississippi River. The bayou flowed into Lake Pontchartrain. This became an important trade route. Archaeological evidence has shown settlement in New Orleans dating back to at least 400 C.E. Bulbancha was one of the original names of New Orleans and means "place of many tongues" in Choctaw. Bulbancha was an important trading hub for thousands of years.

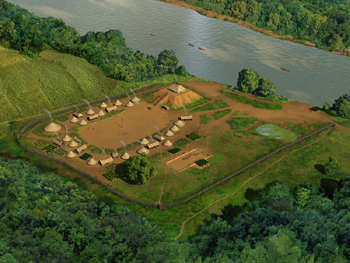

== Colonial era ==
=== First French colonial period ===
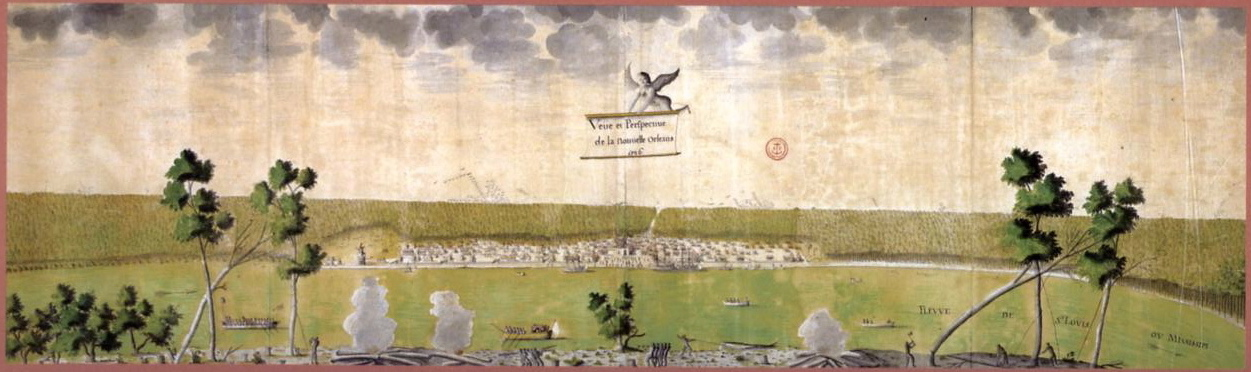
1726 view of the young city of New Orleans from across the Mississippi River.

Historical affiliations
- Kingdom of France (1718–1763)
- Kingdom of Spain (1763–1802)
- French First Republic (1802–1803)
- United States of America (1803–1861)
- State of Louisiana (1861)
- Confederate States of America (1861–1862)
- United States of America (1862–present)

French explorers, fur trappers and traders arrived in the area by the 1690s, some making settlements amid the Native American village of thatched huts along the Bayou. By the end of the decade, the French made an encampment called "Port Bayou St. Jean" near the head of the bayou; this would later be known as the Faubourg St. John neighborhood. The French also built a small fort, "St. Jean" (known to later generations of New Orleanians as "Old Spanish Fort") at the mouth of the bayou in 1701, using as a base a large Native American shell midden dating back to the Marksville culture. In 1708, land grants along the Bayou were given to French settlers from Mobile, but the majority left within the next two years due to the failure of attempts to grow wheat there. These early European settlements are now within the limits of the city of New Orleans, though they predate the city's official founding.

New Orleans was founded in early 1718 by the French as La Nouvelle-Orléans, under the direction of Louisiana governor Jean-Baptiste Le Moyne de Bienville. After considering several alternatives, Bienville selected the site for several strategic reasons and practical considerations, including: it was relatively high ground, along a sharp bend of the flood-prone Mississippi River, which thus created a natural levee (previously chosen as the site of an abandoned Quinipissa village); it was adjacent to the trading route and portage between the Mississippi and Lake Pontchartrain via Bayou St. John, offering access to the Gulf of Mexico port of Biloxi without going downriver 100 miles; and it offered control of the entire Mississippi River Valley, at a safe distance from Spanish and English colonial settlements.

From its founding, the French intended New Orleans to be an important colonial city. The city was named in honor of the then Regent of France, Philip II, Duke of Orléans. The regent allowed Scottish economist John Law to create a private bank and a financing scheme that succeeded in increasing the colonial population of New Orleans and other areas of Louisiana. The scheme, however, created an investment bubble that burst at the end of 1720. Law's Mississippi Company collapsed, stopping the flow of investment money to New Orleans. Nonetheless, in 1722, New Orleans was made the capital of French Louisiana, replacing Biloxi in that role.

The priest-chronicler Pierre François Xavier de Charlevoix described New Orleans in 1721 as a place of a hundred wretched hovels in a malarious wet thicket of willows and dwarf palmettos, infested by serpents and alligators; he seems to have been the first, however, to predict for it an imperial future. Pierre Le Blond de La Tour, the city engineer, in 1717 commenced the public works at the river front to protect the new city from overflows, but it was ten years later that the levee was completed.

In September 1722, a hurricane struck the city, blowing most of the structures down. After this, the administrators enforced the grid pattern dictated by Bienville but hitherto previously mostly ignored by the colonists. This grid plan is still seen today in the streets of the city's "French Quarter" (see map).

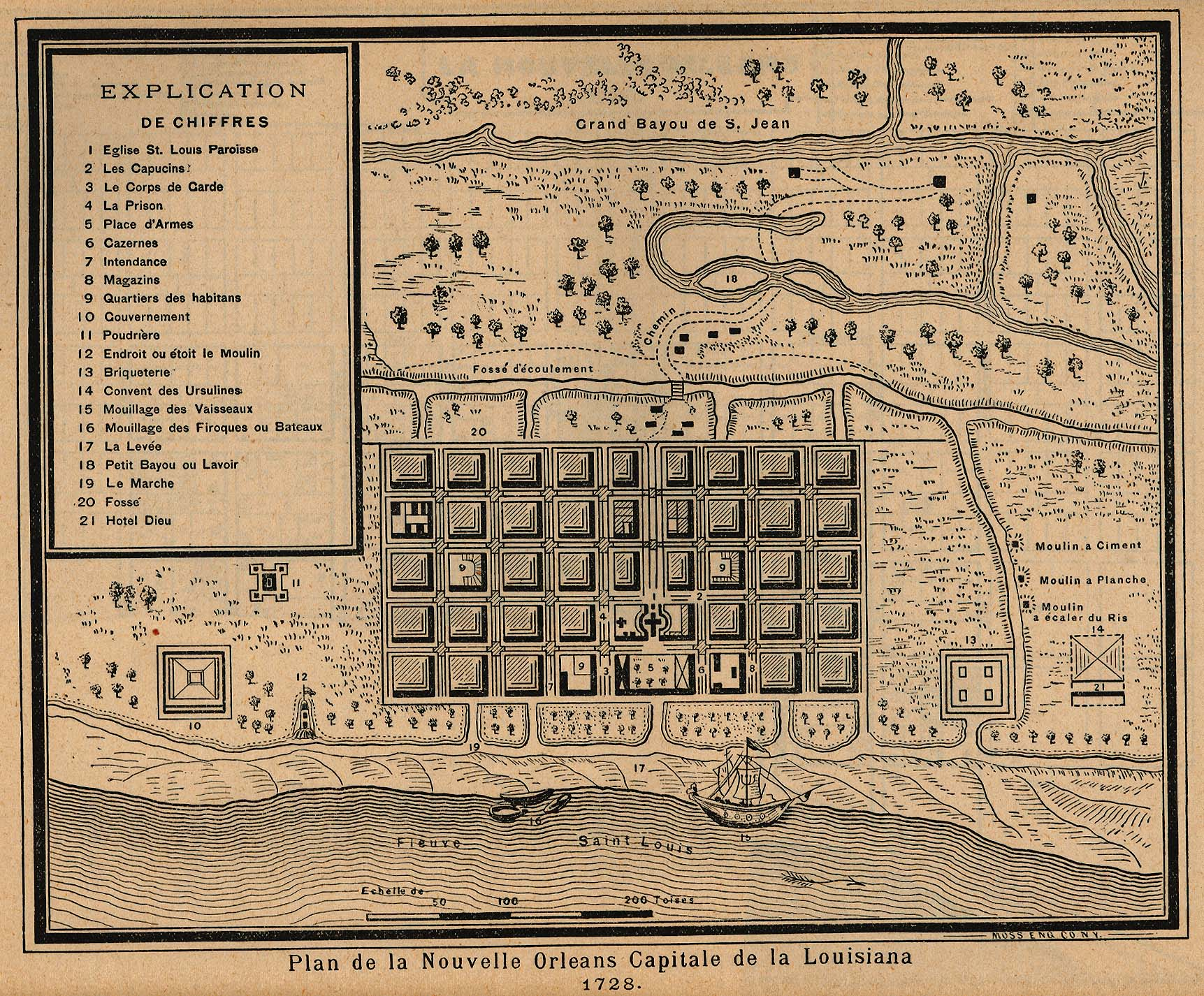
Plan de La Nouvelle-Orléans Capitale de la Louisiane, 1728.

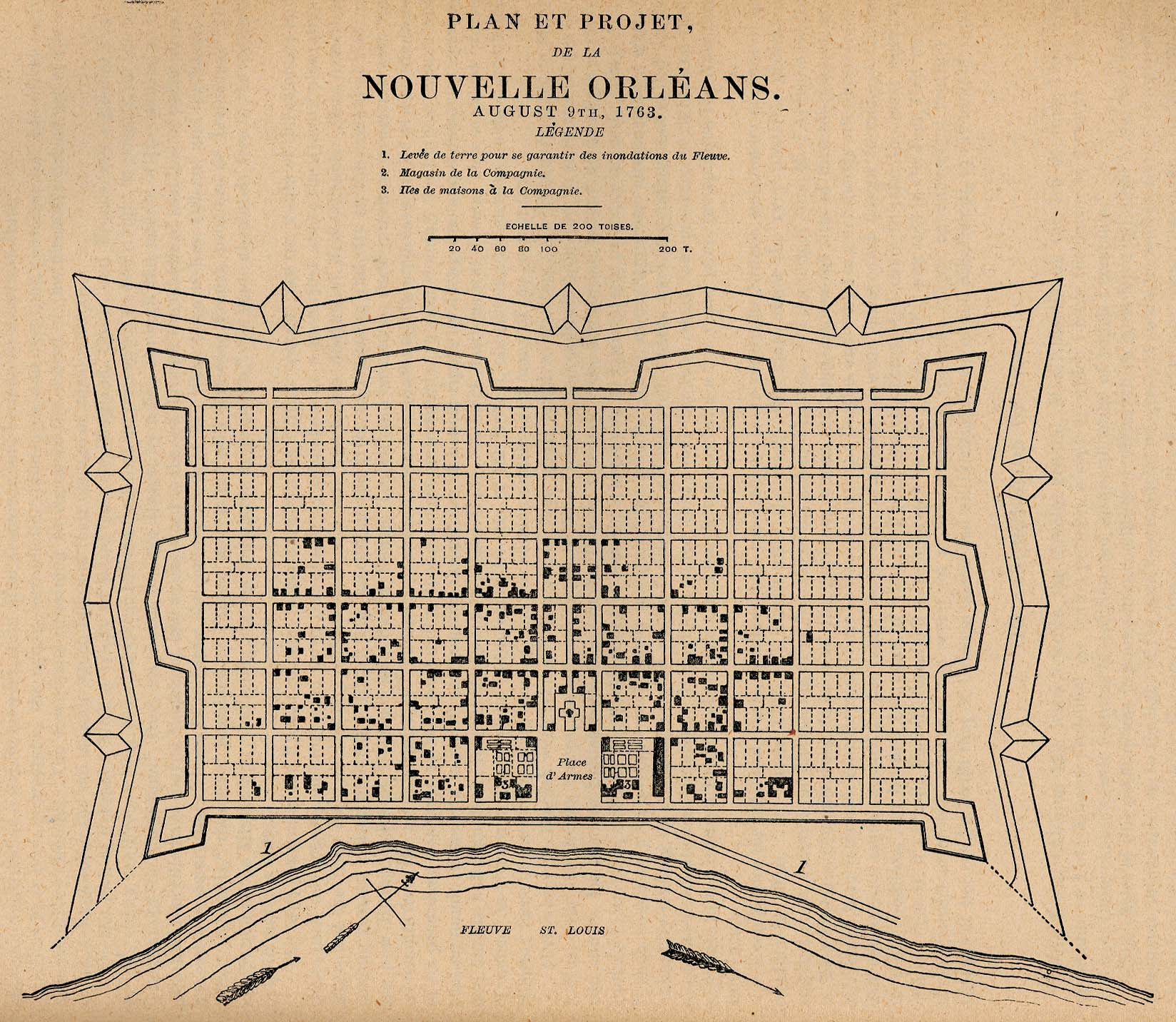
French diagram of New Orleans grid (1763), centered at Place d'Armes (Jackson Square) along the Fleuve St. Louis (Mississippi River).

Much of the colonial population in early days was of the wildest character: deported galley slaves, trappers, gold-hunters; the colonial governors' letters were full of complaints regarding the riffraff sent as soldiers as late as Kerlerec's administration (1753–1763). Shortly after the founding, slaves were required to build the public works of the nascent city for thirty days when the crops had been harvested.

Two large lakes (in reality estuaries) in the vicinity, Lake Pontchartrain and Lake Maurepas, commemorate respectively Louis Phelypeaux, Count Pontchartrain, minister and chancellor of France, and Jean Frederic Phelypeaux, Count Maurepas, minister and secretary of state. A third body of water, Lake Borgne, was originally a land-locked inlet of the sea; its name has reference to its incomplete or defective character.

=== Spanish interregnum ===
In 1763 following Britain's victory in the Seven Years' War, the French colony west of the Mississippi River—plus New Orleans—was ceded to the Spanish Empire as a secret provision of the 1762 Treaty of Fontainebleau, confirmed the following year in the Treaty of Paris. This was to compensate Spain for the loss of Florida to the British, who also took the remainder of the formerly French territory east of the River.

No Spanish governor came to take control until 1766. French and German settlers, hoping to restore New Orleans to French control, forced the Spanish governor to flee to Spain in the bloodless Rebellion of 1768. A year later, the Spanish reasserted control, executing five ringleaders and sending five plotters to a prison in Cuba, and formally instituting Spanish law. Other members of the rebellion were forgiven as long as they pledged loyalty to Spain. Although a Spanish governor was in New Orleans, it was under the jurisdiction of the Spanish garrison in Cuba.

It is a handsome town, the streets which are quite straight...the houses are all surrounded with canals, communicating with each other, and which were thought absolutely necessary for the times, along the quay, on the banks of the river.

— Thomas Kitchin, The Present State of the West-Indies: Containing an Accurate Description of What Parts Are Possessed by the Several Powers in Europe, 1778

In the final third of the Spanish period, two massive fires burned the great majority of the city's buildings. The Great New Orleans Fire of 1788 destroyed 856 buildings in the city on Good Friday, March 21 of that year. In December 1794 another fire destroyed 212 buildings. After the fires, the city was rebuilt with bricks, replacing the simpler wooden buildings constructed in the early colonial period. Much of the 18th-century architecture still present in the French Quarter was built during this time, including three of the most impressive structures in New Orleans—St. Louis Cathedral, the Cabildo and the Presbytere. The architectural character of the French Quarter, including multi-storied buildings centered around inner courtyards, large arched doorways, and the use of decorative wrought iron, were ubiquitous in parts of Spain and the Spanish colonies, although precedents in French colonial and even Anglo-colonial America exist. Spanish influence on the urban landscape in New Orleans may be attributed to the fact that the period of Spanish rule saw a great deal of immigration from all over the Atlantic, including Spain and the Canary Islands, and the Spanish colonies.

In 1795 and 1796, the sugar processing industry was first put upon a firm basis. The last twenty years of the 18th century were especially characterized by the growth of commerce on the Mississippi, and the development of those international interests, commercial and political, of which New Orleans was the center. Within the city, the Carondelet Canal, connecting the back of the city along the river levee with Lake Pontchartrain via Bayou St. John, opened in 1794, which was a boost to commerce.

Through Pinckney's Treaty signed on October 27, 1795, Spain granted the United States "Right of Deposit" in New Orleans, allowing Americans to use the city's port facilities.

=== Retrocession to France and Louisiana Purchase ===
In 1800, Spain and France signed the secret Treaty of San Ildefonso stipulating that Spain give Louisiana back to France, although it had to remain under Spanish control as long as France wished to postpone the transfer of power. There was another relevant treaty in 1801, the Treaty of Aranjuez, and later a royal bill issued by King Charles IV of Spain in 1802; these confirmed and finalized the retrocession of Spanish Louisiana to France.

In April 1803, Napoleon sold Louisiana (New France), which then included portions of more than a dozen present-day states) to the U.S. in the Louisiana Purchase. A French prefect, Pierre Clément de Laussat, who had only arrived in New Orleans on March 23, 1803, formally took control of Louisiana for France on November 30, only to hand it over to the U.S. on December 20, 1803. In the meantime he created New Orleans' first city council, abolishing the Spanish cabildo.

== 19th century ==
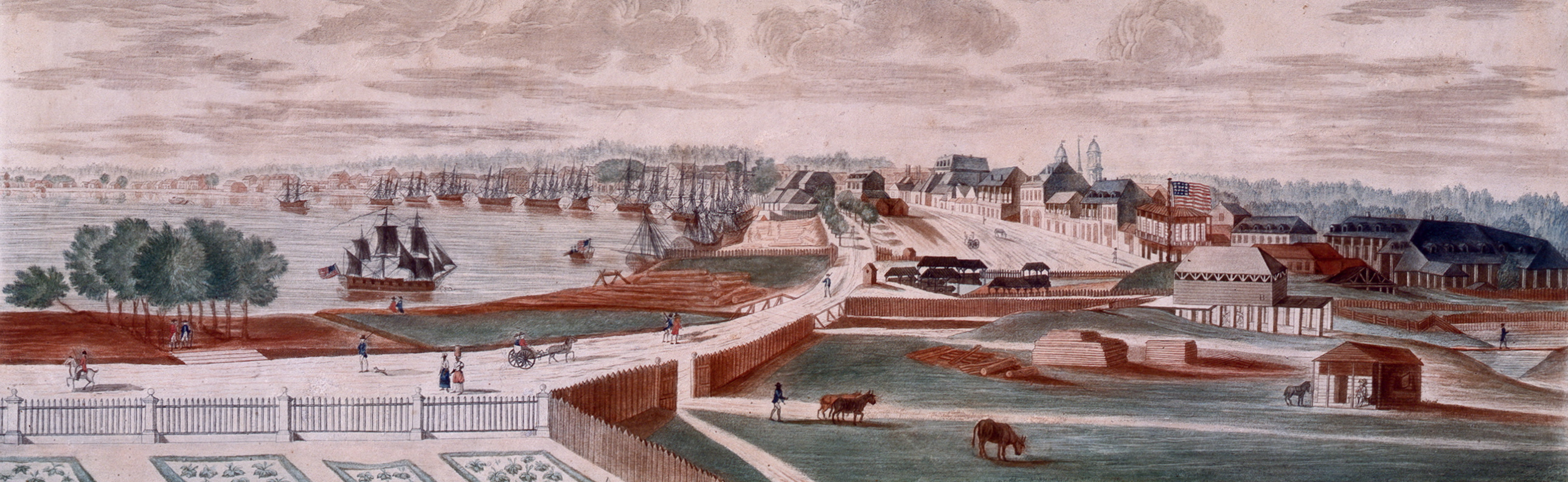
1803 view of New Orleans, looking upriver from the Marigny Plantation House, by J. L. Bouquet de Woiseri

In 1805, a census showed a heterogeneous population of 8,500, comprising 3,551 whites, 1,556 free blacks, and 3,105 slaves. Observers at the time and historians since believe there was an undercount and the true population was about 10,000.

=== Early 19th century: a rapidly growing commercial center ===
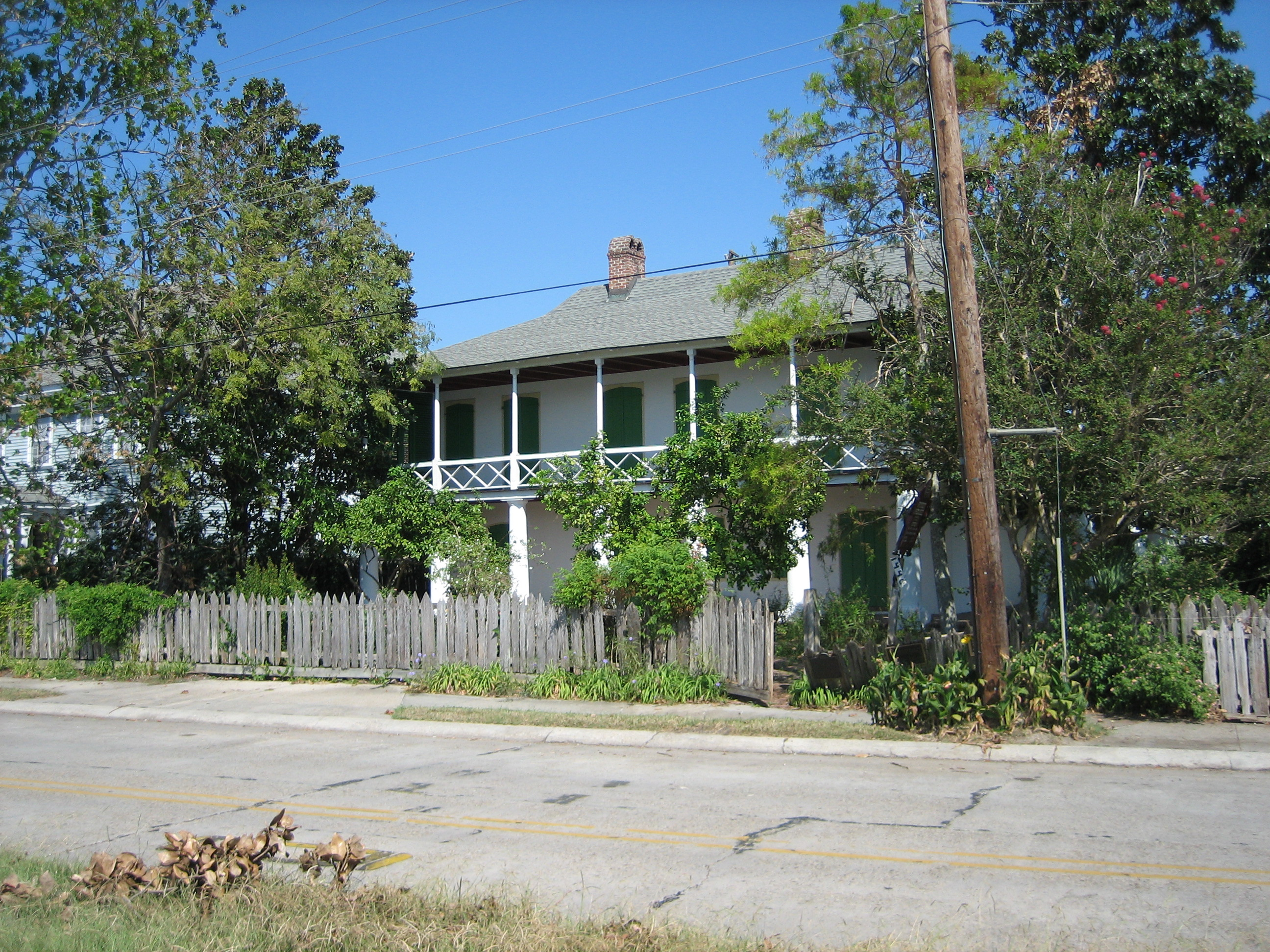
Historic house along Bayou St. John, home of the second mayor of the American city of New Orleans

The next dozen years were marked by the beginnings of self-government in city and state; by the excitement attending the Aaron Burr conspiracy (in the course of which, in 1806–1807, General James Wilkinson practically put New Orleans under martial law); and by the War of 1812. From early days the city was noted for its cosmopolitan polyglot population and mixture of cultures. It grew rapidly, with influxes of Americans, African, French and Creole French (people of French descent born in the Americas) and Creoles of color (people of mixed European and African ancestry), many of the latter two groups fleeing from the violent revolution in Haiti.

The Haitian Revolution (1791–1804) in the former French colony of Saint-Domingue established the second republic in the Western Hemisphere and the first led by blacks. Refugees, both white and free people of color (affranchis or gens de couleur libres), arrived in New Orleans, often bringing slaves with them. While Governor Claiborne and other officials wanted to keep out additional free black men, French Creoles wanted to increase the French-speaking population. As more refugees were allowed into the Territory of Orleans, Haitian émigrés who had gone to Cuba also arrived. Nearly 90 percent of the new immigrants settled in New Orleans. The 1809 migration brought 2,731 whites; 3,102 free persons of African descent; and 3,226 additional enslaved individuals to the city, doubling its French-speaking population. An 1809-1810 migration brought thousands of white francophone refugees (deported by officials in Cuba in response to Bonapartist schemes in Spain).

==== Plantation slaves' rebellion ====
The Haitian Revolution also increased ideas of resistance among the slave population in the vicinity of New Orleans. Early in 1811, hundreds of slaves revolted in what became known as the German Coast Uprising. The revolt occurred on the east bank of the Mississippi River in St. John the Baptist and St. Charles Parishes, Territory of Orleans. While the slave insurgency was the largest in U.S. history, the rebels killed only two white men. Confrontations with militia and executions after locally-held tribunals killed ninety-five black people.

Between 64 and 125 enslaved men marched from sugar plantations near present-day LaPlace on the German Coast toward the city of New Orleans. They collected more men along the way. Some accounts claimed a total of 200 to 500 slaves participated. During their two-day, twenty-mile march, the men burned five plantation houses (three completely), several sugar houses (small sugar cane mills), and crops. They were armed mostly with hand tools.

White men led by officials of the territory formed militia companies to hunt down and kill the insurgents, backed up by the United States Army under the command of Brigadier General Wade Hampton I, a slave owner himself, and by the United States Navy under Commodore John Shaw. Over the next two weeks, white planters and officials interrogated, sentenced, and carried out summary executions of an additional 44 insurgents who had been captured. The tribunals were held in three locations, in the two parishes involved and in Orleans Parish (New Orleans). Executions were by hanging, decapitation, or firing squad (St. Charles Parish). Whites displayed the bodies as a warning to intimidate the enslaved. The heads of some were put on pikes and displayed along the River Road and at the Place d'Armes in New Orleans.

Since 1995 the African American History Alliance of Louisiana has led an annual commemoration in January of the uprising, in which they have been joined by some descendants of participants in the revolt.

==== War of 1812 ====
During the War of 1812, the British sent a large force to conquer the city, which was defeated early in 1815 by Andrew Jackson's combined forces some miles downriver from the city at Chalmette's plantation, during the Battle of New Orleans. The American government managed to obtain early information of the enterprise and prepared to meet it with forces (regular, militia, and naval) under the command of Jackson. Privateers led by Jean Lafitte were also recruited for the battle.

The British advance was made by way of Lake Borgne, and the troops landed at a fisherman's village on December 23, 1814, Major-General Sir Edward Pakenham taking command there two days later (Christmas). An immediate advance on the still insufficiently prepared defenses of the Americans might have led to the capture of the city; but this was not attempted, and both sides limited themselves to relatively small skirmishes and a naval battle while awaiting reinforcements. At last in the early morning of January 8, 1815 (after the Treaty of Ghent had been signed but before the news had reached across the Atlantic), a direct attack was made on the now strongly-entrenched line of defenders at Chalmette, near the Mississippi River. It failed disastrously with 2,000 out of 9,000 British troops engaged becoming casualties, among the dead being Pakenham and Major-General Gibbs. The expedition was soon afterwards abandoned and the troops embarked for England, under the command of John Lambert. Another engagement followed: a ten-day artillery battle at Fort St. Philip on the lower Mississippi River. The British fleet set sail on January 18 and went on to capture Fort Bowyer at the entrance to Mobile Bay.

General Jackson had arrived in New Orleans in early December 1814, having marched overland from Mobile in the Mississippi Territory. His final departure was not until mid-March 1815. Martial law was maintained in the city throughout the period of three and a half months.

==== Antebellum New Orleans ====
The population of the city doubled in the 1830s with an influx of settlers. A few newcomers to the city were friends of the Marquis de Lafayette who had settled in the newly founded city of Tallahassee, Florida, but due to legalities had lost their deeds. One new settler who was not displaced but chose to move to New Orleans to practice law was Prince Achille Murat, nephew of Napoleon Bonaparte. According to historian Paul Lachance, "the addition of white immigrants to the white creole population enabled French-speakers to remain a majority of the white population until almost 1830. If a substantial proportion of free persons of color and slaves had not also spoken French, however, the Gallic community would have become a minority of the total population as early as 1820." Large numbers of German and Irish immigrants began arriving at this time. The population of the city doubled in the 1830s and by 1840 New Orleans had become the wealthiest and third-most populous city in the nation.

By 1840, the city's population was approximately 102,000 and it was now the third-largest in the U.S., the largest city away from the Atlantic seaboard as well as the largest in the South.

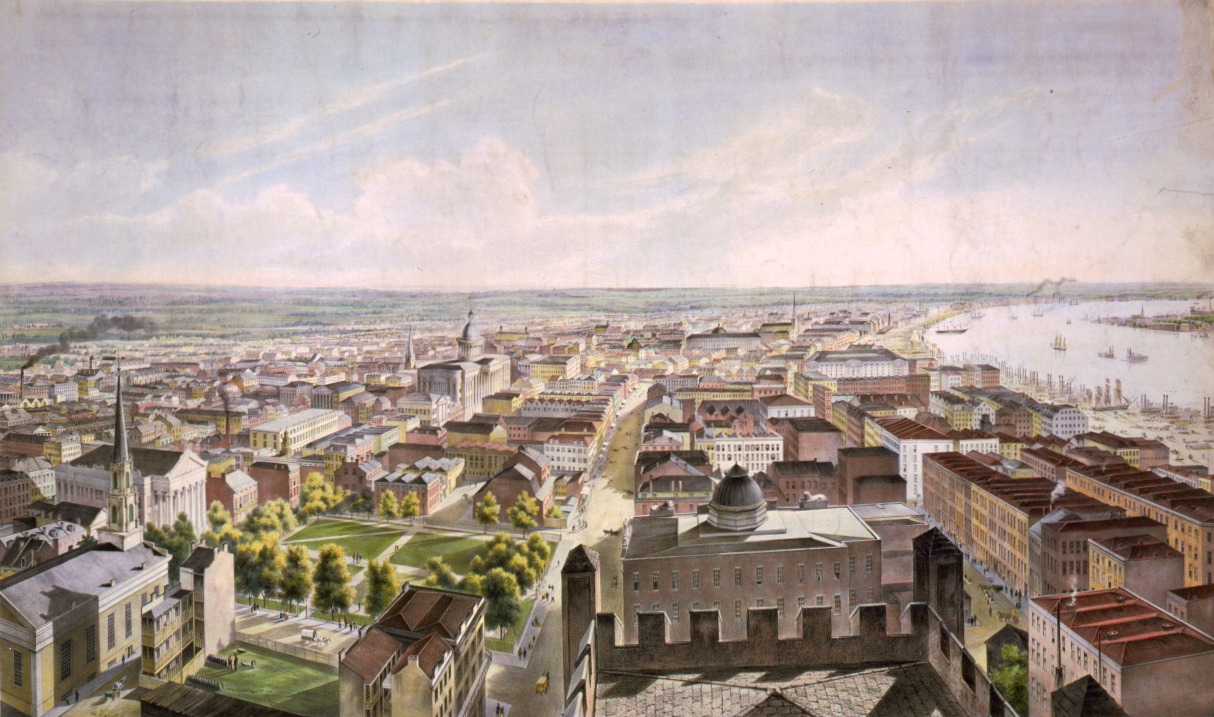
New Orleans lithograph from 1852

The introduction of natural gas (about 1830); the building of the Pontchartrain Rail-Road (1830–31), one of the earliest in the United States; the introduction of the first steam-powered cotton press (1832), and the beginning of the public school system (1840) marked these years; foreign exports more than doubled in the period 1831–1833. In 1838 the commercially-important New Basin Canal opened a shipping route from the Lake to uptown New Orleans. Travelers in this decade have left pictures of the animation of the river trade more congested in those days of river boats, steamers, and ocean-sailing craft than today; of the institution of slavery, the quadroon balls, the medley of Latin tongues, the disorder and carousing of the river-men and adventurers that filled the city. Altogether there was much of the wildness of a frontier town, and a seemingly boundless promise of prosperity. The crisis of 1837, indeed, was severely felt, but did not greatly delay the city's advancement, which continued unchecked until the Civil War. In 1849 Baton Rouge replaced New Orleans as the capital of the state. In 1850 telegraphic communication was established with St. Louis and New York City; in 1851 the New Orleans, Jackson and Great Northern railway, the first railway outlet northward, later part of the Illinois Central, and in 1854 the western outlet, now the Southern Pacific, were begun.

In 1836 the city was divided into three municipalities: the first being the French Quarter and Faubourg Tremé, the second being Uptown (then meaning all settled areas upriver from Canal Street), and the third being Downtown (the rest of the city from Esplanade Avenue on, downriver). For two decades the three Municipalities were essentially governed as separate cities, with the office of Mayor of New Orleans having only a minor role in facilitating discussions between municipal governments.

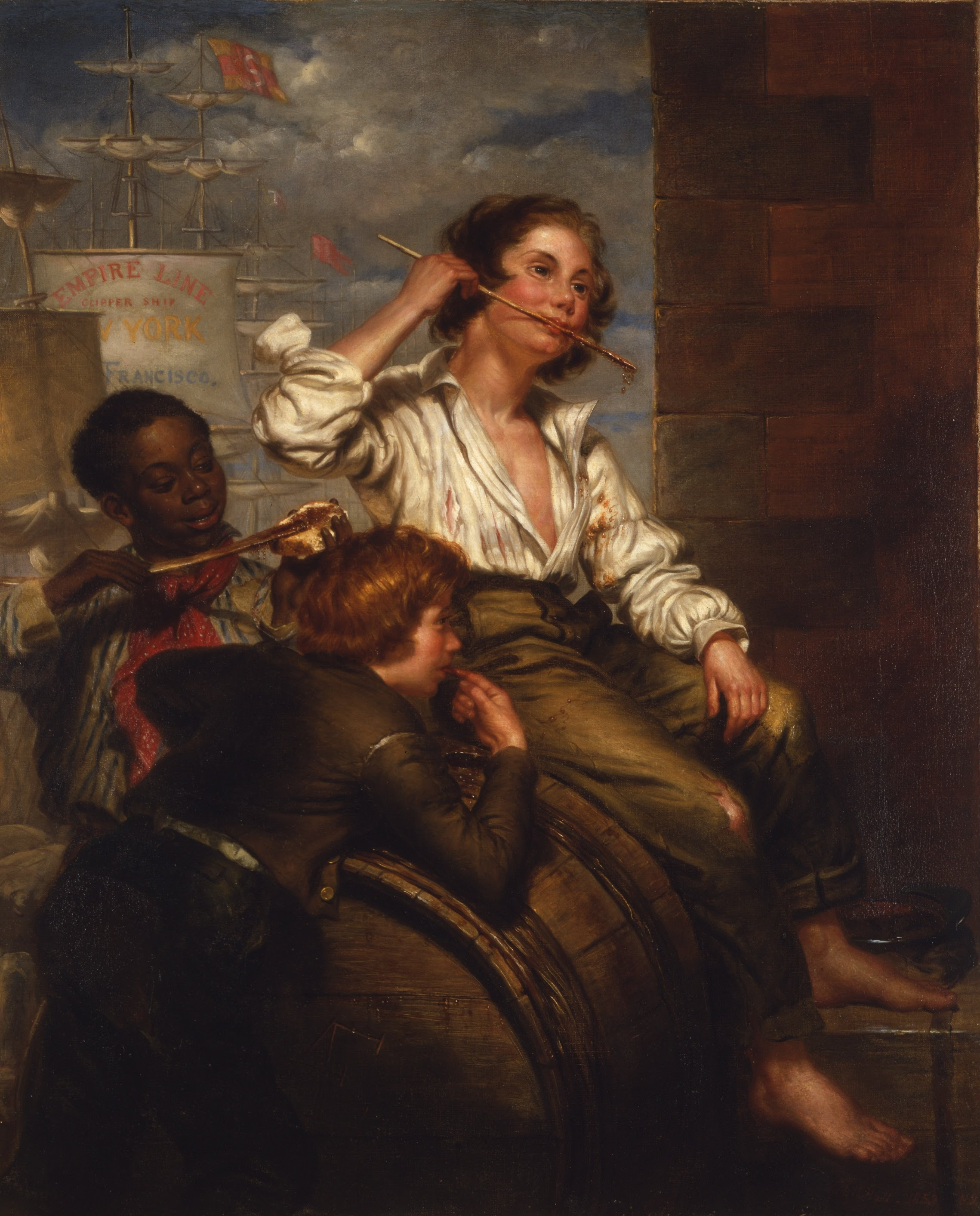
Boys Pilfering Molasses, 1853 painting by George Henry Hall

The importance of New Orleans as a commercial center was reinforced when the United States Federal Government established a branch of the United States Mint there in 1838, along with two other Southern branch mints at Charlotte, North Carolina, and Dahlonega, Georgia. Although there was an existing coin shortage, the situation became much worse because in 1836 President Andrew Jackson had issued an executive order, called a specie circular, which demanded that all land transactions in the United States be conducted in cash, thus increasing the need for minted money. In contrast to the other two Southern branch mints, which only minted gold coins, the New Orleans Mint produced both gold and silver coinage, which perhaps marked it as the most important branch mint in the country.

The mint produced coins from 1838 until 1861, when Confederate forces occupied the building and used it briefly as their own coinage facility until it was recaptured by Union forces the following year.

On May 3, 1849, a Mississippi River levee breach upriver from the city (around modern River Ridge, Louisiana) created the worst flooding the city had ever seen. The flood, known as Sauvé's Crevasse, left 12,000 people homeless. While New Orleans has experienced numerous floods large and small in its history, the flood of 1849 was of a more disastrous scale than any save the flooding after Hurricane Katrina in 2005. New Orleans has not experienced flooding from the Mississippi River since Sauvé's Crevasse, although it came dangerously close during the Great Mississippi Flood of 1927.

==== The slave trade ====
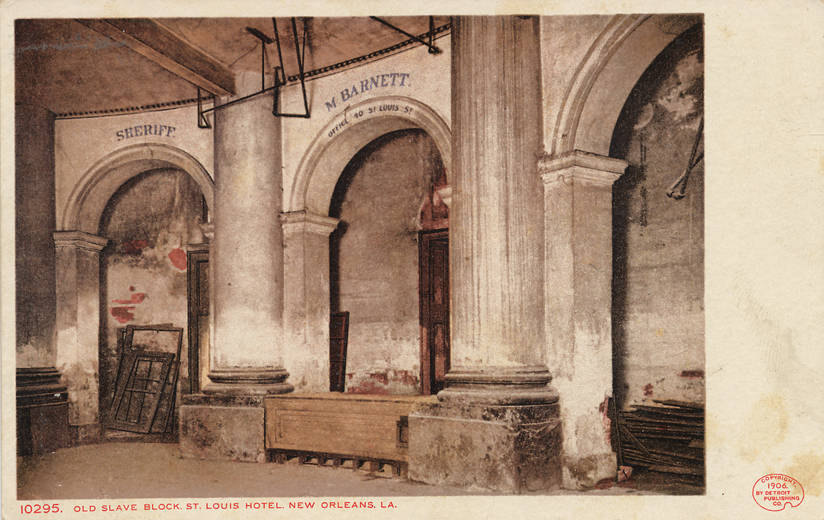
Old Slave Block, St. Louis Hotel

New Orleans was the biggest slave trading center in the country. In the 1840s, there were about 50 people-selling companies. Some whites went to the slave auctions for entertainment. Especially for travelers, the markets were a rival to the French Opera House and the Théâtre d’Orléans. The St. Louis Hotel Slave Market and New Orleans Exchange held important markets. There was great demand for "fancy girls": young women who were kept as concubines.

=== The Civil War ===
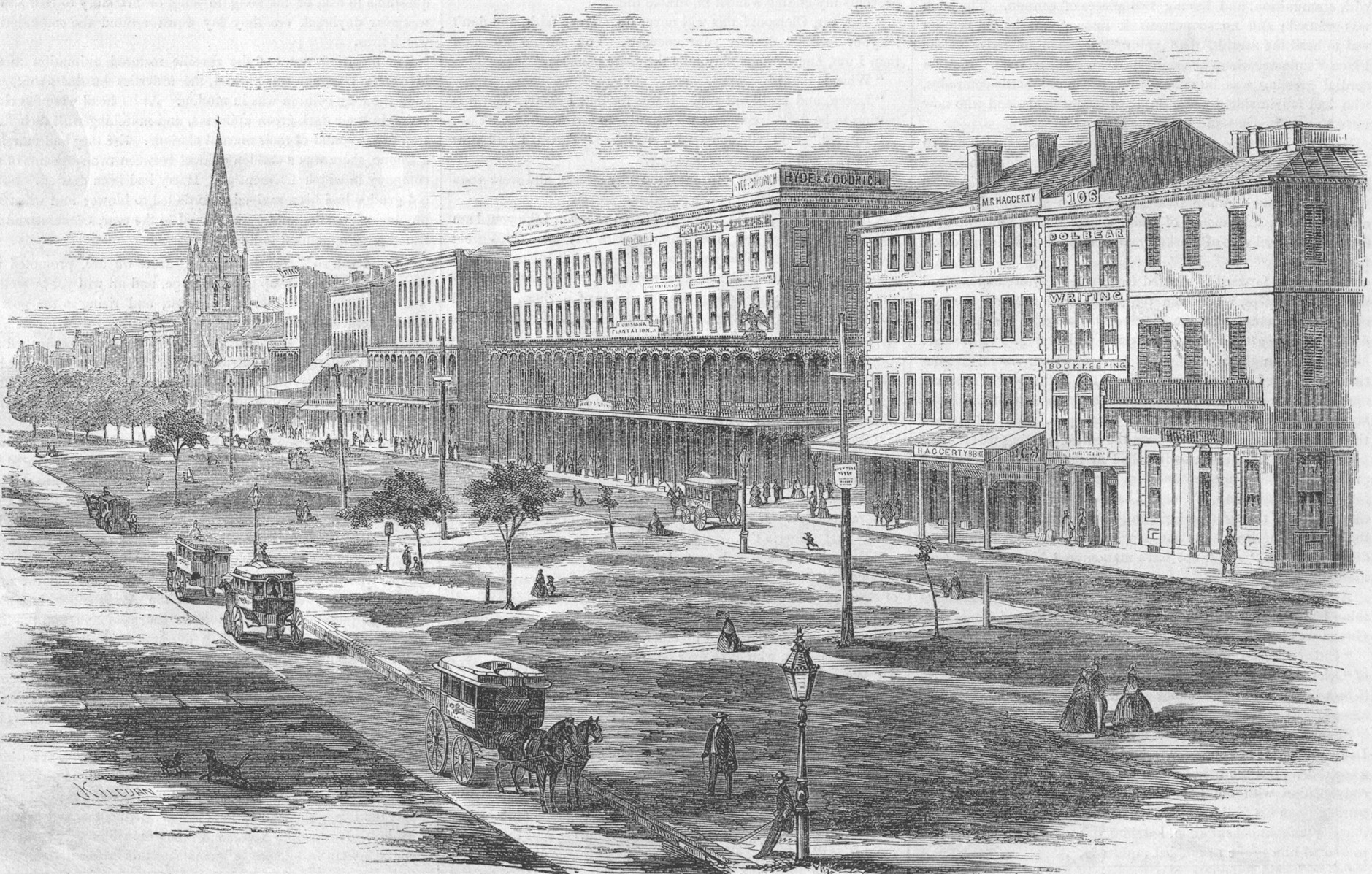
View in Canal Street, New Orleans, 1857

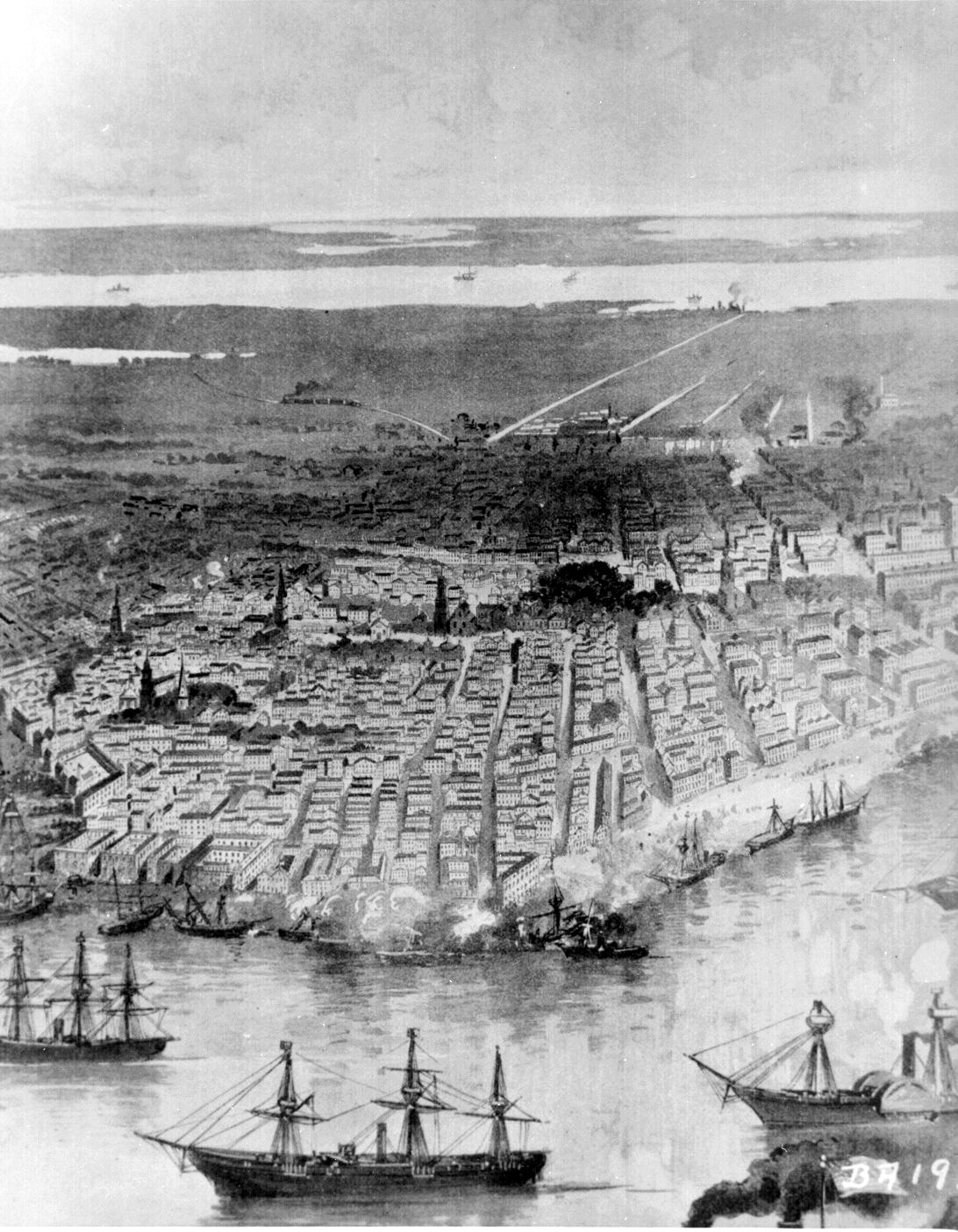
Panoramic View of New Orleans-Federal Fleet at Anchor in the River, c. 1862.

Early in the American Civil War New Orleans was captured by the Union without a battle in the city itself, and hence was spared the destruction suffered by many other cities of the American South. It retains a historical flavor with a wealth of 19th-century structures far beyond the early colonial city boundaries of the French Quarter.

The political and commercial importance of New Orleans, as well as its strategic position, marked it out as the objective of a Union expedition soon after the opening of the Civil War. Elements of the Union Blockade fleet arrived at the mouth of the Mississippi on 27 May 1861. An effort to drive them off lead to the Battle of the Head of Passes on 12 October 1861. Captain D.G. Farragut and the Western Gulf squadron sailed for New Orleans in January 1862. The main defenses of the Mississippi consisted of the two permanent forts, Fort Jackson and Fort St. Philip. On April 16, after elaborate reconnaissances, the Union fleet steamed up into position below the forts and opened fire two days later. Within days, the fleet had bypassed the forts in what was known as the Battle of Forts Jackson and St. Philip. At noon on the 25th, Farragut anchored in front of New Orleans. Forts Jackson and St. Philip, isolated and continuously bombarded by Farragut's mortar boats, surrendered on the 28th, and soon afterwards the military portion of the expedition occupied the city resulting in the Capture of New Orleans.

The commander, General Benjamin Butler, subjected New Orleans to a rigorous martial law so tactlessly administered as greatly to intensify the hostility of South and North. Butler's administration did have benefits to the city, which was kept both orderly and due to his massive cleanup efforts unusually healthy by 19th-century standards. Towards the end of the war General Nathaniel Banks held the command at New Orleans.

=== Late 19th century: Reconstruction and conflict ===
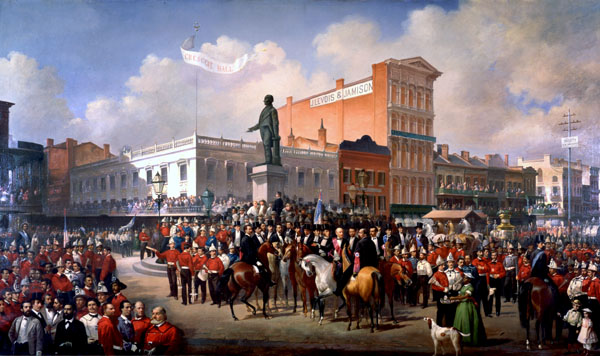
Victor Pierson, Paul Poincy. Volunteer Firemen's Parade, March 4, 1872, representing the gathering of the New Orleans fire brigades around the statue of Henry Clay.

The city again served as capital of Louisiana from 1865 to 1880. Throughout the years of the Civil War and the Reconstruction period the history of the city is inseparable from that of the state. All the constitutional conventions were held here, the seat of government again was here (in 1864–1882) and New Orleans was the center of dispute and organization in the struggle between political and ethnic blocks for the control of government.

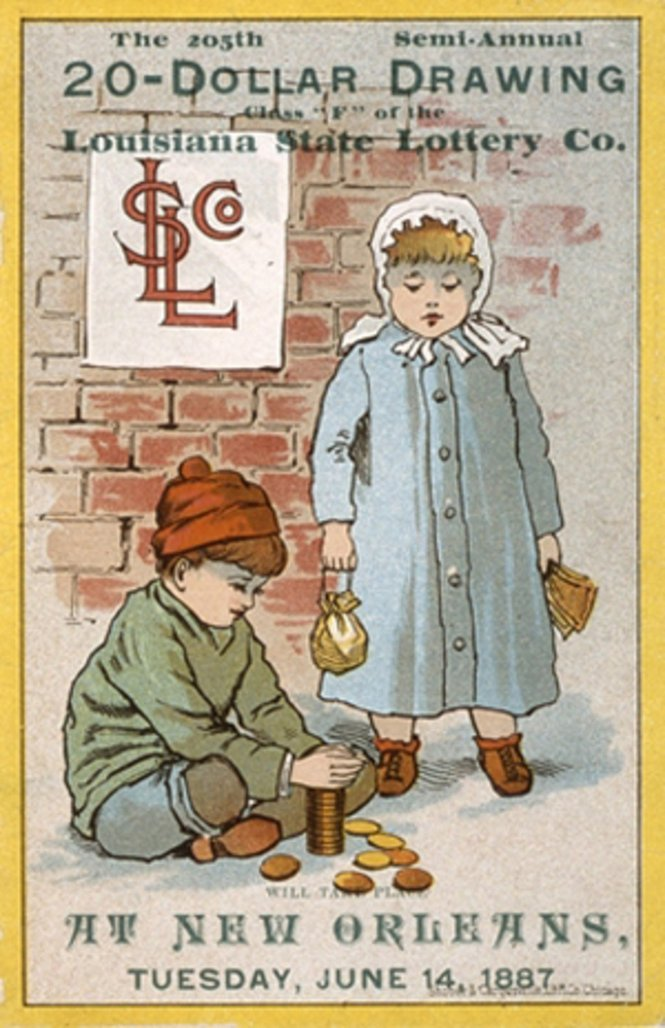
An advertisement for the Louisiana State Lottery drawing from 1887, showing schoolchildren who would presumably benefit from the purchase of lottery tickets.

There was a major street riot of July 30, 1866, at the time of the meeting of the radical constitutional convention. Businessman Charles T. Howard began the Louisiana State Lottery Company in an arrangement which involved bribing state legislators and governors for permission to operate the highly lucrative outfit, as well as legal manipulations that at one point interfered with the passing of one version of the state constitution.

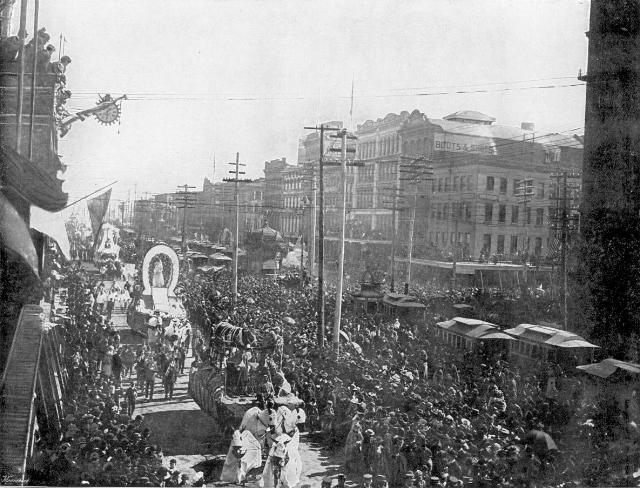
New Orleans Mardi Gras in the early 1890s.

During Reconstruction, New Orleans was within the Fifth Military District of the United States. Louisiana was readmitted to the Union in 1868, and its Constitution of 1868 granted universal manhood suffrage. Both blacks and whites were elected to local and state offices. In 1872, then-lieutenant governor P.B.S. Pinchback succeeded Henry Clay Warmouth as governor of Louisiana, becoming the first non-white governor of a U.S. state, and the last African American to lead a U.S. state until Douglas Wilder's election in Virginia, 117 years later. In New Orleans, Reconstruction was marked by the Mechanics Institute race riot (1866). The city operated successfully a racially integrated public school system. Damage to levees and cities along the Mississippi River adversely affected southern crops and trade for the port city for some time, as the government tried to restore infrastructure. The nationwide Panic of 1873 also slowed economic recovery.

In the 1850s white Francophones had remained an intact and vibrant community, maintaining instruction in French in two of the city's four school districts. As the Creole elite feared, during the war, their world changed. In 1862, the Union general Ben Butler abolished French instruction in schools, and statewide measures in 1864 and 1868 further cemented the policy. By the end of the 19th century, French usage in the city had faded significantly.

New Orleans annexed the city of Algiers, Louisiana, across the Mississippi River, in 1870. The city also continued to expand upriver, annexing the town of Carrollton, Louisiana in 1874.

On September 14, 1874, armed forces led by the White League defeated the integrated Republican metropolitan police and their allies in pitched battle in the French Quarter and along Canal Street. The White League forced the temporary flight of the William P. Kellogg government, installing John McEnery as Governor of Louisiana. Kellogg and the Republican administration were reinstated in power 3 days later by United States troops. Early 20th century segregationists would celebrate the short-lived triumph of the White League as a victory for "white supremacy" and dubbed the conflict "The Battle of Liberty Place". A monument commemorating the event was built near the foot of Canal Street, to the side of the Aquarium near the trolley tracks. This monument was removed on April 24, 2017. The removal fell on the same day that three states—Alabama, Mississippi, and Georgia—observed what is known as Confederate Memorial Day.

U.S. troops also blocked the White League Democrats in January 1875, after they had wrested from the Republicans the organization of the state legislature. Nevertheless, the revolution of 1874 is generally regarded as the independence day of Reconstruction, although not until President Hayes withdrew the troops in 1877 and the Packard government fell did the Democrats actually hold control of the state and city. The financial condition of the city when the whites gained control was very bad. The tax-rate had risen in 1873 to 3%. The city defaulted in 1874. On the interest of its bonded debt, it later refunded this ($22,000,000 in 1875) at a lower rate, to decrease the annual charge from $1,416,000 to $307,500.

The New Orleans Mint was reopened in 1879, minting mainly silver coinage, including the famed Morgan silver dollar from 1879 to 1904.

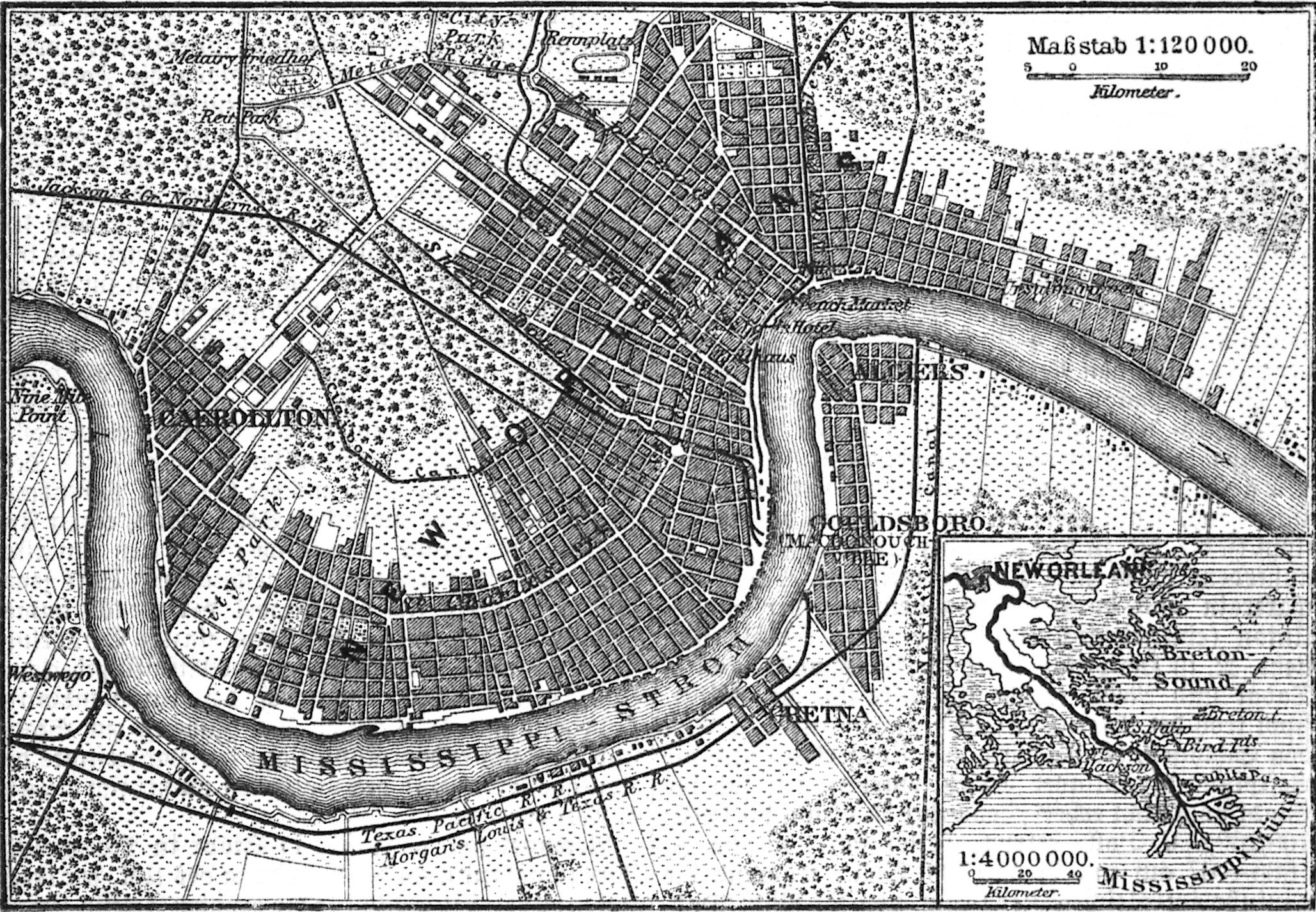
1890 German map of New Orleans, with surrounding communities of Algiers, Carrollton, Gretna.

The city suffered flooding in 1882.

The city hosted the 1884 World's Fair, called the World Cotton Centennial. A financial failure, the event is notable as the beginnings of the city's tourist economy.

An electric lighting system was introduced to the city in 1886; limited use of electric lights in a few areas of town had preceded this by a few years.

=== 1890s ===
On October 15, 1890, Chief-of-Police David C. Hennessy was shot, and reportedly his dying words informed a colleague that he was shot by "Dagos", an insulting term for Italians. On March 13, 1891, a group of Italian Americans on trial for the shooting were acquitted. However, a mob stormed the jail and lynched eleven Italian-Americans. Local historians still debate whether some of those lynched were connected to the Mafia, but most agree that a number of innocent people were lynched during the Chief Hennessy Riot. The government of Italy protested, as some of those lynched were still Italian citizens, and the government of the U.S. eventually paid reparations to Italy.

In the 1890s much of the city's public transportation system, hitherto relying on mule-drawn streetcars on most routes supplemented by a few steam locomotives on longer routes, was electrified.

With a relatively large educated black (including a self-described "Creole" or mixed-race) population that had long interacted with the white population, racial attitudes were comparatively liberal for the Deep South. For example, there was the 1892 New Orleans general strike that began on November 8, 1892. But, like other southern cities and towns, African Americans were barred from a range of employment possibilities, including police officers, and firefighters. No black child was allowed an education at a public high school in the city. From hotels, parks, museums and restaurants, black citizens were denied access through a rigid system of Jim Crow, but some in the city objected to the State of Louisiana's attempt to enforce strict racial segregation, and hoped to overturn the law with a test case in 1892. The case found its way to the U.S. Supreme Court in 1896 as Plessy v. Ferguson. This resulted in upholding segregation, which would be enforced with ever-growing strictness for more than half a century.

In 1892, the New Orleans political machine, "the Ring," won a sweeping victory over the incumbent reformers. John Fitzpatrick, leader of the working class Irish, became mayor. In 1896 Mayor Fitzpatrick proposed combining existing library resources to create the city's first free public library, the Fisk Free and Public Library. This entity later became known as the New Orleans Public Library.

In the spring of 1896 Mayor Fitzpatrick, leader of the city's Bourbon Democratic organization, left office after a scandal-ridden administration, his chosen successor badly defeated by reform candidate Walter C. Flower. But Fitzpatrick and his associates quickly regrouped, organizing themselves on 29 December into the Choctaw Club, which soon received considerable patronage from Louisiana governor and Fitzpatrick ally Murphy Foster. Fitzpatrick, a power at the 1898 Louisiana Constitutional Convention, was instrumental in exempting immigrants from the new educational and property requirements designed to disenfranchise blacks. In 1899 he managed the successful mayoral campaign of Bourbon candidate Paul Capdevielle.

In 1897 the quasi-legal red light district called Storyville opened and soon became a famous attraction of the city.

The Robert Charles Riots occurred in July 1900. Well-armed African-American Robert Charles held off a group of policemen who came to arrest him for days, killing several of them. A White mob started a race riot, terrorizing and killing a number of African Americans unconnected with Charles. The riots were stopped when a group of White businessmen quickly printed and nailed up flyers saying that if the rioting continued they would start passing out firearms to the black population for their self-defense.

== Epidemics ==
Yellow fever epidemics threatened New Orleans from 1817 through 1905. Striking hard in the summer and early autumn (between July and August), the worst of these epidemics killed about 8,000 people in 1853. Symptoms included chills, fever, nausea, and sometimes even more acute symptoms, such as delirium and vomiting blood. What was unknown through most of the nineteenth-century was the cause. Mosquitos spread yellow fever.

The population of New Orleans and other settlements in south Louisiana suffered from epidemics of yellow fever, malaria, cholera, and smallpox, beginning in the late 18th century and periodically throughout the 19th century. Doctors did not understand how the diseases were transmitted; primitive sanitation and lack of a public water system contributed to public health problems, as did the highly transient population of sailors and immigrants. The city successfully suppressed a final outbreak of yellow fever in 1905. (See below, 20th century.)

== Progressive era drainage ==
Until the early 20th century, construction was largely limited to the slightly higher ground along old natural river levees and bayous; the largest section of this being near the Mississippi River front. This gave the 19th-century city the shape of a crescent along a bend of the Mississippi, the origin of the nickname The Crescent City. Between the developed higher ground near the Mississippi and the shores of Lake Pontchartrain, most of the area was wetlands only slightly above the level of Lake Pontchartrain and sea level. This area was commonly referred to as the "back swamp," or areas of cypress groves as "the back woods." While there had been some use of this land for cow pasture and agriculture, the land was subject to frequent flooding, making what would otherwise be valuable land on the edge of a growing city unsuitable for development. The levees protecting the city from high water events on the Mississippi and Lake compounded this problem, as they also kept rainwater in, which tended to concentrate in the lower areas. 19th century steam pumps were set up on canals to push the water out, but these early efforts proved inadequate to the task.

Following studies begun by the Drainage Advisory Board and the Sewerage and Water Board of New Orleans in the 1890s, in the 1900s and 1910s engineer and inventor A. Baldwin Wood enacted his ambitious plan to drain the city, including large pumps of his own design that are still used when heavy rains hit the city. Wood's pumps and drainage allowed the city to expand greatly in area.

It only became clear decades later that the problem of subsidence had been underestimated. Much of the land in what had been the old back swamp has continued to slowly sink, and many of the neighborhoods developed after 1900 are now below sea level.

== 20th century ==
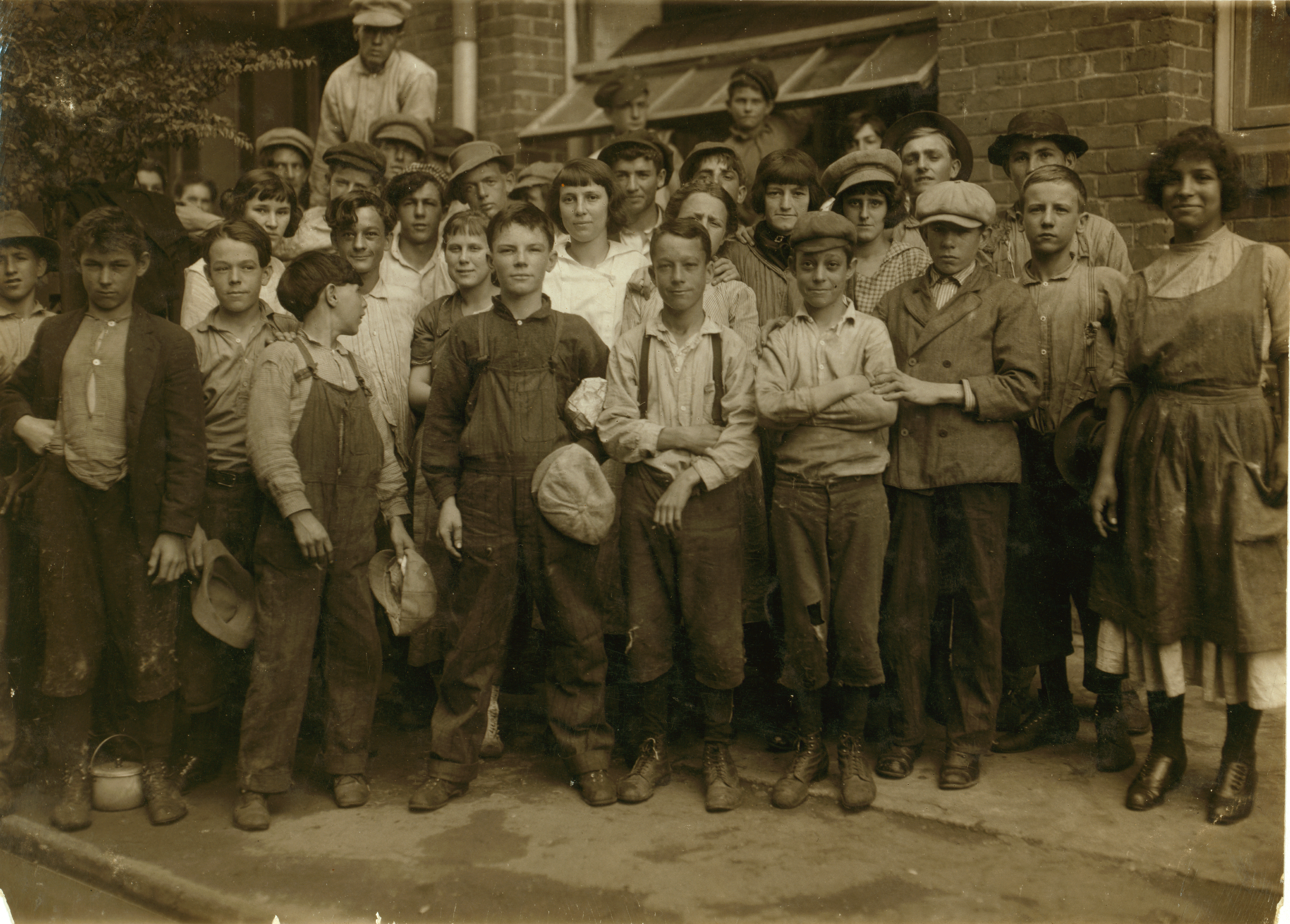
Child labor at Lane Cotton Mill, 1913. Photo by Lewis Hine.

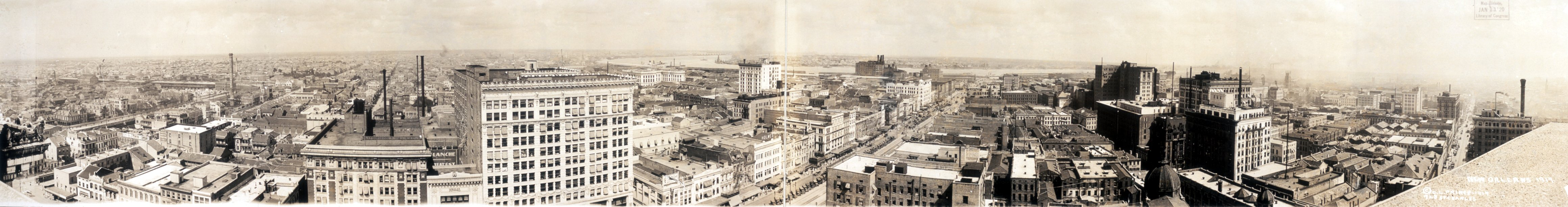
New Orleans panorama from 1919

In the early part of the 20th century the Francophone character of the city was still much in evidence, with one 1902 report describing "one-fourth of the population of the city speaks French in ordinary daily intercourse, while another two-fourths is able to understand the language perfectly." As late as 1945, one still encountered elderly Creole women who spoke no English. The last major French language newspaper in New Orleans, L'Abeille de la Nouvelle-Orléans, ceased publication on December 27, 1923, after ninety-six years; according to some sources Le Courrier de la Nouvelle Orleans continued until 1955.

In 1905, yellow fever was reported in the city, which had suffered under repeated epidemics of the disease in the previous century. As the role of mosquitoes in spreading the disease was newly understood, the city embarked on a massive campaign to drain, screen, or oil all cisterns and standing water (breeding ground for mosquitoes) in the city and educate the public on their vital role in preventing mosquitoes. The effort was a success and the disease was stopped before reaching epidemic proportions. President Theodore Roosevelt visited the city to demonstrate the safety of New Orleans. It has had no cases of Yellow Fever since.

In 1909, the New Orleans Mint ceased coinage, with active coining equipment shipped to Philadelphia.

New Orleans was hit by major storms in the 1909 Atlantic hurricane season and again in the 1915 Atlantic hurricane season.

In 1917 the Department of the Navy ordered the Storyville District closed, over the opposition of Mayor Martin Behrman.

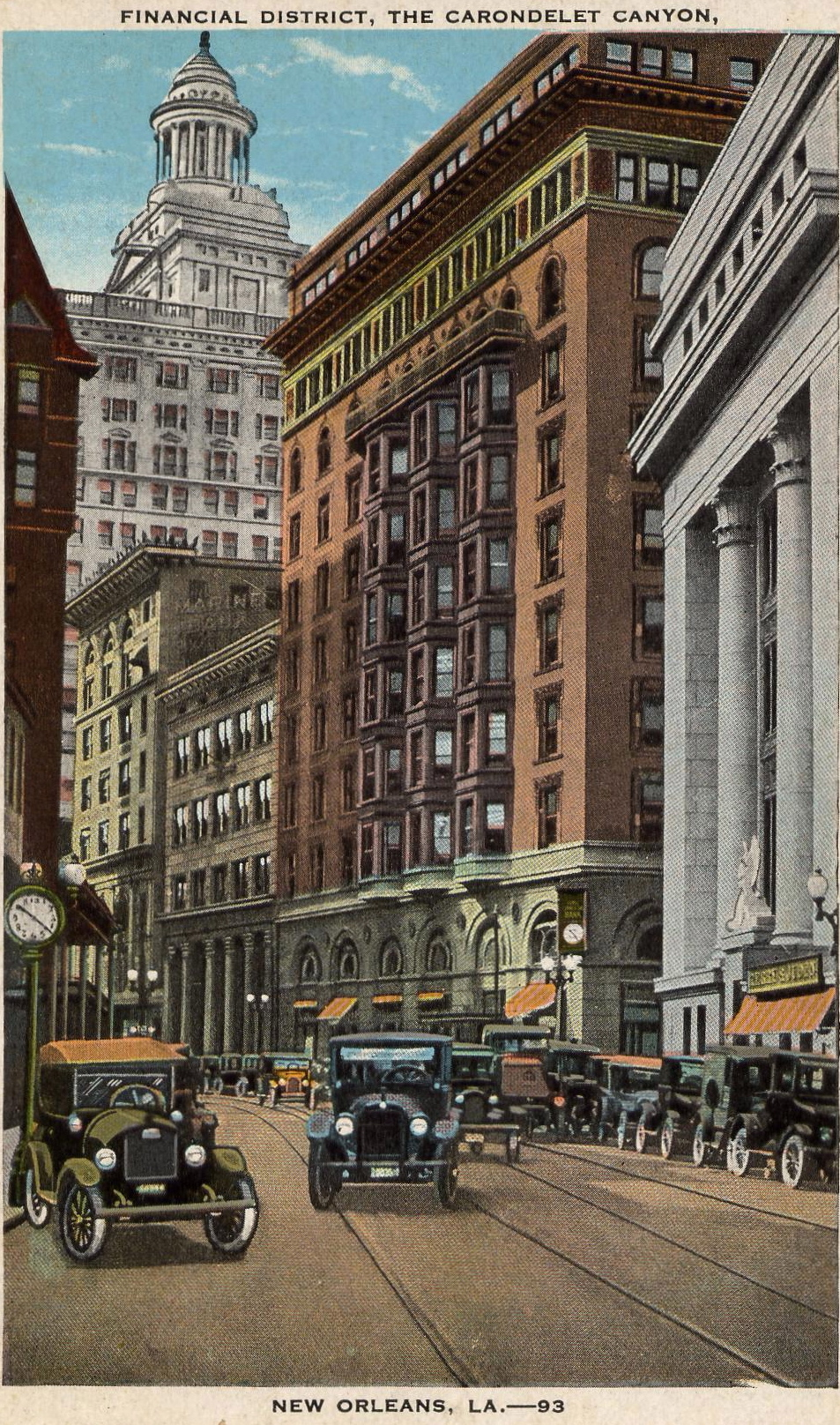
Financial district, 1920s

In 1923 the Industrial Canal opened, providing a direct shipping link between Lake Pontchartrain and the Mississippi River.

In the 1920s an effort to "modernize" the look of the city removed the old cast-iron balconies from Canal Street, the city's commercial hub. In the 1960s another "modernization" effort replaced the Canal Streetcar Line with buses. Both of these moves came to be regarded as mistakes long after the fact, and the streetcars returned to a portion of Canal Street at the end of the 1990s, and construction to restore the entire line was completed in April 2004.

The city's river levees narrowly escaped being topped in the Great Mississippi Flood of 1927.

In 1927 a project was begun to fill in the shoreline of Lake Pontchartrain and create levees along the lake side of the city. Previously areas along the lakefront like Milneburg were built up on stilts, often over water of the constantly shifting shallow shores of the Lake.

There have often been tensions between the city, with its desire to run its own affairs, and the government of the State of Louisiana wishing to control the city. Perhaps the situation was never worse than in the early 1930s between Louisiana Gov. Huey P. Long and New Orleans Mayor T. Semmes Walmsley, when armed city police and state troopers faced off at the Orleans Parish line and armed conflict was only narrowly avoided.

During World War II, New Orleans was the site of the development and construction of Higgins boats under the direction of Andrew Higgins. General Dwight D. Eisenhower proclaimed these landing craft vital to the Allied victory in the war.

The suburbs saw great growth in the second half of the 20th century, and it was only in the post-World War II period that a truly metropolitan New Orleans comprising the New Orleans center city and surrounding suburbs developed. The largest suburb today is Metairie, an unincorporated subdivision of Jefferson Parish that borders New Orleans to the west. In a somewhat different postwar developmental pattern than that experienced by other older American cities, New Orleans' center city population grew for the first two decades after the war. This was due to the city's ability to accommodate large amounts of new, suburban-style development within the existing city limits, in such neighborhoods as Lakeview, Gentilly, Algiers and New Orleans East. Unlike some other municipalities, notably many in Texas, New Orleans is unable to annex adjacent suburban development.

Mayor DeLesseps "Chep" Morrison was elected as a reform candidate in 1946. He served as mayor of New Orleans until 1961, shaping the city's post-World War II trajectory. His energetic administration accomplished much and received considerable national acclaim. By the end of his mayoralty, however, his political fortunes were dwindling, and he failed to effectively respond to the growing Civil Rights Movement.

The 1947 Fort Lauderdale Hurricane hit the city in September 1947. The levees & pumping system succeeded in protecting the city proper from major flooding, but many areas of the new suburbs in Jefferson Parish were deluged, and Moisant Airport was shut down under 2 feet (0.61 m) of water.

In 1958, Fernando Rios, a Mexican tour guide in the city for work, was killed in an act of gay bashing involving several students from Tulane.

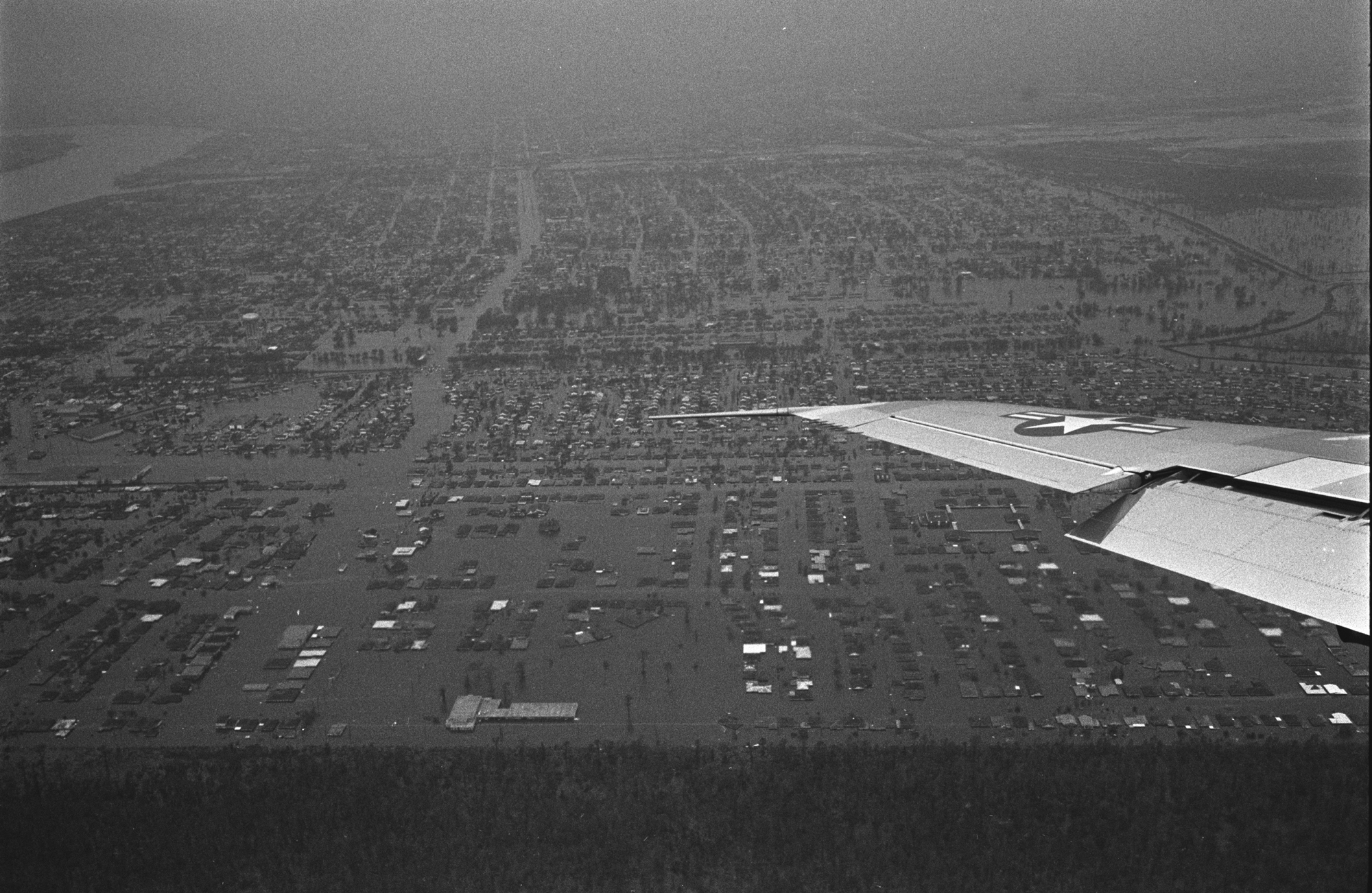
View of flooding after Hurricane Betsy as viewed from President Lyndon Johnson's Air Force One airplane, September 10, 1965

In January 1961 a meeting of the city's white business leaders publicly endorsed desegregation of the city's public schools. That same year Victor H. Schiro became the city's first mayor of Italian-American ancestry.

In 1965 the Mississippi River-Gulf Outlet Canal ("MR GO", pronounced mister go) was completed, connecting the Intracoastal Waterway with the Gulf of Mexico. The Canal was expected to be an economic boom that would eventually lead to the replacement of the Mississippi Riverfront as the metro area's main commercial harbor. "MR GO" failed to live up to commercial expectations, and from its early days it was blamed for freshwater marsh-killing saltwater intrusion and coastal erosion, increasing the area's risk of hurricane storm surge.

In September 1965 the city was hit by Hurricane Betsy. Windows blew out of television station WWL while it was broadcasting. In an effort to prevent panic, mayor Vic Schiro memorably told TV and radio audiences "Don't believe any false rumors, unless you hear them from me." A breach in the Industrial Canal produced catastrophic flooding of the city's Lower 9th Ward as well as the neighboring towns of Arabi and Chalmette in St. Bernard parish. President Lyndon Johnson quickly flew to the city to promise federal aid.

In 1978, City Councilman Ernest N. Morial became the first person of African-American ancestry to be elected mayor of New Orleans.

While long one of the United States' most visited cities, tourism boomed in the last quarter of the 20th century, becoming a major force in the local economy. Areas of the French Quarter and Central Business District, which were long oriented towards local residential and business uses, increasingly catered to the tourist industry.

A century after the Cotton Centennial Exhibition, New Orleans hosted another World's Fair, the 1984 Louisiana World Exposition.

In 1986, Sidney Barthelemy was elected mayor of the Crescent City; he was re-elected in spring of 1990, serving two terms.

In 1994 and 1998, Marc Morial, the son of "Dutch" Morial, was elected to two consecutive terms as mayor.

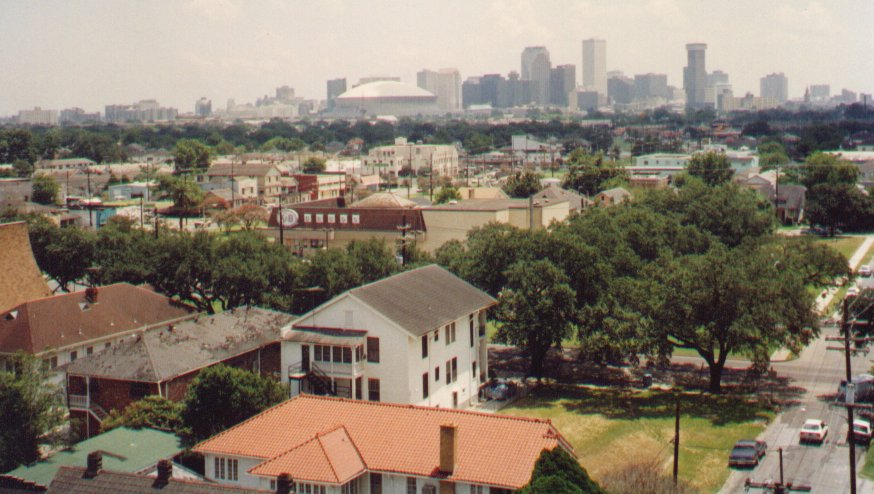
A view across Uptown New Orleans, with the Central Business District in the background, August 1991

The city experienced severe flooding in the May 8, 1995, Louisiana Flood when heavy rains suddenly dumped over a foot of water on parts of town faster than the pumps could remove the water. Water filled up the streets, especially in lower-lying parts of the city. Insurance companies declared more automobiles totaled than in any other U.S. incident up to that time. (See May 8th 1995 Louisiana Flood.)

On the afternoon of Saturday, December 14, 1996, the M/V Bright Field freightliner/bulk cargo vessel slammed into the Riverwalk mall and hotel complex on the Poydras Street Wharf along the Mississippi River. Amazingly, there were no deaths in the accident, although about 66 were injured. Fifteen shops and 456 hotel rooms were demolished. The freightliner was unable to be removed from the crash site until January 6, 1997, by which time the site had become something of a "must-see" tourist attraction.

On May 9, 1999, the Mother's Day bus crash became the deadliest bus accident in Louisiana history. An eastbound charter motorcoach carrying 43 passengers veered off Interstate 610, crashed through a perimeter chain-link fence, before colliding into a dirt embankment within City Park. The severe impact of the crash resulted in 22 fatalities and left the driver and all 21 remaining passengers injured.

== 21st century ==
In May 2002, businessman Ray Nagin was elected mayor. A former cable television executive, Nagin was unaligned with any of the city's traditional political blocks, and many voters were attracted to his pledges to fight corruption and run the city on a more business-like basis. In 2014 Nagin was convicted on charges that he had taken more than $500,000 in payouts from businessmen in exchange for millions of dollars' worth of city contracts. He received a 10-year sentence.

=== Hurricane Katrina ===
On August 29, 2005, an estimated 600,000 people were temporarily evacuated from Greater New Orleans when projected tracks of Hurricane Katrina included a possible major hit of the city. It missed, although Katrina wreaked considerable havoc on the Gulf Coast east of Louisiana.

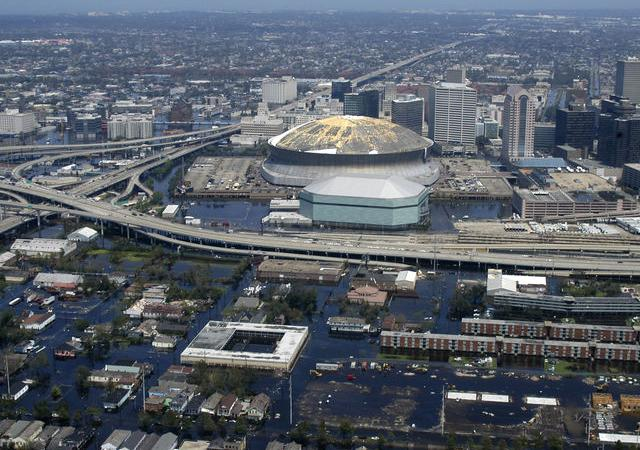
An aerial view of flooded areas of Central City and Central Business District, with the New Orleans Arena and the damaged Louisiana Superdome at center.

The city suffered from the effects of a major hurricane on and after August 29, 2005, as Hurricane Katrina made landfall in the gulf coast near the city. In the aftermath of the storm, what has been called "the largest civil engineering disaster in the history of the United States" flooded the majority of the city when the levee and floodwall system protecting New Orleans failed.

On August 26, tracks which had previously indicated the hurricane was heading towards the Florida Panhandle shifted 150 miles (240 km) westward, initially centering on Gulfport/Biloxi, Mississippi and later shifted further westward to the Mississippi/Louisiana state line. The city became aware that a major hurricane hit was possible and issued voluntary evacuations on Saturday, August 27. Interstate 10 in New Orleans East and Jefferson and St. Charles parishes was converted to all-outbound lanes heading out of the city as well as Interstates 55 and 59 in the surrounding area, a maneuver known as "contraflow."

In the Gulf of Mexico, Katrina continued to gain strength as it turned northwest, then north towards southeast Louisiana and southern Mississippi. On the morning of Sunday, August 28, Katrina was upgraded to a top-notched Category 5 hurricane. Around 10 am, Mayor Nagin issued a mandatory evacuation of the entire city, the first such order ever issued in the city's history. An estimated 1 million people evacuated from Greater New Orleans and nearby areas before the storm. However, some 20% of New Orleans residents were still in the city when the storm hit. This included people who refused to leave home, those who felt their homes were adequate shelter from the storm, and people without cars or without financial means to leave. Some took refuge in the Superdome, which was designated as a "shelter of last resort" for those who could not leave.

The eye of the storm missed the heart of the city by only 20–30 miles, and strong winds ravaged the city, shattering windows, spreading debris in many areas, and bringing heavy rains and flooding to many areas of the city.

The situation worsened when levees on four of the city's canals were breached. Storm surge was funneled in via the Mississippi River Gulf Outlet, which breached in multiple places. This surge also filled the Industrial Canal which breached either from the surge or the effects of being hit by a loose barge (the ING 4727). The London Avenue Canal and the 17th Street Canal were breached by the elevated waters of Lake Pontchartrain. Some areas that initially seemed to suffer little from the storm found themselves flooded by rapidly rising water on August 30. As much as 80% of the city—parts of which are below sea level and much of which is only a few feet above—was flooded, with water reaching a depth of 25 feet (7.6 m) in some areas. Water levels were similar to those of the 1909 hurricane; but since many areas that were swamp or farmland in 1909 had become heavily settled, the effects were massively worse. The most recent estimates of the damage from the storm, by several insurance companies, are $10 to 25 billion, while the total economic loss from the disaster has been estimated at $100 billion. Hurricane Katrina surpassed Hurricane Andrew as the costliest hurricane in United States history.

The final death toll of Hurricane Katrina was 1,836 lives lost, primarily from Louisiana (1,577). Half of these were senior citizens.

On September 22, already devastated by Hurricane Katrina, the Industrial Canal in New Orleans was again flooded by Hurricane Rita as the recently-and-hurriedly-repaired levees were breached once more. Residents of Cameron Parish, Calcasieu Parish, and parts of Jefferson Davis Parish, Acadia Parish, Iberia Parish, Beauregard Parish, and Vermillion Parish were told to evacuate ahead of the storm. Cameron Parish was hit the hardest with the towns of Creole, Cameron, Grand Chenier, Johnson Bayou, and Holly Beach being totally demolished. Records around the Hackberry area show that wind gusts reached over 180 mph at a boat tied up to a dock. The people were told to be evacuated by Thursday, September 22, 2005, by 6:00 pm. Two days later, parish officials returned to the Gibbstown Bridge that crosses the Intracoastal Canal into Lower Cameron Parish. No one was known to be left in the parish as of that time on Thursday, September 22, 2005.

It only became clear with investigations in the months after Katrina that flooding in the majority of the city was not directly due to the storm being more powerful than the city's defenses. Rather, it was caused by what investigators termed "the costliest engineering mistake in American history". The United States Army Corps of Engineers designed the levee and floodwall system incorrectly, and contractors failed to build the system in places to the requirements of the Corps of Engineers' contracts. The Orleans Levee Board made only minimal perfunctory efforts in their assigned task of inspecting the city's vital defenses. Legal investigations of criminal negligence are pending.

=== Since 2005 ===
While many residents and businesses returned to the task of rebuilding the city, the effects of the hurricane on the economy and demographics of the city are expected to be dramatic and long term. As of March 2006, more than half of New Orleanians had yet to return to the city, and there were doubts as to how many more would. By 2008, estimated repopulation had topped 330,000.

The New Orleans Saints won Super Bowl XLIV in the 2009 NFL season, bringing hope and joy to the city still recovering from Hurricane Katrina.

In 2010 Louisiana Lieutenant Governor Mitch Landrieu won the mayor's race over ten other candidates with some 66% of the vote on the first round, with widespread support across racial, demographic, and neighborhood boundaries.

The 2017 New Orleans tornado touched down in New Orleans East and left approximately 10,000 homes without electric power. John Bel Edwards declared a state of emergency.

In 2018 LaToya Cantrell took office as Mayor of New Orleans, the first woman to do so.

On the morning of October 12, 2019, a portion of the Hard Rock Hotel building at 1031 Canal Street collapsed during construction.

On August 29, 2021, Hurricane Ida made landfall in Louisiana, passing through New Orleans on the 16th anniversary of Hurricane Katrina. A citywide power outage and significant damage was reported. The post-Katrina levee system successfully defended the city, but some suburbs without levees or where levees were still under construction flooded.

On January 1, 2025, a pickup truck was driven into a crowd on Bourbon Street during New Year’s celebrations, resulting in 14 deaths and 35 injuries. The driver, Shamsud-Din Jabbar, was killed in a subsequent shootout with police. The FBI classified the event as an act of terrorism following the discovery of a Jihadist flag and explosives in the vehicle.

== See also ==
- New Orleans#History
- Timeline of New Orleans
- Creoles of color
- History of Louisiana
- List of mayors of New Orleans
- The Historic New Orleans Collection
- Jacques Chirac's 1954 thesis was The Development of the Port of New-Orleans.
