= Sauve =

Sauve may refer to:

== People ==
- Saint Sauve (died c. 614), Bishop of Amiens
- Charlotte de Sauve (1551–1617), French noblewoman
- Chris Sauvé, Canadian animator
- Sebastian Sauve (born 1987), American model

== Places ==
- La Sauve, France
- Sauve, Gard, France
- Sauve (river), a river in France, tributary of the Aigues

== See also ==
- Sauvé (disambiguation)
