= Sauvé's Crevasse =

Sauvé's Crevasse was a Mississippi River levee failure in May 1849 that resulted in flooding much of New Orleans, Louisiana.

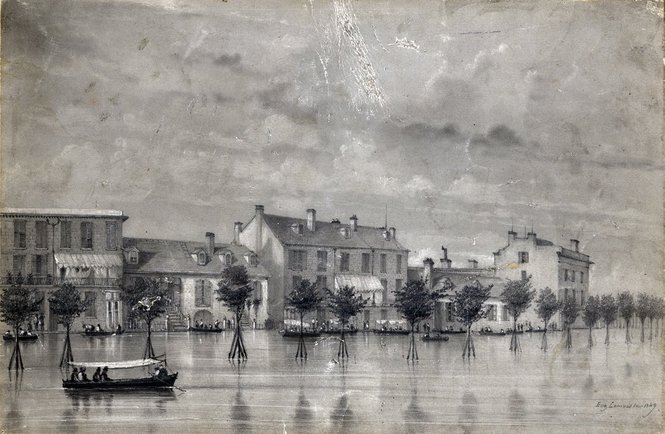
Flooding on Canal Street, New Orleans caused by the crevasse, painted in 1849 by Elizabeth Lamoisse

In May 1849 the Mississippi reached the highest water level in this area observed in twenty-one years. Some seventeen miles (27 km) up river from the city of New Orleans in Jefferson Parish lay a plantation belonging to Pierre Sauvé, in what is now River Ridge, Louisiana. There, on the afternoon of May 3, the levee gave way. At once it was seen to be impossible to stem the raging waters.

People in New Orleans hoped that the flood would find its way into Lake Pontchartrain by some channel or the other, before reaching the city. But the swamp rapidly filled; the water approached the outskirts of the town; and it was quickly too late to throw up any adequate defenses.

By May 15 the water was at Rampart Street. The First Municipality went to work on a small levee which lay along the lower bank of the Carondelet Canal, and raised it sufficiently to shut out the flood from that part of the city. Some of the water was drained via the canal into Bayou St. John and thence into Lake Pontchartrain. This protected much of the city below the Canal. This was a significant success, which kept the flooding out of the Faubourg St. John, Marigny, and other downriver portions of the city. By providing an outlet for the waters, the action prevented deeper and more widespread flooding above the Canal.

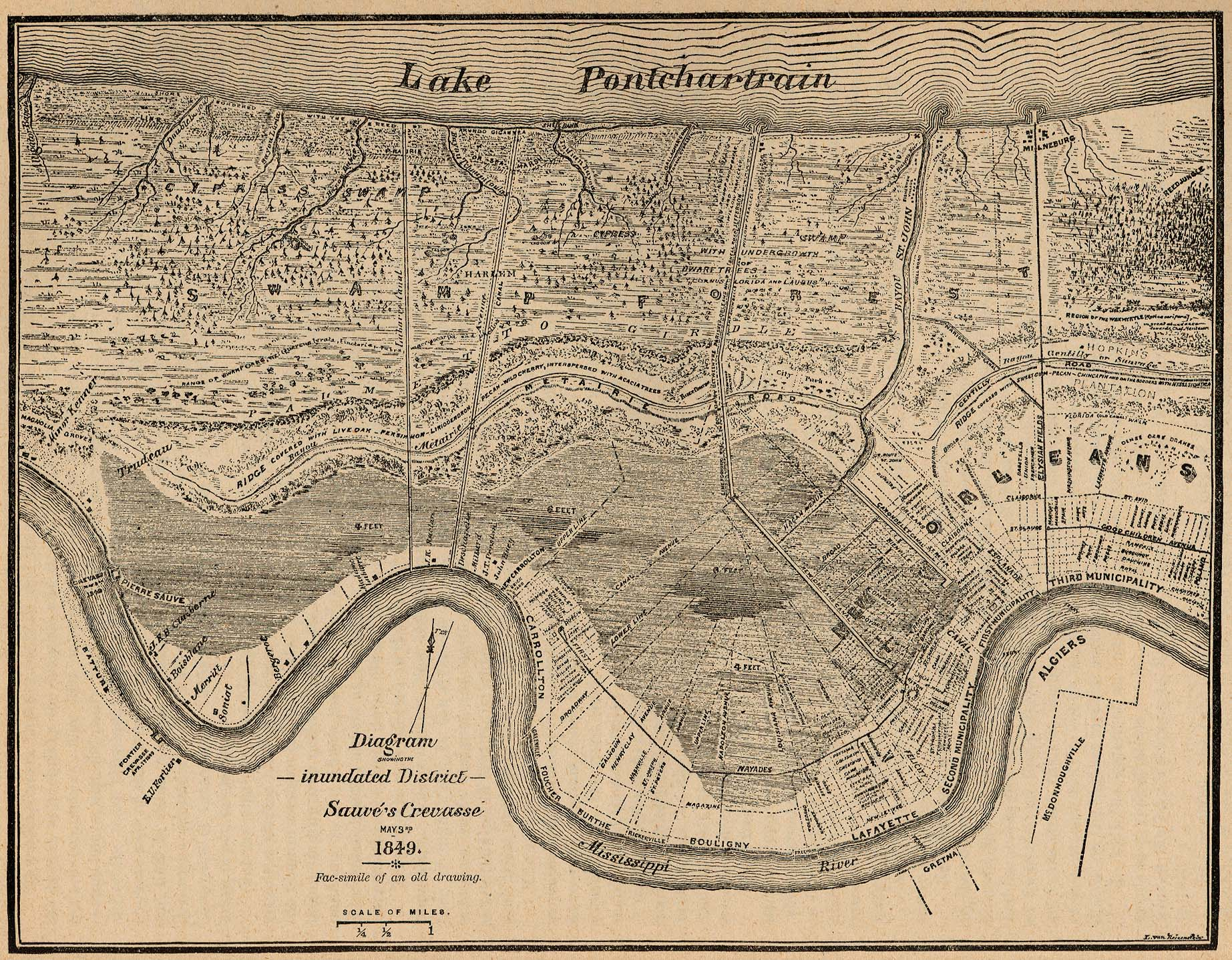
Map of the flooded area

However, most of what is now Uptown New Orleans and the New Orleans Central Business District were badly flooded. The water spread from the low-lying "back of town" into the higher ground closer to the river, and attained its highest point on May 30. In the CBD, floodwater reached Bacchus (Baronne) Street from the upper limits of Lafayette to Canal. Where the ground was low, floodwaters extended into Carondelet. Further Uptown, between Louisiana and Napoleon avenues, the flooding stopped just short of Magazine Street. In Carrollton, above Canal Avenue (Carrollton Avenue), the waters reached to Forth Street (Oak), and below to Burthe.

Waring & Cable (Social Statistics of Cities, Reports on New Orleans) reported, "About 220 inhabited squares were flooded, more than 2,000 tenements were surrounded by water, and a population of near 12,000 souls either driven from their homes or living an aquatic life of much privation and suffering." This figure may be only for the city of New Orleans as then constituted, with its upper limit at Felicity Street. Much of what later became known as Uptown New Orleans was then the separate towns of Lafayette, Bouligny, Jefferson, and Carrollton.

For weeks, the efforts to close the crevasse had proven unavailing. Then two engineers, George T. Dunbar and Surgi, undertook the task, and with carte blanche as to methods and materials, succeeded after seventeen days in stanching the flood on June 20, 1849.

The waters did not disappear until nearly a month later. By June 22, the principal streets were clear again. Heavy rains washed away the mud deposited by the flood, and the city began to resume its normal aspect. Public property had suffered extensive damage, particularly in the Second Municipality (what is now the CBD and Lower Garden District). The city and homeowners had to replace pavements, gutters and gutter-bridges. In 1850 the Second Municipality found it necessary to levy a special tax of $400,000 to offset "actual expenditures on streets, wharves and crevasses." Somewhat tardily, the municipal council erected a levee on Felicity Street, from the point where the Claiborne Canal intersected the New Basin Canal, to the corner of Apollo (Carondelet) Street.

While New Orleans has suffered numerous floods large and small in its history, the flood of 1849 was of a more disastrous scale than any save the flooding after Hurricane Katrina in 2005 (see Effect of Hurricane Katrina on New Orleans). Katrina flooded a larger total urban area, but much of what would later become the city of New Orleans and its suburbs in Jefferson Parish was still swampland in May 1849.

The water level of the Mississippi River which flooded the city in 1849 was higher than that of Lake Pontchartrain, which flowed into the city after Hurricane Katrina in 2005. This is particularly evident in areas of Uptown. Higher water levels were recorded in certain places in 1849 than when they were flooded again in 2005. (see maps of flooded area) Also, the flooding of 1849 extended into a significant part of Uptown that remained dry during the flooding after Hurricane Katrina. (see maps of flooded area) New Orleans has not experienced flooding directly from the Mississippi River since Sauvé's Crevasse, although it came dangerously close during the Great Mississippi Flood of 1927.

== See also ==
- Drainage in New Orleans
- History of New Orleans

== Sources ==
- Much of this article was adapted from History of New Orleans by John Kendall, 1922. This work is now in the public domain from expired copyright.
