= Pierre Sauvé =

American planter and politician (1756–1822)

Sauvé in 1805

Pierre Sauvé (November 6, 1756 – c. July 1822), also known as Pedro Sauvé, was a French-born American planter and politician.

== Early life and career ==
Sauvé was born on November 6, 1756 (Note: In Old Families of Louisiana, Stanley Clisby Arthur and George Campbell Huchet de Kernion state Sauvé was born in 1749 in Dunkirk whereas his birth record states he was born on November 6, 1756 in Boulogne-sur-Mer.) in Boulogne-sur-Mer, France and baptised the next day. His father Pierre Sauvé was a commandant in the French Navy. He became an amputee after being wounded at sea for which he was awarded a sword.

After arriving in Louisiana, Sauvé became a sugar planter. He was a member of the short-lived transitional municipal council of New Orleans during the ephemeral renewal of French Louisiana and briefly served as one of two "adjoint" or deputy mayors of New Orleans alongside Jean Noël Destréhan in 1803. After it was ceded to the United States, Sauvé was appointed by President Thomas Jefferson to the territory's legislative council in 1806.

He was buried on July 8, 1822.

== Personal life ==
Sauvé married Marie Rosalie Second, who died on December 27, 1827. They had four children: Adèlema "Adèle" Sauvé, Mathilde Sauvé, Fanny Sauvé and Pierre Sauvé II. His daughter Adèle Sauvé married René Trudeau, son of Zénon Trudeau. His son Pierre Sauvé II, inherited the family plantation, which became the site of Sauvé's Crevasse, the 1849 levee breach that flooded much of the city.

== Sources ==
- Arthur, Stanley Clisby; Huchet de Kernion, George Campbell (2009) [1931]. Old Families of Louisiana. Clearfield.
- Kendall, John Smith (1922). History of New Orleans. Lewis Publishing Company.
