= Charles T. Howard =

American businessman (1832–1885)

Charles Turner Howard
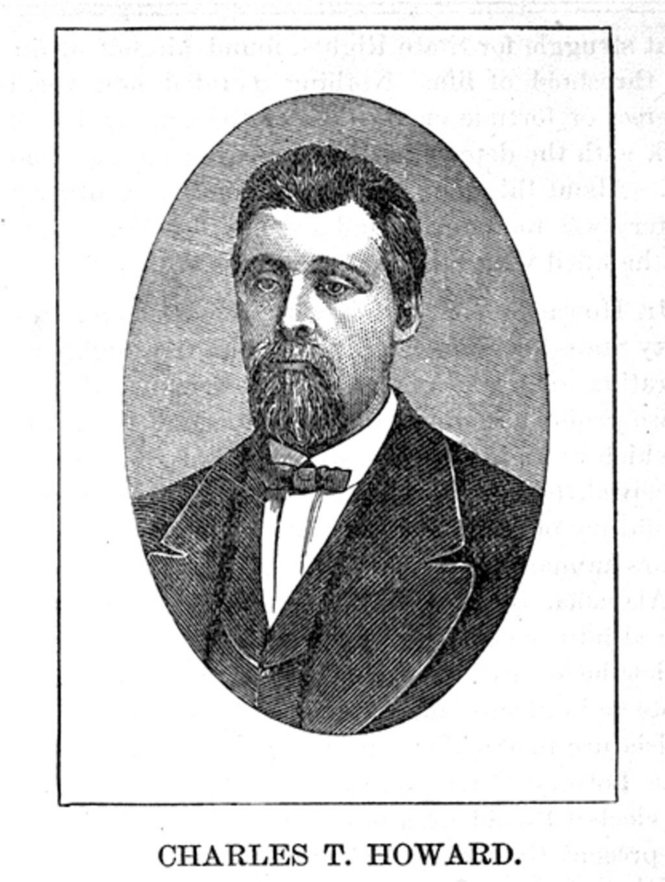
- Born: March 4, 1832; Baltimore, Maryland, U.S.
- Died: May 31, 1885 (aged 53); Dobbs Ferry, New York, U.S.
- Years active: 1868–1885
- Known for: Louisiana Lottery Company
- Spouse: Florestile Boullemet Howard
- Children: Frank Turner Howard, Harry Turner Howard, William Turner Howard, Annie Turner Howard

Charles Turner Howard (1832–1885) was an American businessman who organized the Louisiana State Lottery Company in 1869. This corporation bribed Louisiana lawmakers to enable it to stay in business, and the firm amassed a considerable fortune over the years while Howard led a controversial life. He died at age 53 after a fall from his carriage in Dobbs Ferry, New York.

Howard was born in Philadelphia, Pennsylvania as son of Elizabeth Harrison and Richard H. Turner. After 1850, he moved to New Orleans, Louisiana, changing his name from Turner to Howard in 1854, and began working as a lottery and policy dealer. When the Civil War broke out, Howard's business dealings were described as "obscure" according to a report in The New York Times. At a later point in his life, he said he had been a soldier for the confederate side for Tennessee, but this was subsequently disproven. Contemporaneous records show him listed on the rolls as a 1st Sergeant of Co. G, Crescent Regt., La. Infantry in 1861-1862. In 1866, he was hired by the Kentucky lottery firm of C. H. Murray & Company to apply for a lottery charter in Louisiana from the state legislature. This effort failed, but after two years, a second attempt succeeded, partially as a result of bribery of key lawmakers in Louisiana. Howard was given $50,000 to apply for a charter and when the legislative grant came through, he refused to turn the charter over to his employers. A member of the firm of C. H. Murray & Co. named Marcus Cicero Stanley filed suit against Howard for being refused his "just share of the profits". The suit alleged that Howard had bribed a "large number of legislators" as well as an ex-Governor of Louisiana. But the lawsuit was dropped because it was decided that, given the nature of the gambling business, that the parties had no legal standing to enforce the contract.

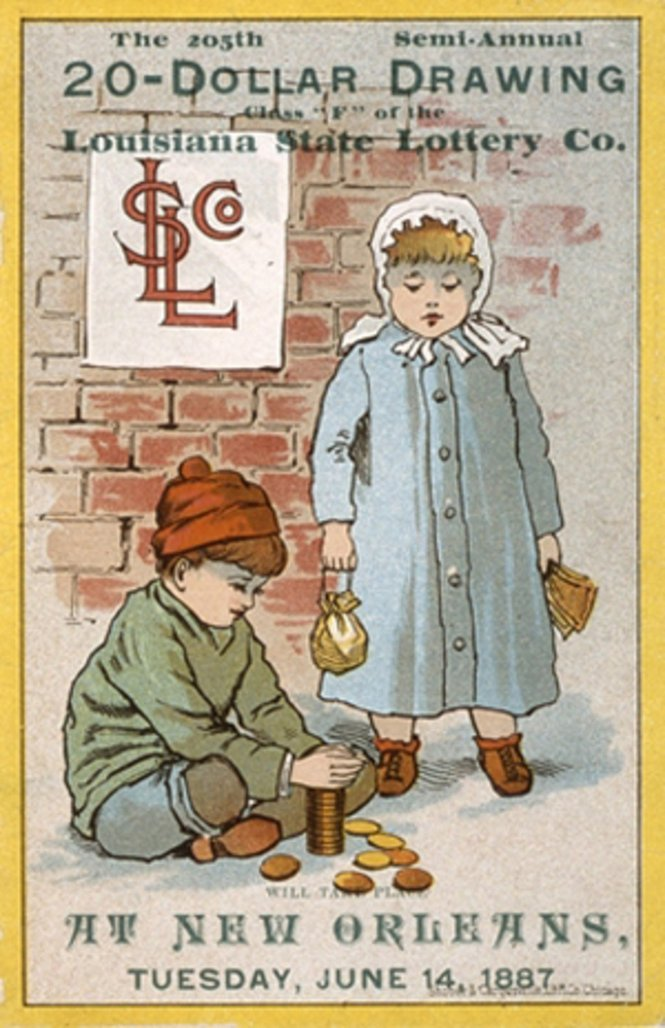
An 1887 advertisement for the Louisiana State Lottery

The Louisiana Lottery Company gave Howard and his partners profits of 50%, and business began in January 1869. Howard used monies from the lottery to help win favor with the state legislature.

In less than a year the company was enabled to put under its control the Legislature and the politics of the entire State. Its paid agents were on the floor of the Legislature not only as lobbyists, but as members of both houses. More than one Governor of the State acknowledged its sway, and the Mayor of the capital city of Baton Rouge was one of its regular agents for the sale of tickets.

— The New York Times

Howard and his partners were adept at using money and influence to keep the lottery going and profitable. At one point, a state Constitutional Convention was about to be passed which would have outlawed the lottery, but "false pretenses, bribery and coercion" were used to ensure that any new constitution did not exclude the lottery. At one point, a Louisiana judge made some "extraneous remarks" which had "no legal value" which said that the new Louisiana Constitution had "legalized" the Louisiana Lottery, and Howard made sure not to appeal this decision. During its heyday, the firm divided about $2 million annually among stockholders, including Howard, as well as pay for the numerous bribes for public officials.

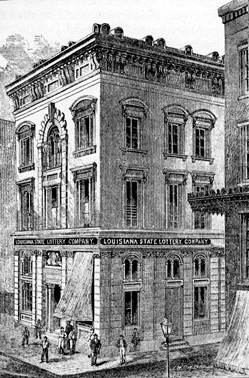
Office of the Louisiana State Lottery Company in New Orleans, circa 1870s to 1880s

Howard built a house on St. Charles Street in New Orleans with a garden described as the "finest in the city." He had a second home in Dobbs Ferry, a suburb of New York City. He acquired a reputation for giving generously to the city's charitable institutions. While he was a social climber, he did not respond kindly to snubs, and he "got even" with groups and organizations which had excluded him, such as the Metairie Jockey Club and the La Variétés Club, by waiting patiently, buying up the properties at propitious times, and casting out the snubbers.

A noted instance of the manner in which he got even with those who refused to associate with him was afforded in his treatment of the Metairie Jockey Club. He sought an entrance in the company of this association, whose race course was the most noted in the South. The club, however, refused to admit him, and he swore that he would buy out their course and turn it into a graveyard. he bided his time, and when the opportunity came he did according to his oath. The beautiful Metairie Cemetery took the place of the Metairie race course, and a new course was established by Howard in its stead.

— Report in The New York Times, 1885

Howard was involved in controversy on several occasions. When a serious fever struck New Orleans in 1878, one report suggested that Howard has not contributed any monies to a relief effort. In 1879, he was arrested in New York City for starting lottery agencies to sell shares or tickets of the Louisiana State Lottery. A detective charged that he had been selling lottery tickets which had been against the laws of New York State at the time. There was no record of Howard having spent any time in jail. He was reported to own an interest in a sugar plantation, own a "stud of horses", have financial interests in two New Orleans newspapers, and at one point aspired to the office of Governor of Louisiana.

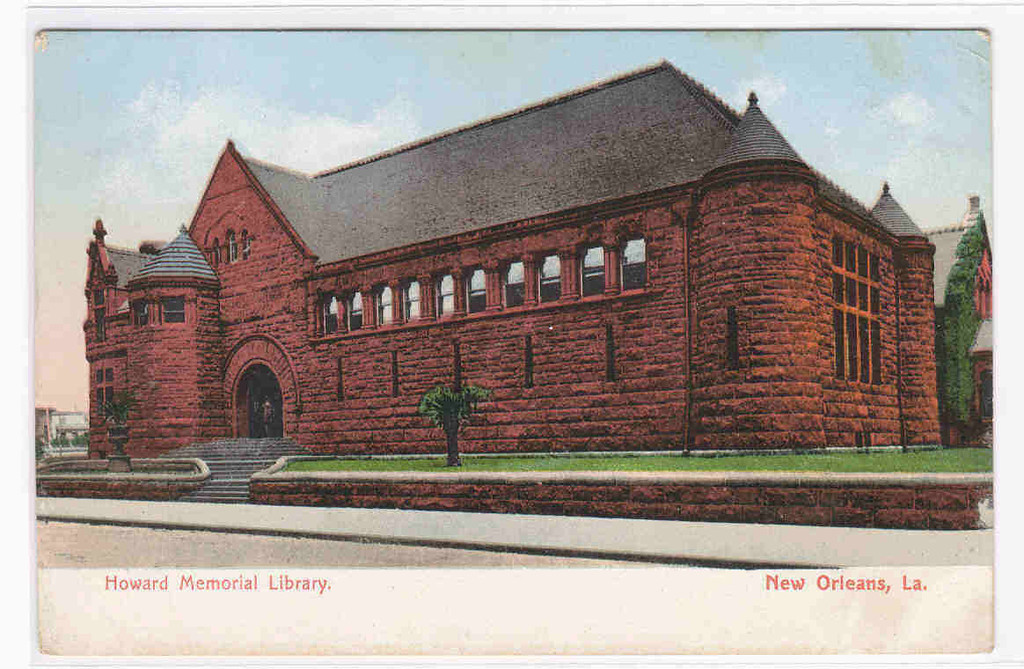
Postcard of the Howard Memorial Library in New Orleans, circa 1905

Howard died in a carriage accident in 1885 when he was thrown from the vehicle and severely injured.

== Legacy ==
Howard's son, Frank Turner Howard (1855-1911), continued in the lottery business and amassed fortunes, according to one account, with revenues of $4,000,000 a month reported, with about 60% of that being paid out in the form of prizes. Howard's daughter, Annie Howard, along with her brothers helped to build the Howard Memorial Library as well as the Louisiana Historical Annex, which has a collection of Confederate archives, including the private and state papers of southern president Jefferson Davis.

Schools in New Orleans were named for Frank T. Howard.
