= Louisiana State Lottery Company =

Private lottery (1868–1907?)

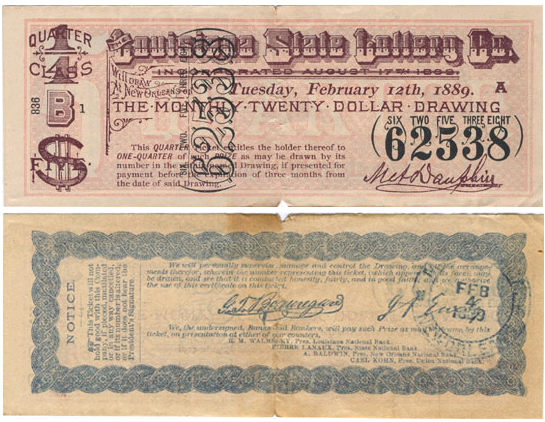
A ticket from the February 12th, 1889 Louisiana State Lottery

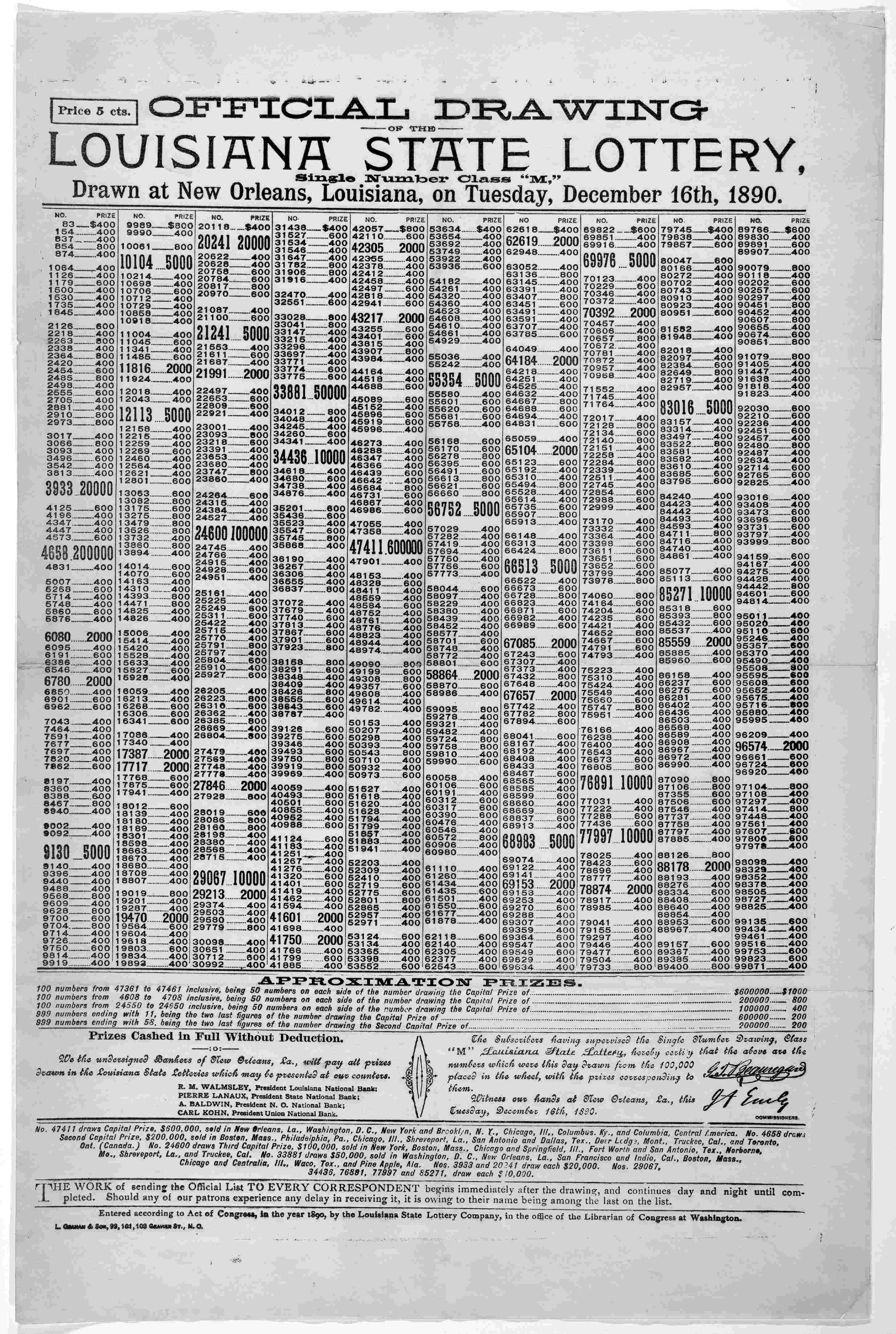
Official drawing of the Louisiana State lottery. Single number class "M." drawn at New Orleans, Louisiana, on Tuesday, December 16th, 1890.

The Louisiana State Lottery Company was a private corporation that in the mid-19th century ran the Louisiana lottery. It was for a time the only legal lottery in the United States, and for much of that time had a very foul reputation as a swindle of the state and citizens and a repository of corruption.

== Background ==
The company, initially a syndicate from New York, was chartered on August 11, 1868 by the Louisiana General Assembly with a 25-year charter and in exchange gave the State $40,000 a year. With the passage of the charter, all other organized gambling was made illegal. This start almost immediately gave it a bad reputation as having bribed the legislators into a corrupt deal, especially at a time when other states were viewing lotteries and gambling with suspicion. It was founded by John A. Morris and Charles T. Howard, the former owning a controlling interest and the latter serving as its nominal head.

Charles Howard served as the first president, having previously worked for the Alabama Lottery and Kentucky State Lottery. Former Confederate generals P.G.T. Beauregard and Jubal Anderson Early held the drawings. They added credibility but according to The New York Times they were paid handsomely for the few days each month their services were needed. Most of the tickets were sent via special train (there was so much mail it required a special consideration) to agents in the U.S. and abroad who would sell them in their respective areas.

In 1890, three years before the charter's expiration, the company bribed the legislature into passing an act to write them into the Louisiana's constitution (thus requiring a successful supermajority of both houses of the Louisiana State Legislature and referendum) by offering to give the state $500,000 per year.

== Opposition and downfall ==
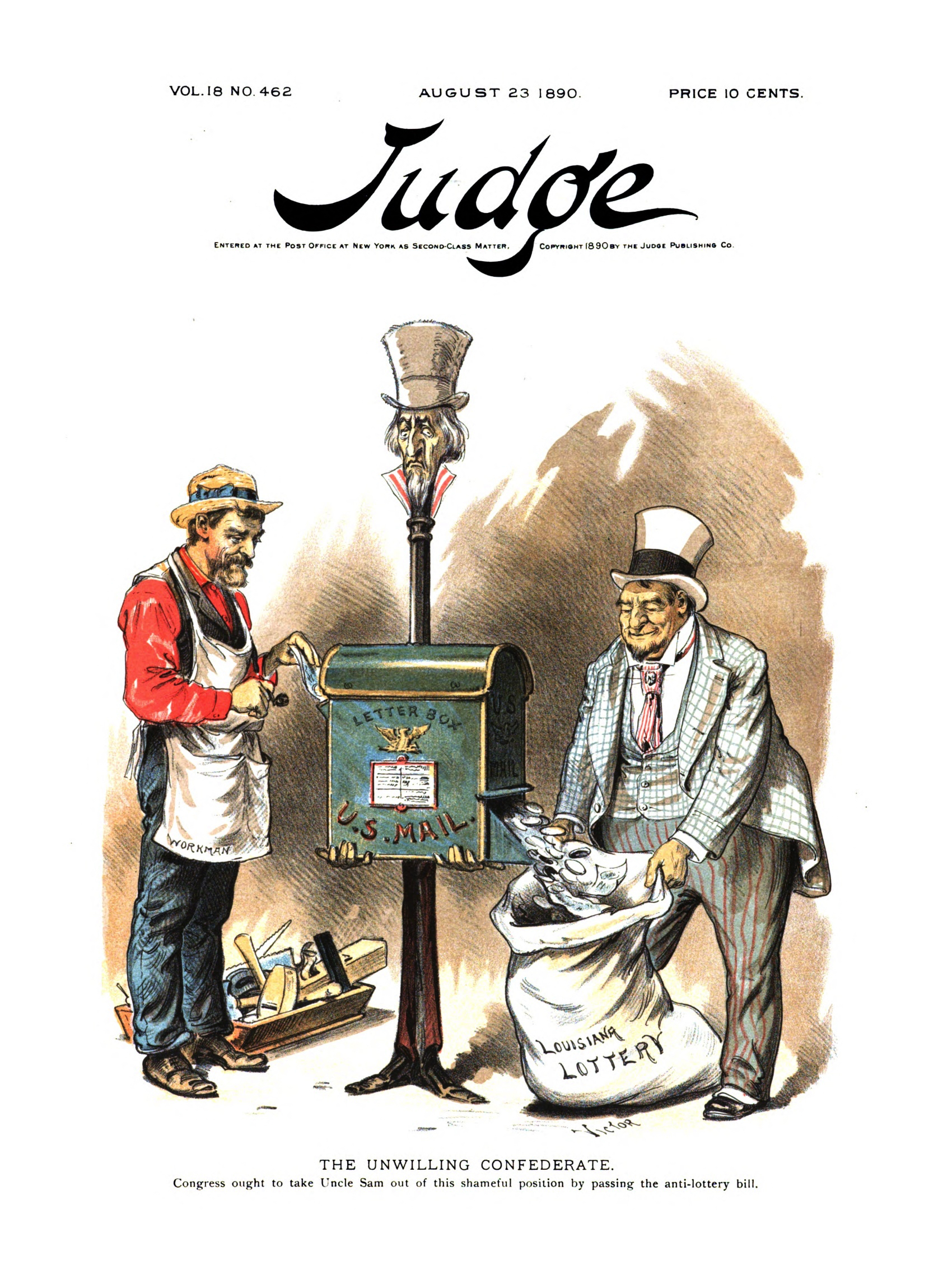
Anti-lottery cartoon depicting the Company's usage of the U.S. Postal Service prior to the banning of interstate lottery ticket sales by Congress. (Judge, 23 Aug 1890)

While the lottery was always opposed on vice and morality grounds, the renewal of the charter and constitutional amendment began the serious, organized opposition that would kill the company. The Anti-Lottery League and its newspaper, the "New Delta" were the main proponents of ending the drawings. The League was backed by many prominent activists of the time, such as Anthony Comstock, and by Edward Douglass White, who argued against it in the Louisiana Supreme Court. The prominent Presbyterian minister of First Presbyterian Church, Benjamin M. Palmer, delivered an anti-lottery speech on June 25, 1891 at one of the League's largest meetings at the Grand Opera House in New Orleans. Many believed this was the final blow to the lottery.

The Louisiana State Lottery became the most notorious state lottery and was known as the "Golden Octopus" as it reached into every American home using the U.S. Postal Service. In 1890 the United States Congress banned the interstate transportation of lottery tickets and lottery advertisements, which composed 90% of the company's revenue. The Supreme Court of the United States upheld this statute in 1892.

In March of that year the constitutional amendment to renew the charter (which had passed the legislature, but needed voter approval) was defeated. Murphy J. Foster, an anti-lottery gubernatorial candidate, was elected, as were a majority of anti-lottery legislators. During that year all lottery operations were banned, and the charter expired in December 1893.

Backed by John A. Morris, it then moved its de jure headquarters to Honduras and illegally issued lottery tickets in the United States. In 1907 its Delaware printing press was found out by federals and shut down.

== See also ==
- Charles T. Howard, 1832–1885, first president of the Louisiana State Lottery Co.
