= List of submerged places in Spain =

This is a list of submerged places in Spain. This list includes settlements which are submerged under the waters of a reservoir. When the water level is low, the structures are visible.

== Submerged villages and municipalities ==
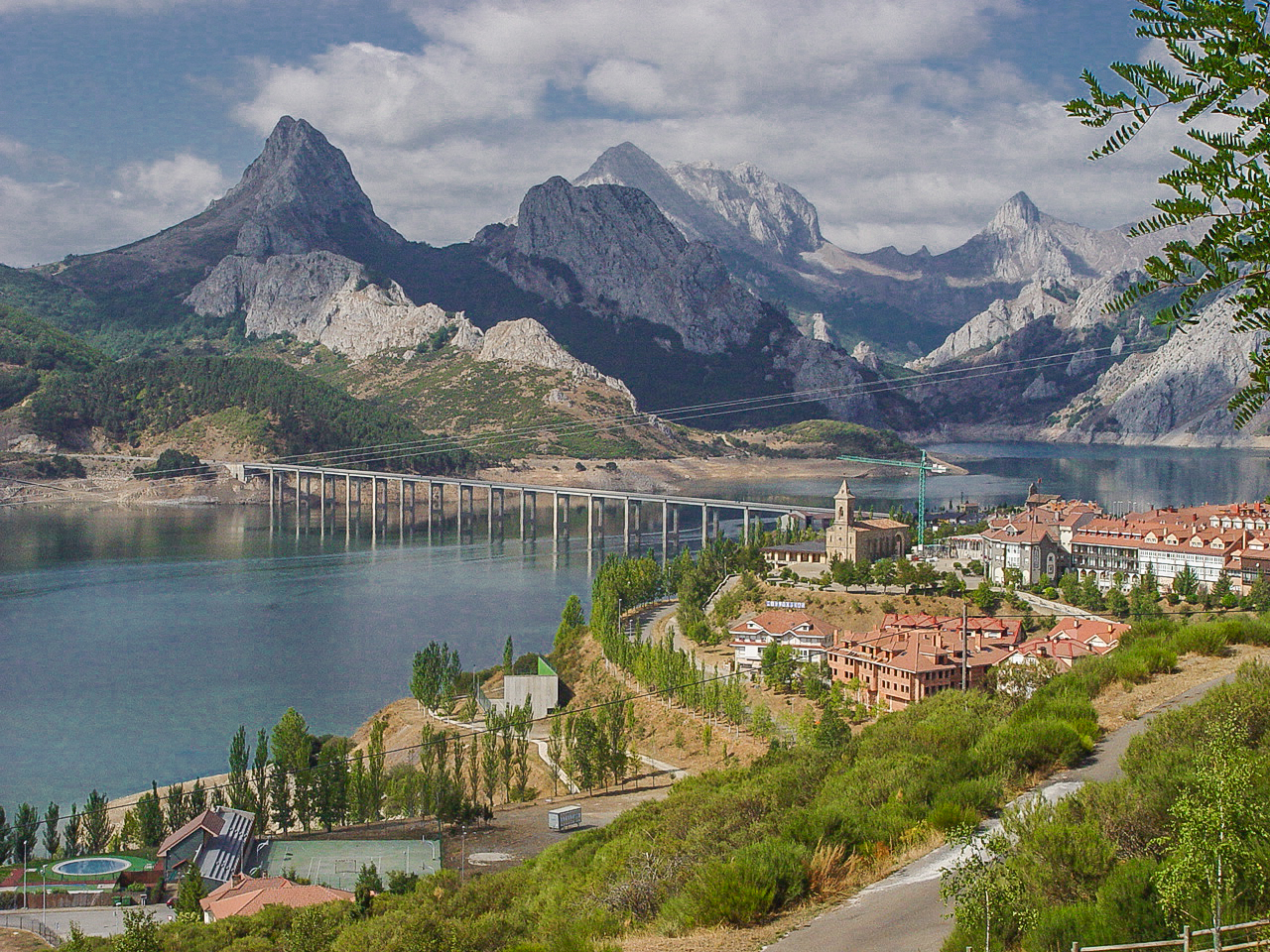
New Riaño, the new village built after the flooding of Riaño, in the province of León, Spain. The old village is located under the bridge. The mountain on the left is Peak Gilbo.

Villages and municipalities under the waters of a reservoir. Sometimes, a new village or municipality is created with the same name in another location:

- Old village of Benagéber in Embalse de Benagéber, Valencian Community
- Old town of Mequinenza in Embalse de Ribarroja, Zaragoza
- Old village of Fayón in Embalse de Ribarroja, Zaragoza
- La Muedra in Embalse de La Cuerda del Pozo, Soria
- Old village of Mansilla de la Sierra in Embalse de Mansilla de la Sierra, La Rioja
- Mediano in Embalse de Mediano, Province of Huesca
- Anciles, Burón (partially), Éscaro, La Puerta, Old village of Riaño and Pedrosa del Rey in Embalse de Riaño, province of León
- Sant Romà de Sau in Embalse de Sau, Catalonia
- Santa María de Poyos in Embalse de Buendía, province of Guadalajara
- Santolea in Embalse de Santolea, province of Teruel
- Old village of Portomarín, in Embalse de Belesar, province of Lugo
- Old village of Castellar de la Frontera, in province of Cadiz
- El Atance in Embalse de El Atance, province of Guadalajara
- Argusino in Embalse de Almendra, province of Zamora.
- Old village of Tiurana in Embalse de Rialb, province of Lleida.
- Old village of Lanuza in Embalse de Lanuza, province of Huesca.
- Talavera la Vieja in Embalse de Valdecañas, province of Cáceres.
- Old village of Canales in Embalse de Canales, province of Granada.
- Peñarrubia in Embalse de Guadalteba, province of Málaga.
- Gascas de Alarcón in the Alarcón Reservoir, province of Cuenca.

=== Gallery ===
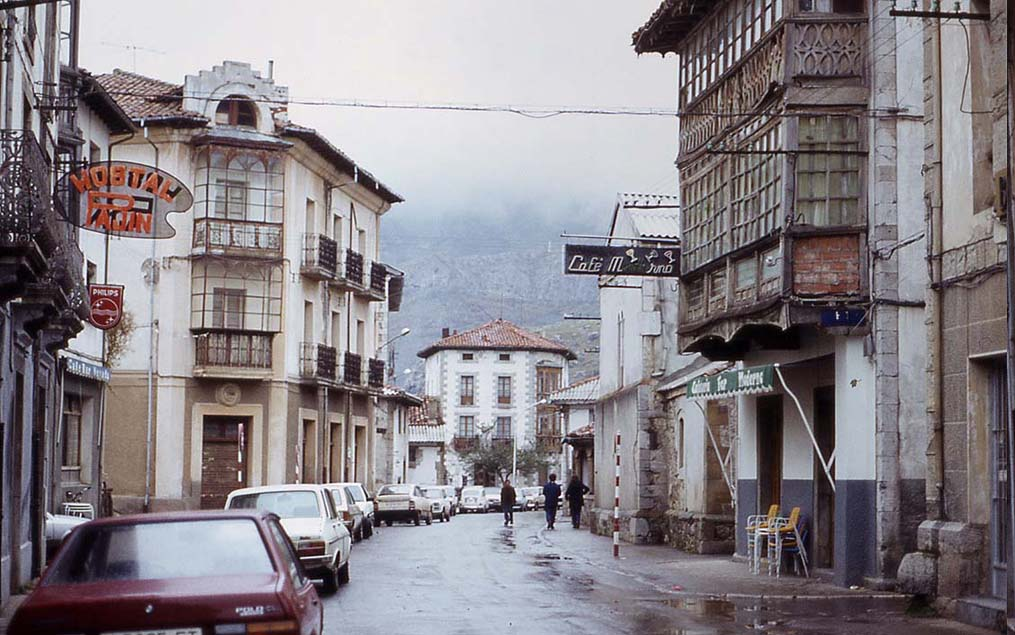
Old village of Riaño in November 1984, three years before being submerged

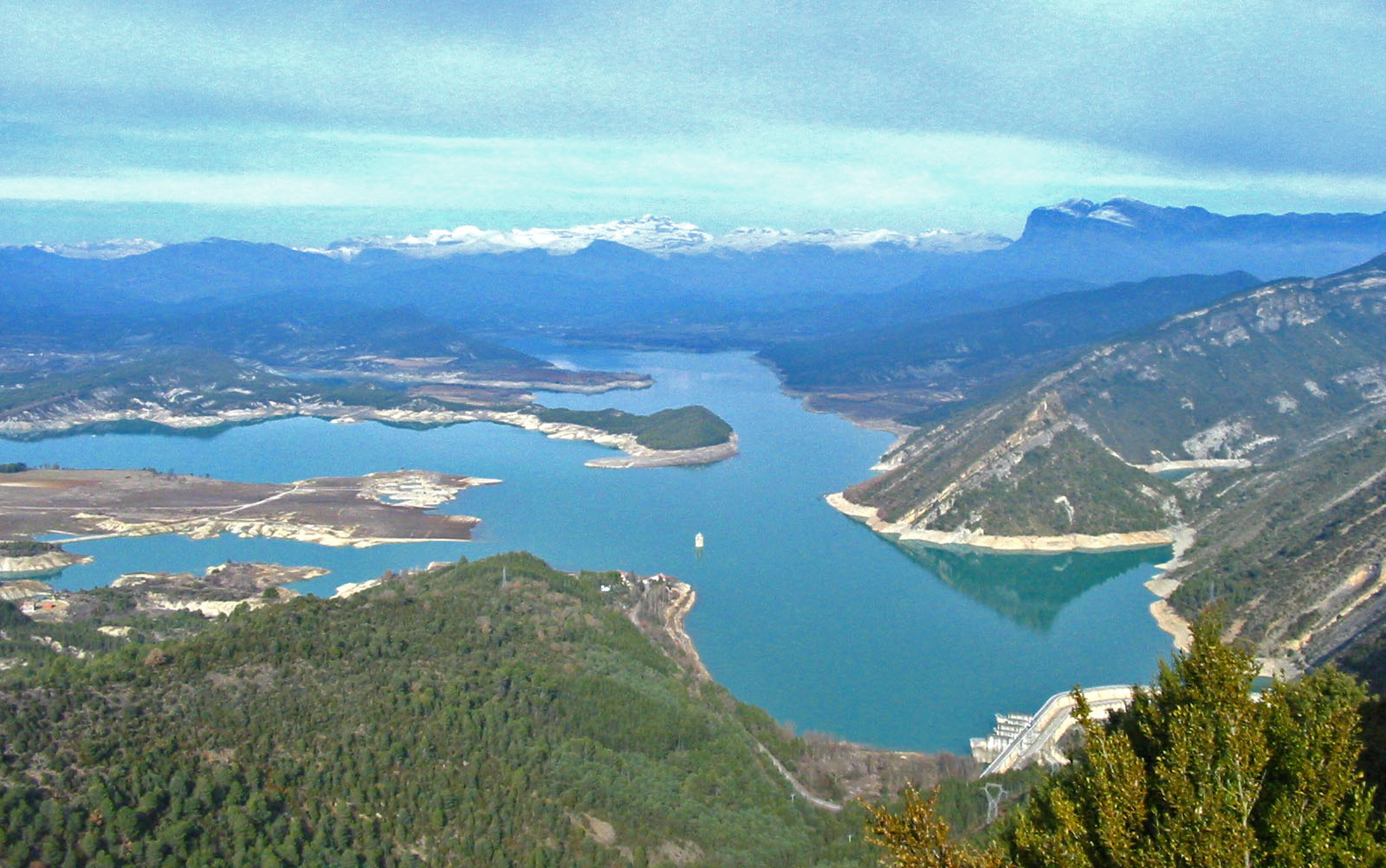
Embalse de Mediano, the tower of the Church of Mediano is visible

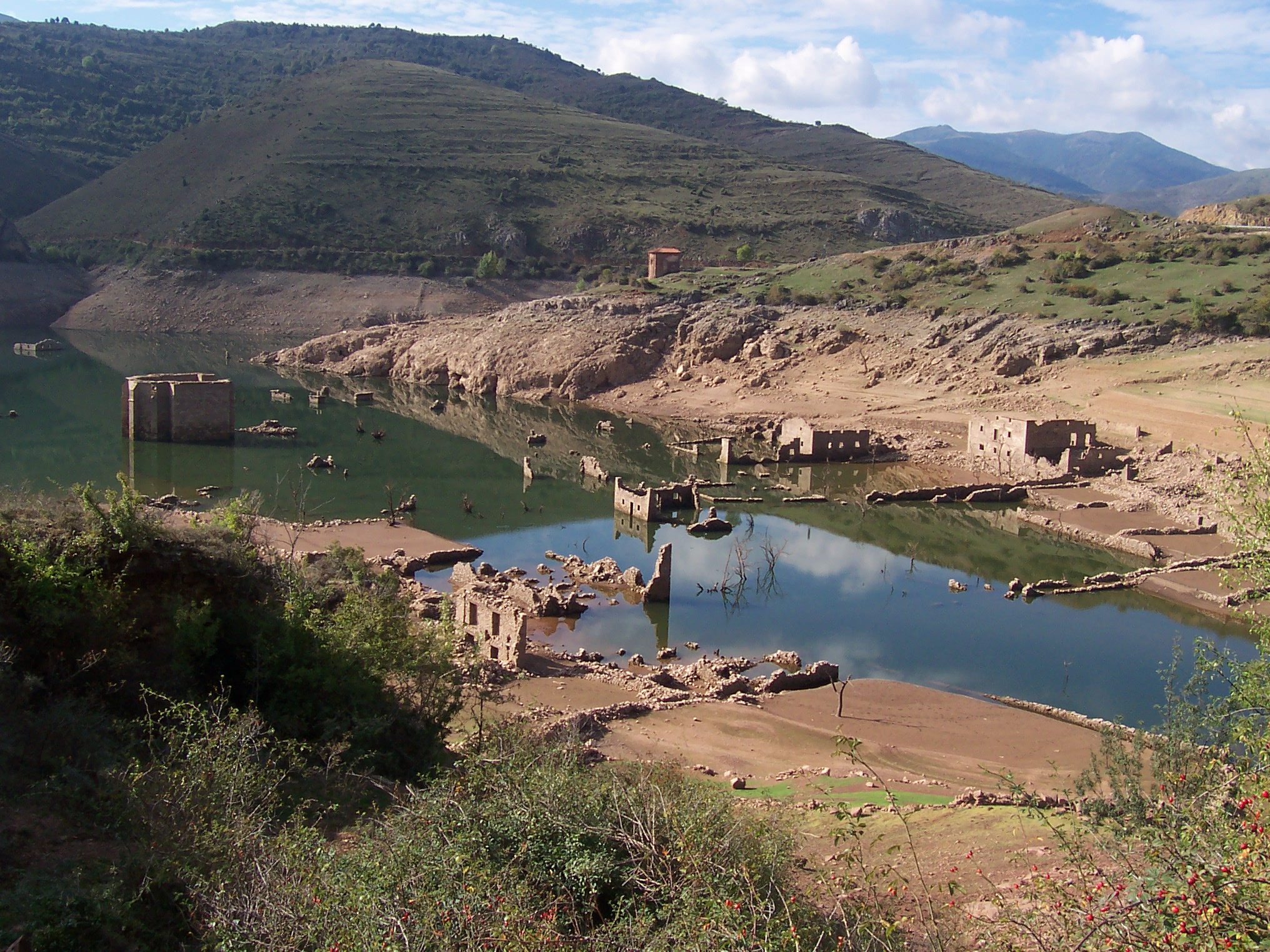
Old village of Mansilla de la Sierra ruins

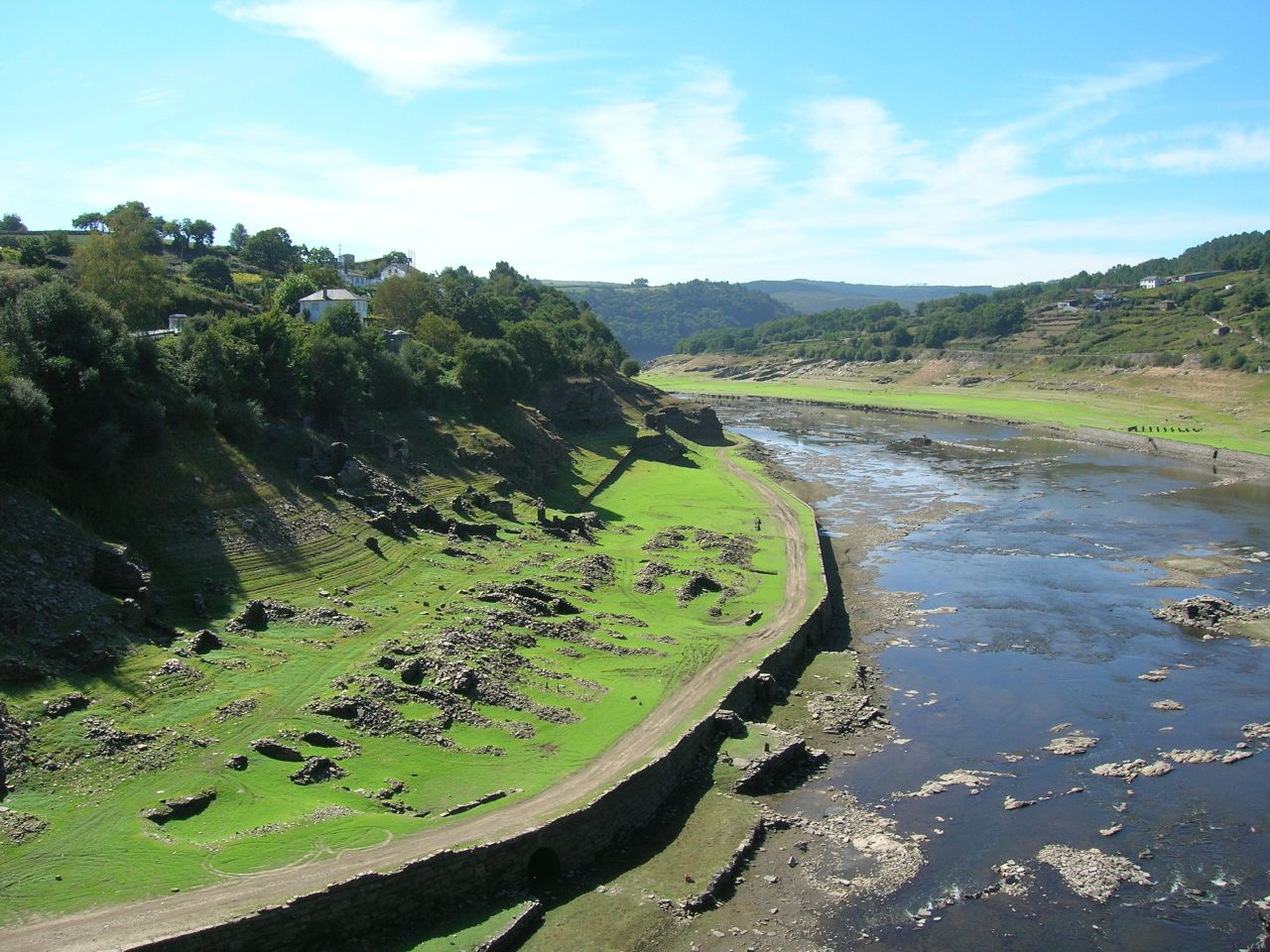
Old village of Portomarín ruins

== Submerged landmarks ==
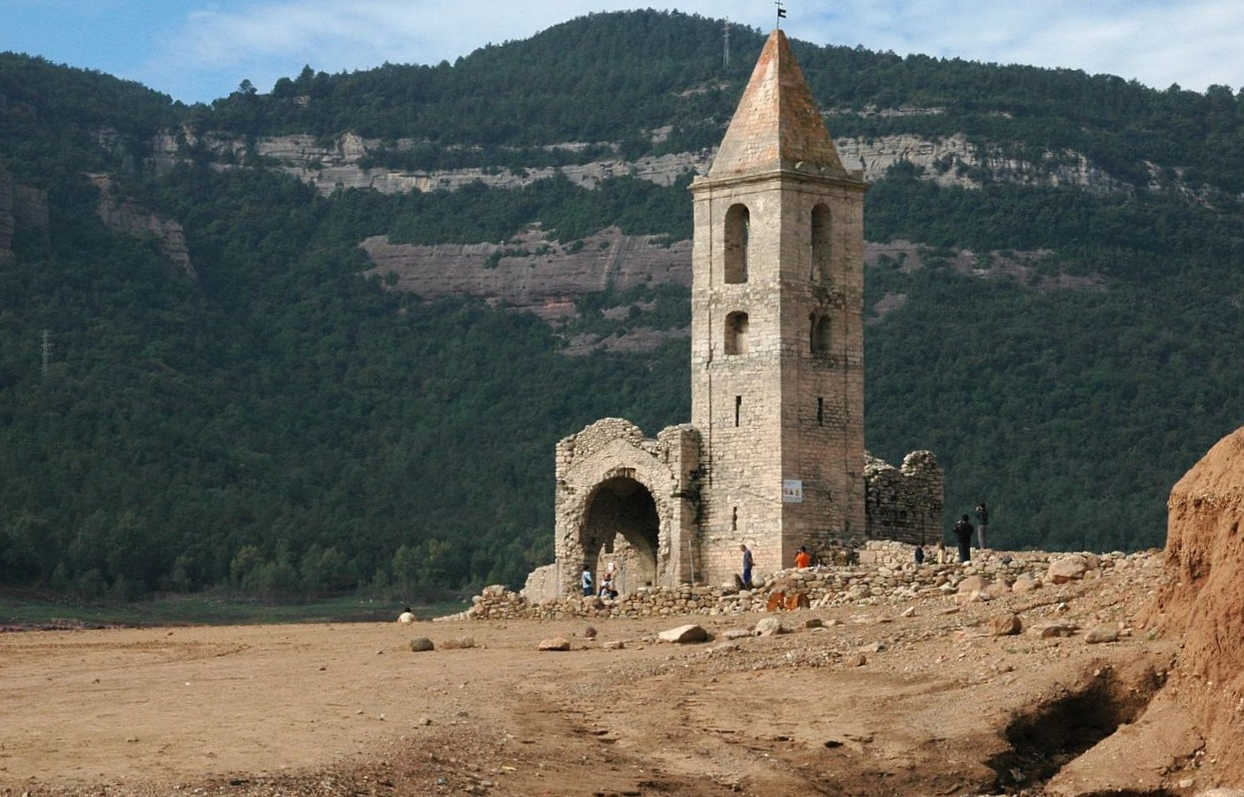
Church of Sant Romà

Landmarks which are partially or completely under the waters of a reservoir. Some of them may be visible under some circumstances:

- Church of Mediano in Embalse de Mediano, Province of Huesca
- Church of Sant Romà in Pantà de Sau, Province of Barcelona, Catalonia
- Hermitage of El Mibral in Embalse de Guadalcacín, province of Cádiz
- Hermitage of San Antonio in Embalse de Mediano, Province of Huesca
- Hermitage of Virgen de Monclús in Embalse de Mediano, Province of Huesca
- A medieval bridge in Embalse de Mediano, Province of Huesca
- Reales Baños de La Isabela in Embalse de Buendía, Province of Guadalajara
- Castro Candaz, province of Lugo

=== Gallery ===
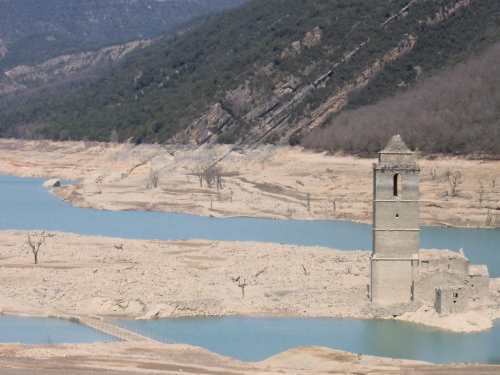
Church of Mediano, Huesca

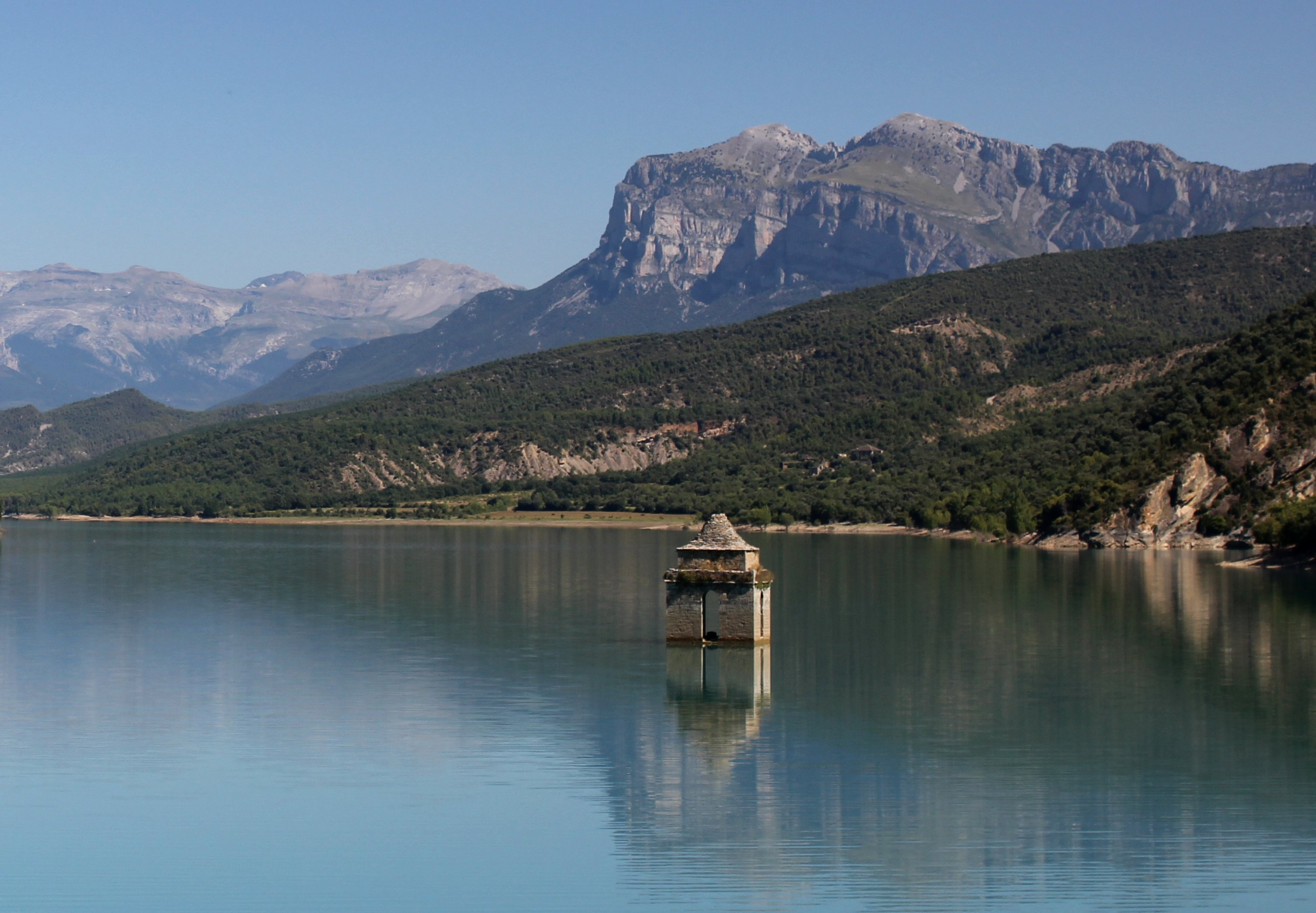
Tower of the Church of Mediano, Huesca

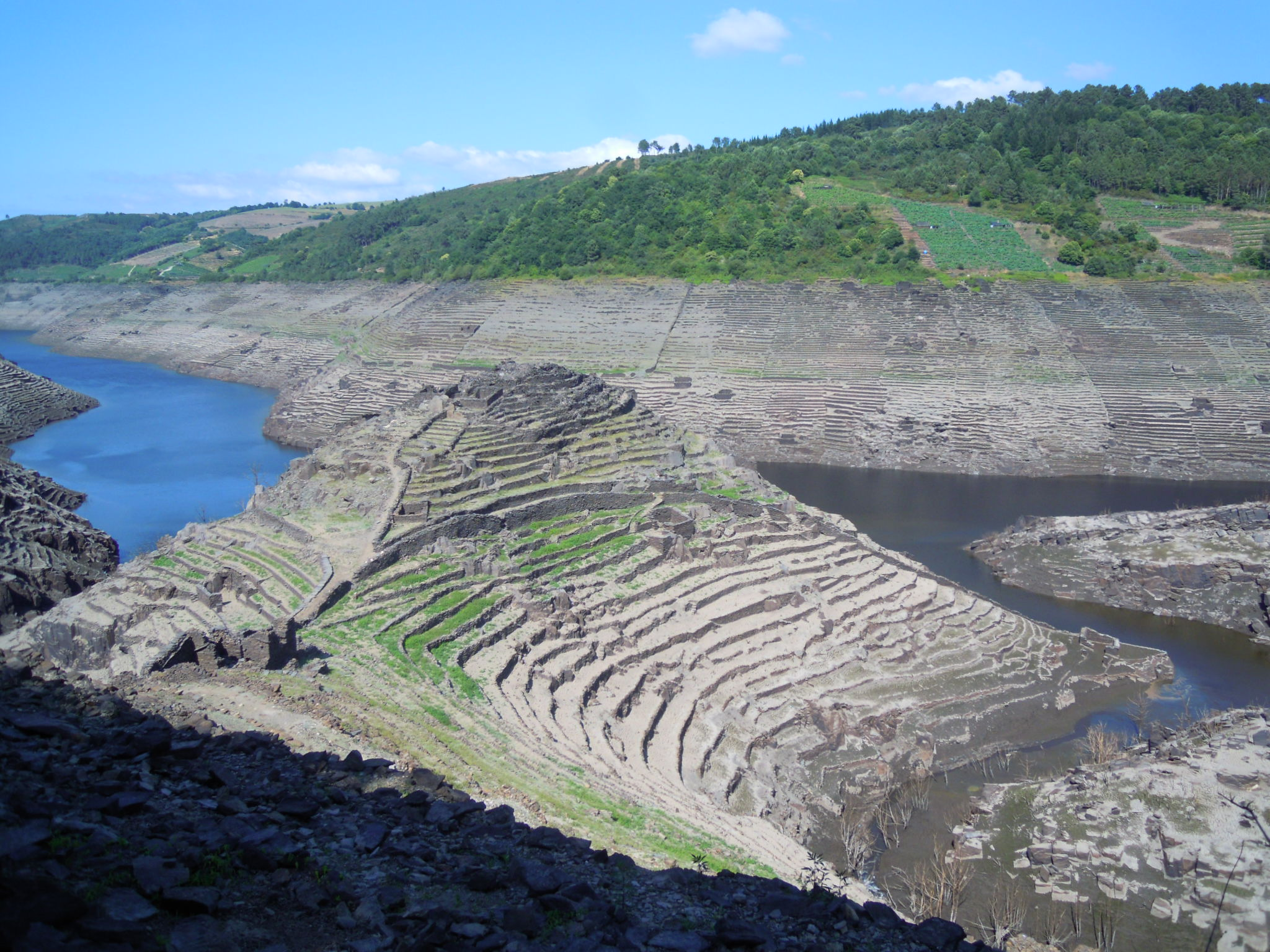
Castro Candaz, province of Lugo

== Moved landmarks ==
Some landmarks have been moved partially or completely to other locations and saved from being submerged:

- The Church of Pedrosa del Rey was moved from Pedrosa del Rey to New Riaño.
- The Church of Nuestra Señora del Rosario was moved from La Puerta to New Riaño.
- The Church of San Nicolás was moved from the old Portomarín to the new one.
- The Church of San Pedro was moved from the old Portomarín to the new one.
- The Church of Nuestra Señora de la Asunción was moved from El Atance to Guadalajara and renamed to Church of San Diego de Alcalá.
- A fountain from El Atance was moved to a park in Sigüenza.
- The facade of the Church of San Pedro was moved from the old village of Tiurana to the new one.

=== Gallery ===
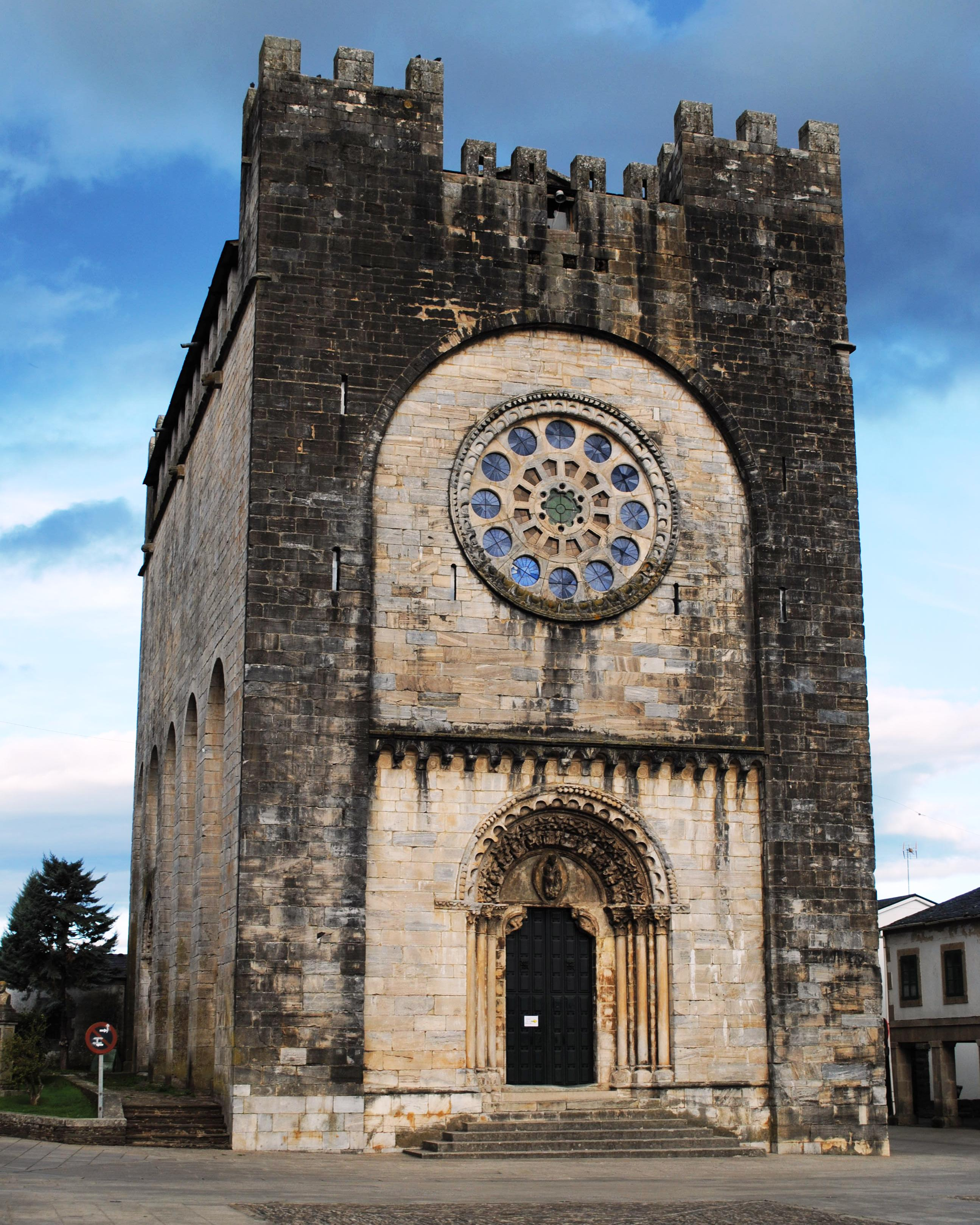
Church of San Xoán, Portomarín moved brick-by-brick

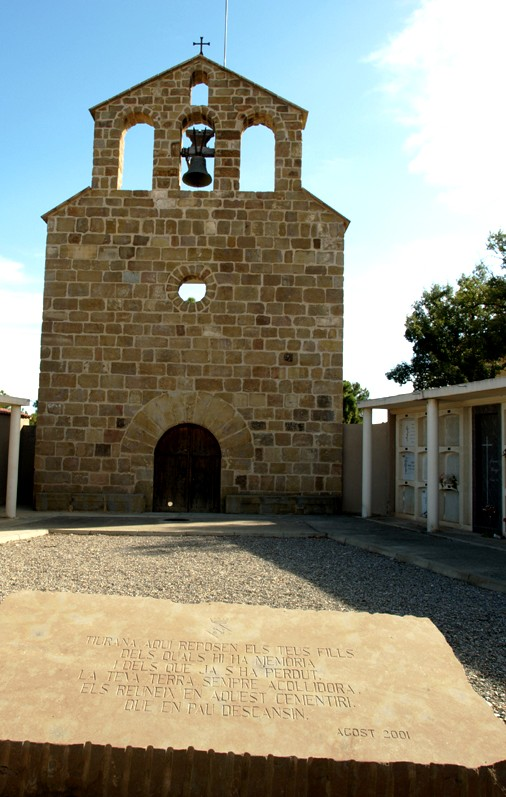
The facade of the Church of San Pedro, Tiurana

== See also ==
- List of reservoirs and dams in Spain
- List of missing landmarks in Spain
