= Teodoro de Mas y Nadal =

Spanish engineer and politician

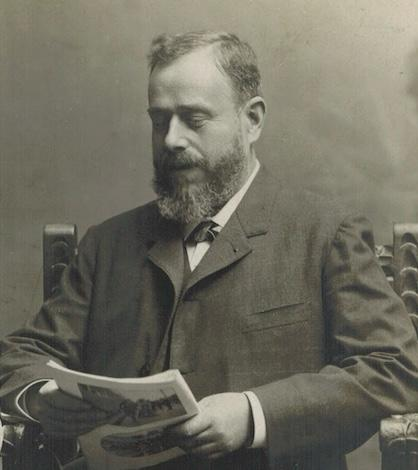
- Born: Teodoro de Mas y Nadal; 1858; Barcelona, Spain
- Died: 1936 (aged 77–78); Vilanova de Sau, Spain
- Occupations: entrepreneur, landowner
- Known for: engineer, politician
- Political party: Carlism

Teodoro de Mas y Nadal (Catalan: Teodor de Mas i Nadal; 1858–1936) was a Spanish engineer and politician. He contributed to the development of railway, road, hydrological and energy infrastructure, mostly in Catalonia, though also in other regions of Spain and in Argentina. Politically he supported the Traditionalist cause. Prior to 1919 and after 1931 he remained active in the Carlist ranks; in 1917–1919 he was member of the regional Catalan party executive. In the 1920s he headed regional Catalan structures of the breakaway Traditionalist grouping known as the Mellistas.

== Family and youth ==
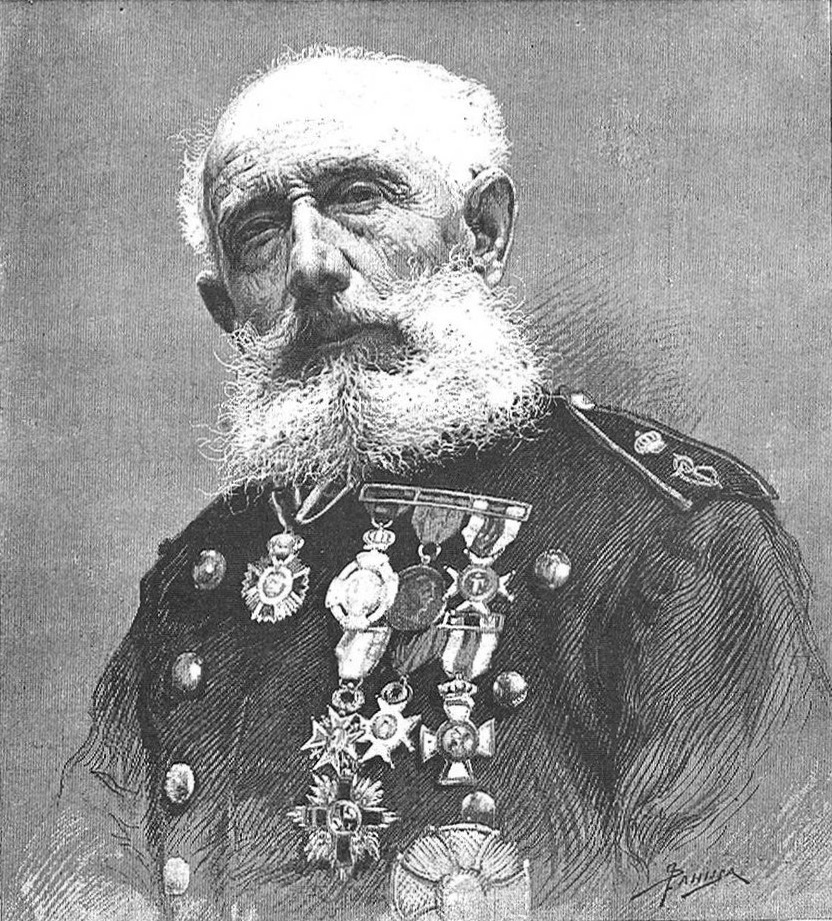
father

The landowner Mas family has been for centuries related to Osona. Teodoro's great-grandfather, Teodoro de Mas Solá (1774–1816), distinguished himself commanding anti-French insurgency during the Peninsular War. However, he is better known as husband of Joaquina de Vedruna, Teodoro's great-grandmother; already a widow, in 1825 she founded the Carmelite charity order and was declared saint in 1959. Their son and Teodoro's grandfather, Joaquín José de Mas y de Vedruna (1801–1873), sided with the legitimists during the First Carlist War and then went on exile. His son and Teodoro's father, Luis de Mas y Poudevida (1824–1895), as a 13-year-old joined his parent in the legitimist ranks. He then studied geodesy and topography in France, was involved in another Carlist attempt of 1848 and went on exile again. Author of a geodetic manual, back in Spain he engaged in hydraulic engineering and in the 1860s ran a technical college in Barcelona, an institution he founded himself; he also managed a local railway line.

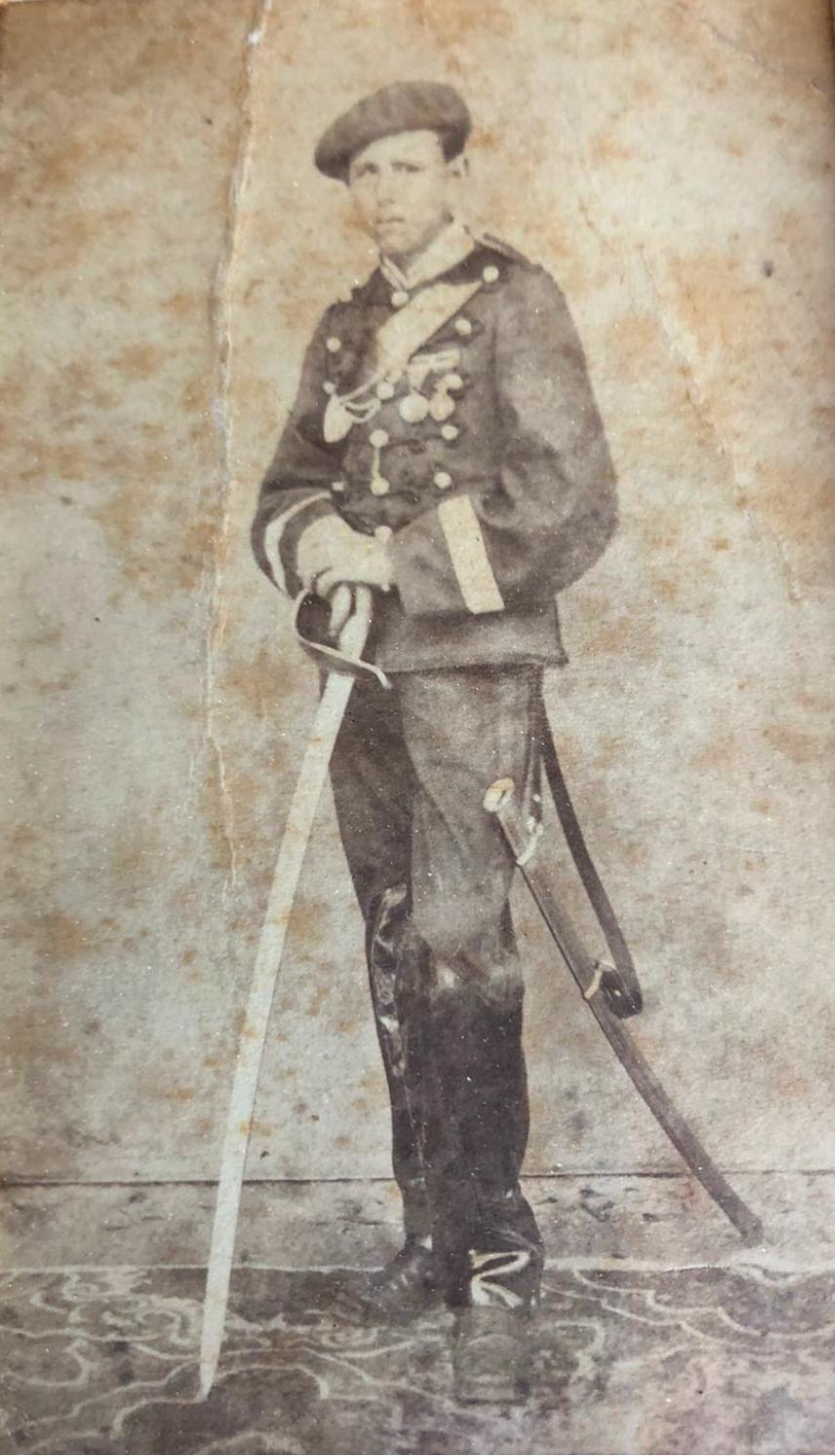
Mas as soldier

Luis de Mas married Elvira Nadal Valls (1833–1912); the couple lived at the Manso Escorial estate near Vich. They had at least 8 children, born between 1853 and the 1870s; Teodoro was the third in sequence, but the first son. Nothing is known of his early education. As a 14-year-old he escaped from home to join the legitimists during the Third Carlist War; twice rejected due to his age, he was eventually admitted to Real Cuerpo de Ingenieros; the structure was commanded by his own father. Already as an adolescent nominated alférez following the battle of Ripoll, he took part in various skirmishes in Catalonia until transferred to the Northern Front; he entered personal guard of the claimant and after the 1875 battle of Lumbier he was awarded Cruz del Mérito Militar. He was then sent on an unspecified mission to France, but was detained when trying to cross back to Spain and interned in Montauban until the end of hostilities.

None of the sources consulted provided information on Mas’ fate after the war, except that together with his father they spent a few years on exile. At unspecified time though probably in the late 1870s or early 1880s he studied engineering, most likely in France. He returned to Spain in 1883 latest, reportedly to take over the family economy. In 1884 he married Josefa Bach Puig (1865–1930), descendant to a Vich Liberal family. The couple settled at the Mas estate and had at least 7 children, born between 1885 and 1904. Two of his sons died in youth in 1910–1911, another one perished in 1937; none of the remaining brothers and sisters became a public figure. Among Teodoro's sons-in-law Juan Travería Pubill was the alcalde of Vich, while Manuel Gaus Ripoll gained his name as an architect. Teodoro's brother Luis was manager of El Legitimista Español, issued in Buenos Aires. Teodoro's brother-in-law, Antonio Bach Puig, was involved in Macia's conspiracy of 1924. Among 17 grandchildren the best known one is Manel Gausa de Mas, an architect and photographer.

== Engineer ==
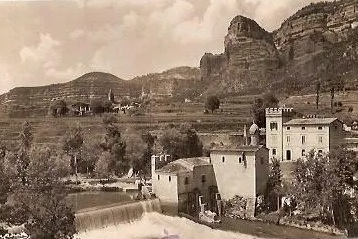
Moli de Sau hydro installations

It is not known exactly what discipline of engineering Mas has studied. He practiced in civil engineering, though he tried his hand at many sub-disciplines: railways, roads, hydro technical works, power generation and industrial facilities. He was first noted as engaged in construction works in 1884, the last such note comes from the 1910s. His projects focused mostly on Catalonia, though he was recorded also in León, La Mancha and in Argentina. A hagiographic note maintains that some of his endeavors were unsuccessful due to factors beyond his control; no independent source is available to confirm this claim.

The field which attracted most of Mas’ attention was hydro technical projects. Most of these works were focused on Catalonia; the only exception were the 1880s works at Saltos del Duero in the province of Salamanca. At unspecified time he engaged in a project related to the Monellots fonts, located near Vich; since the 1860s works supposed to use it as supply of water for domestic Vich usage were dragging on. Much more ambitious was a plan focused on the Noguera Pallaresa river; its waters were to be piped to Barcelona over a distance of some 100 km. None of the sources consulted provides information either on outcome of both projects or about commercial format of the enterprises. In 1901 Mas was granted a license to exploit waters of the Ter river, flowing through the Northern Catalonia; the business ran into difficulties, was re-defined commercially and continued at least into the early 1910s. It was the most successful of Mas’ projects; on his own real estate Molí de Sau he constructed a hydro power plant; using 15,000 V lines and on a distance of some 13 km it delivered electricity to Vich, where power was further distributed for domestic use via 500 V lines.

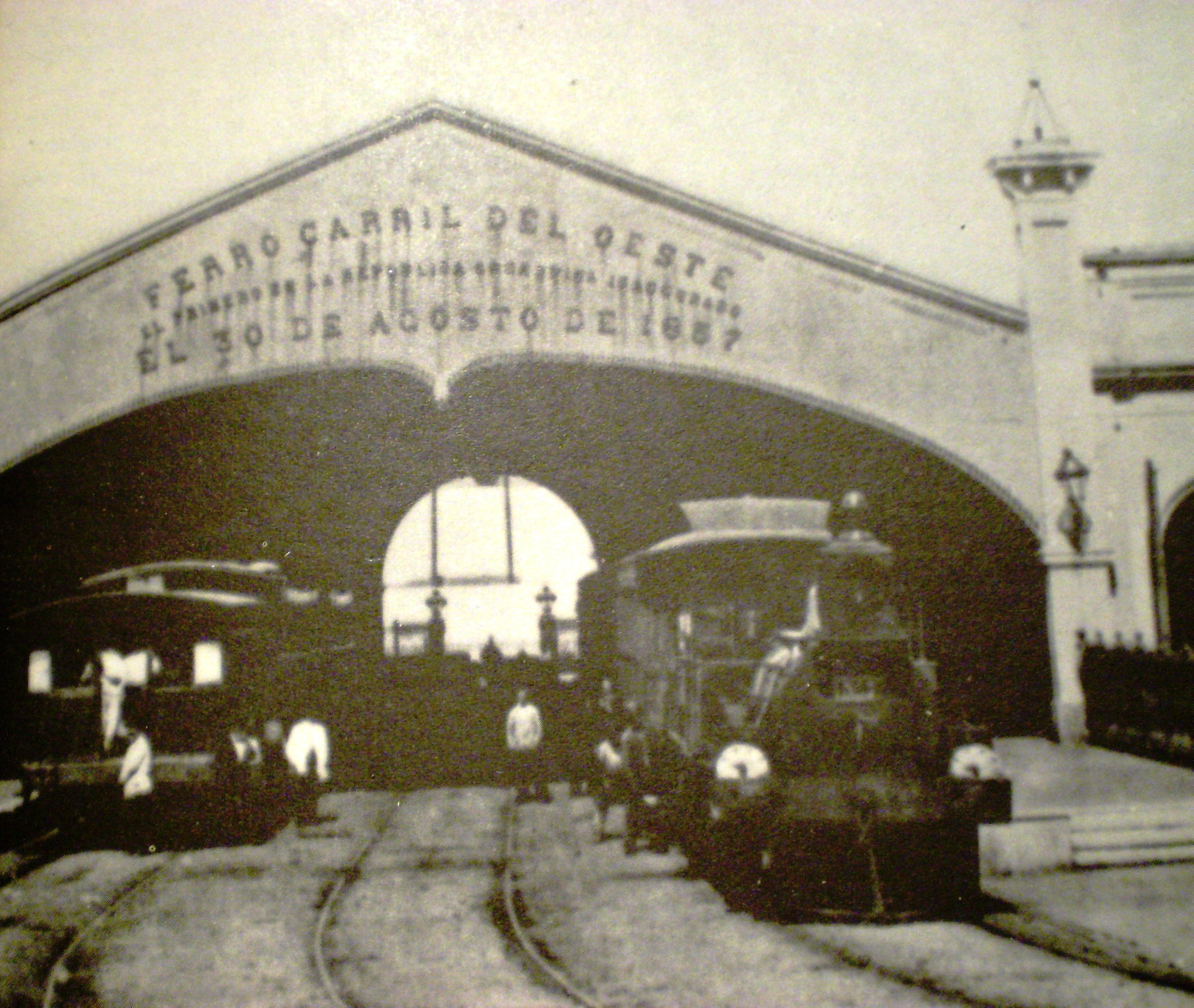
Buenos Aires, late 1880s

Railway transport kept Mas busy from the 1880s to the 1900s. Already in 1884 he was recorded as engaged in development of local network in the province of Salamanca, though no details are available. In the late 1880s he contributed to the buildup of railway infrastructure in the Argentinean province of Corrientes, vaguely noted as engrossed with “varios ferrocarriles”. In the early 1890s he was among promoters of a narrow-gauge railway line supposed to plug Vich into the already existent network; the track was to cross the Guilleries massif and join the Girona – Olot line in Pasteral d’Amer. He was granted the license for both construction and operation of the railway, but the project moved on grudgingly; in 1901 the license was renewed, but eventually the so-called Ferrocarril a la Selva failed to materialize. Another transport engineering discipline that Mas engaged in was road construction; in the mid–1880s he contributed to development of local network in the province of Albacete. Last but not least, he was engaged in construction of other industrial facilities; he is credited for design and construction of a La Fé ceramics factory in Buenos Aires.

== Politician: from inactivity to Carlist regional executive ==
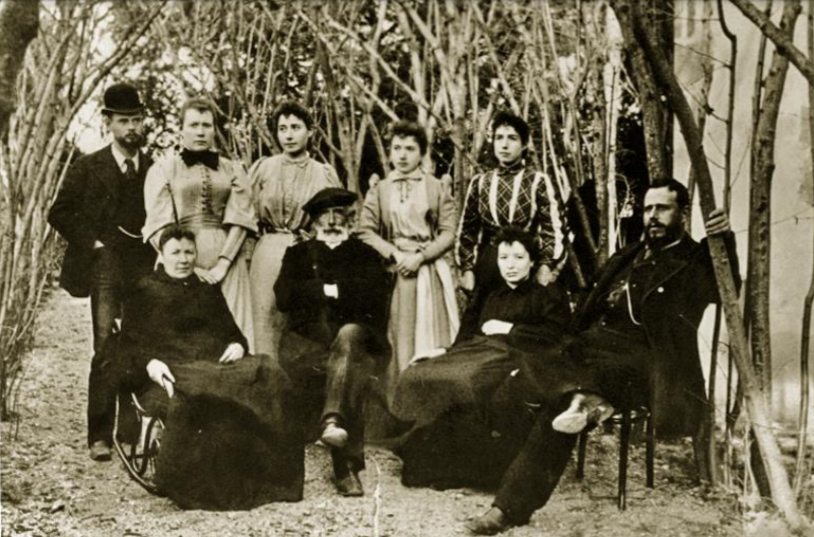
with family (1fR), 1890s

Following the juvenile wartime episode in the Carlist ranks Teodoro Mas for decades remained only moderately engaged in Traditionalist politics. In 1889 he joined the just opened Vich círculo of Alta Montanya, headed by his father, and entered its executive. However, information on his partisanship for the cause in the 1890s and 1900s is scarce and limited to various donations and subscriptions, e.g. to erect a monument to Zumalacárregui or to honor the party leader, Marqués de Cerralbo. An isolated case of his open bid for public post is the 1899 electoral campaign for the local self-government; Mas stood as a Carlist but despite the family prestige and own economic position in the county he failed to make it to the Vich ayuntamiento. Historiographic works on either Catalan or nationwide Traditionalist politics at the turn of the centuries do not record him as engaged in internal party structures, their propaganda or electoral campaigns, and this is despite Vich having been among most Carlist districts in Spain, with one Cortes ticket won in 1891 and another in 1907.

Nothing is known about Mas’ views on questions which caused vehement debates and undermined unity of the Catalan Carlism of the era: temptations of another insurgency, position versus rising Catalanism, violent urban pistolerismo or emerging syndicalism. One scholar counts him among most prestigious party men in Osona county, yet he provides no details and suggests that their activity was mostly about adhering to Catholic rituals and observing traditional social routine. Mas assumed more active stance in the mid–1910s, noted in the press as taking part in local county rallies and contributing few pieces to the party press. In 1916 de Cerralbo, in agreement with the regional jefé Junyent and the provincial one Duque de Solferino, nominated Mas the leader of the comarcal party structures in Vich. Following shakeup in the regional executive and resignation of Junyent, in 1917 Mas entered the Catalan Junta Regional, this time led by Solferino.

Carlist standard

The late 1910s was the period of Mas’ most active stand. In 1917 he was nominated jefe of Comité de Acción Política, a body supposed to co-ordinate all Carlist electoral action in Catalonia. The same year he fielded his candidature for the Barcelona Diputacíon Provincial. He stood in the Vich-Granollers district as a Jaimist representative in Coalició Anticaciquista, an alliance posing as anti-establishment alternative to the corrupted Restoration regime. The bid proved unsuccessful and he was the second worst-faring candidate in the district. Undeterred, Mas continued his electoral labors and prior to the national 1918 campaign he co-signed a grand Manifiesto. Itself a lecture of Traditionalist program, the text advocated corporative instead of popular suffrage, separate regional establishments, moderate monarchy headed by Jaime de Borbón, Spain “limited only by the sea and the Pyrenees” and protectionist and regulated economy; unorthodox proposals were only voluntary military service, “properly understood” freedom of education and economic separation between state and the Church. The efforts were moderately successful, as there were 2 Carlist MPs elected from Catalonia.

== Politician: from Mellista to reconciled Carlist ==
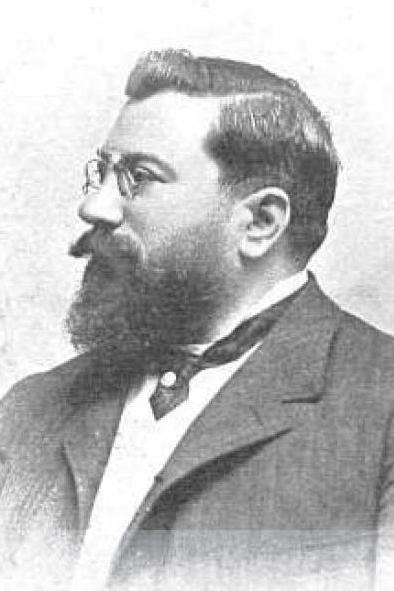
Vazquez de Mella

There is no evidence of Mas’ partisanship during a long-maturing conflict between the key party theorist Vázquez de Mella and the claimant Don Jaime; when it climaxed in the 1919 secession of the Mellistas, Mas joined the dissenters. The entire Junta Regional resigned in corpore and Mas declared his access to the new Partido Católico Tradicionalista. His manifesto read that “antes los principios que la persona del Rey”; the Jaimista press agonized about Mas’ rebelling against two generations of his ancestors. In late 1919 he became the Catalan leader of the Mellistas; he co-signed an address to the Carlist infant Don Alfonso Carlos in vain hope to attract him. In 1920–1921 he engaged in buildup of new structures and mobilization of public support; as “patriarca del tradicionalismo catalan” he headed rallies either in Barcelona or elsewhere, co-ordinated electoral action, welcomed de Mella in Catalonia, and hailed “enormous enthusiasm” of the Catalan Mellistas; indeed scholars note that Catalonia was among regions with most vehement support for the cause. However, the party structures were emerging slowly and there was growing rivalry between de Mella and his disciple, Víctor Pradera. In late 1922 Mas was co-presiding over the grand Mellista assembly in Zaragoza; it was entirely controlled by Pradera.

Structures of the new party failed to materialize before the 1923 coup of Primo de Rivera. Shortly afterwards Mas issued a manifiesto; it saluted “patriótico movimiento que el ejercito español acaba de hacer”, declared total adhesion of the Catalan Mellistas, and noted that the new regime should not only do away with the corrupt system, but its next step should be implementation of Traditionalist principles. The document played down dynastic issues and noted that any king adhering to Traditionalist doctrine would be legitimate. In 1923–1924 he kept supporting the new regime, e.g. heading “afirmación patriótico-tradicionalista” in Vich; however, his position changed. In 1925 he openly voiced skepticism about centralizing policy which he considered anti-Catalan; in the late 1920s the Vich Traditionalists withdrew from primoderiverista structures and few took part in organizations like Unión Patriótica or Somatén.

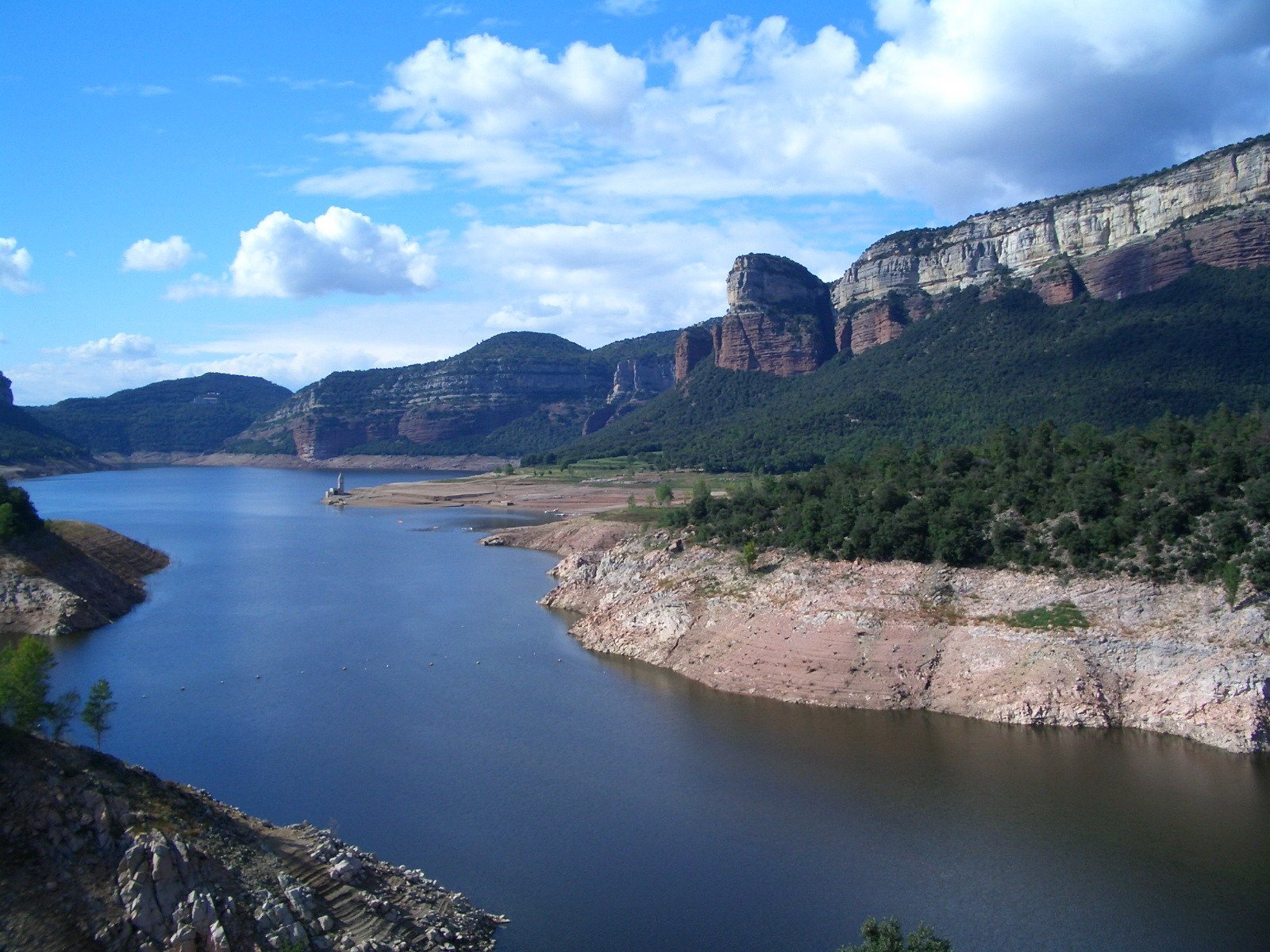
Moli de Sau estate today, under waters of the Sau Reservoir

When Second Republic was declared Mas was a widowed septuagenarian, politically tending to inactivity. However, he resumed public role following the death of Don Jaime; in late 1931 he declared loyalty to the new Carlist claimant Don Alfonso Carlos and re-entered Comunión Tradicionalista, which following 12 years of dissidence marked his return to orthodox Carlism. He did not assume any position in the party and enjoyed rather the status of a Traditionalist patriarch; his role was about occasionally appearing on public rallies, like in 1934, or donating money to the cause, like in 1936. Upon outbreak of the Civil War Mas fled to his property near Vilanova de Sau, but following few weeks he was tracked down by the anarchist-dominated Comitè Antifeixista of Vich. A hit-squad, led by Vicenç Coma Cruells, appeared at the Molí de Sau estate. Mas confronted them at the doorstep of his house and was shot together with his son-in-law.

== See also ==
- Carlism
- Traditionalism (Spain)

== Footnotes ==
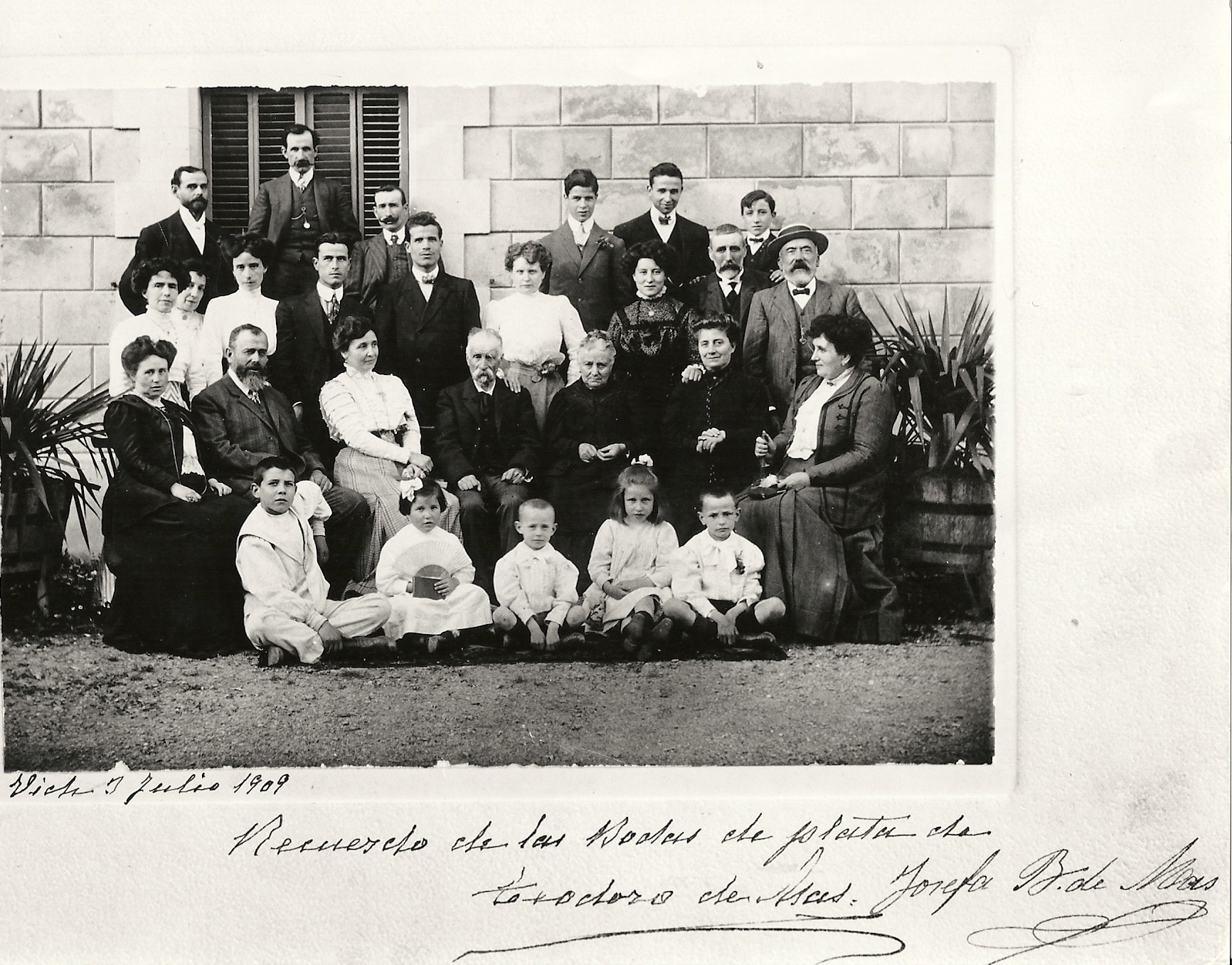
Mas with family, 1909
