= Augustobriga =

Augustobriga may refer to the following (Roman/Celtiberian) places in Iberia (Hispaniae) :

in Spain

- Ciudad Rodrigo, city
- El Puente del Arzobispo, in Toledo province
- Muro de Ágreda, a Roman colonia on the former territory of the Pellendones in Hispania Terraconensis province, founded by Augustus, later in the Roman Catholic Diocese of Tarazona
- Talavera la Vieja, in province of Cáceres, Extremadura.
