= Church of Mediano =

16th-century submerged church in Spain

Coordinates: 42.3195°N 0.2041°E

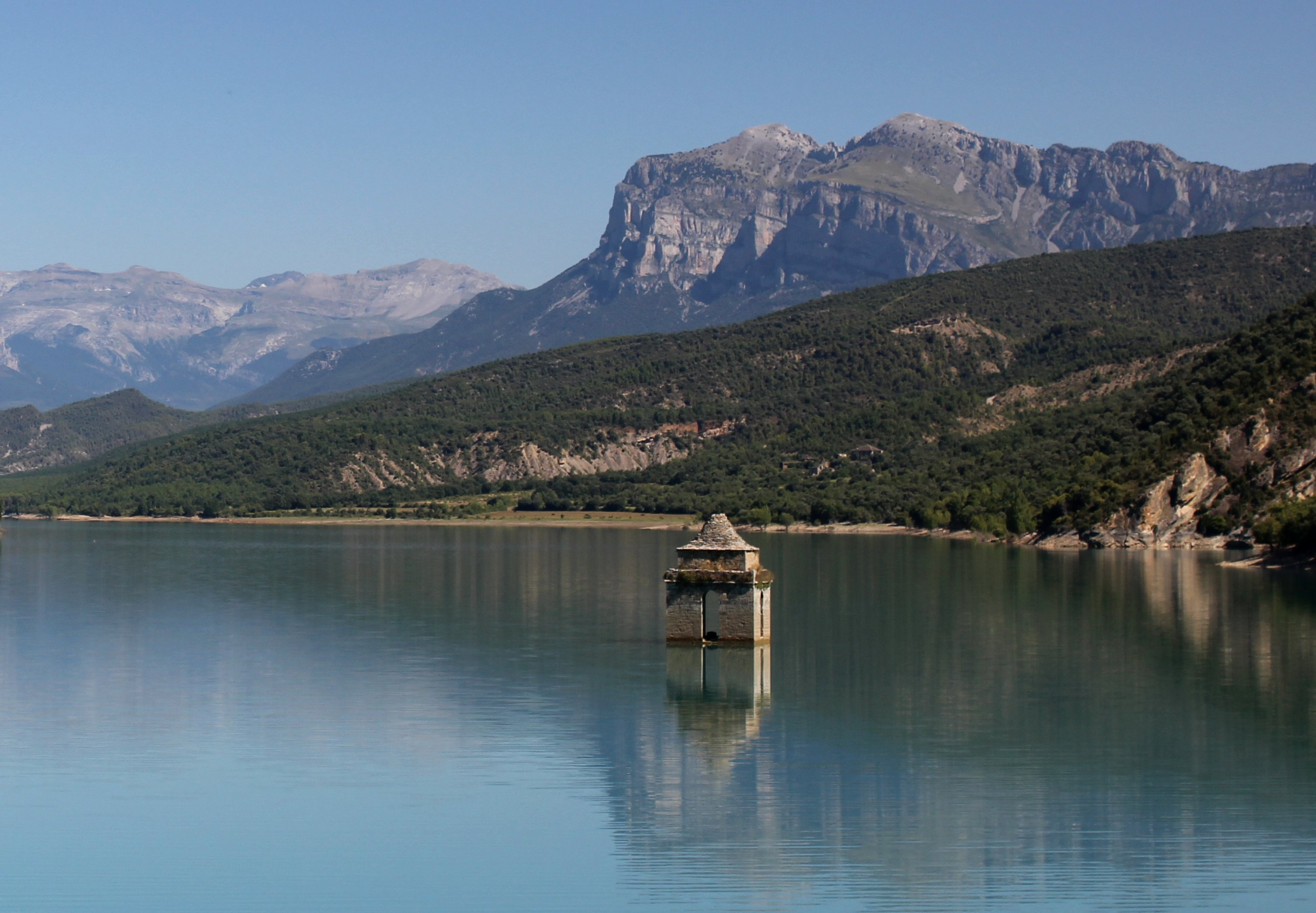
Church of Mediano submerged

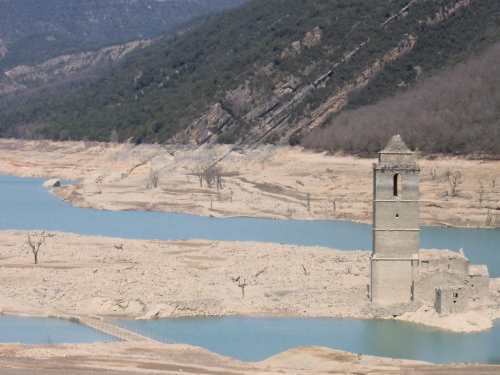
Church of Mediano

The Church of Mediano is a 16th-century submerged church located in Mediano, a submerged municipality in La Fueva, province of Huesca, Spain. Both were submerged by Embalse de Mediano.

It was submerged in 1960. In September 2026 the level of the water was so low you could walk to the tower.

== See also ==
- Catholic Church in Spain
- List of submerged places in Spain
