= Riaño, León =

Riaño
- Municipality
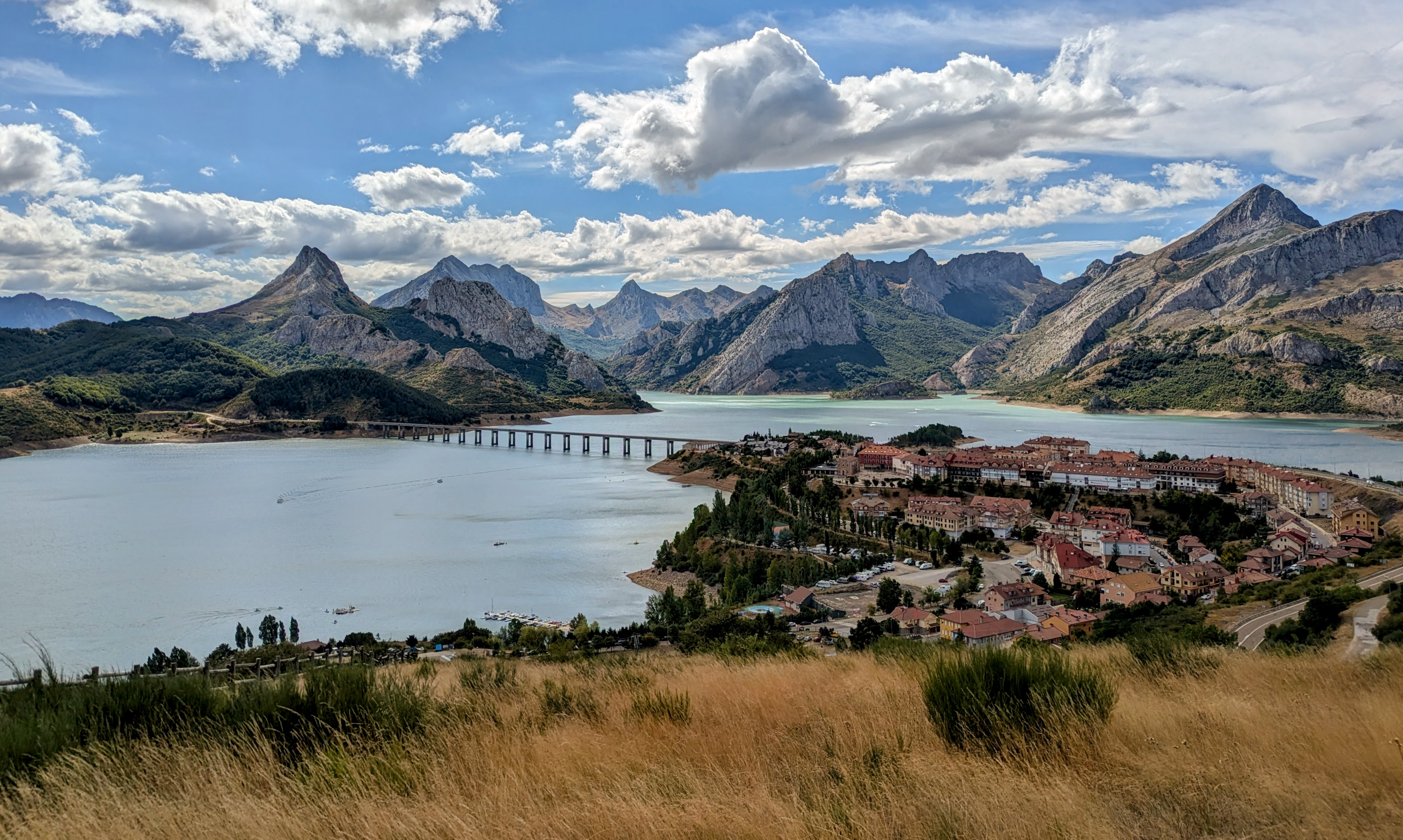
- New Riaño, the new village built to replace the submerged Riaño. The old village is located under the bridge. The mountain on the left is Pico Gilbo, and on the right, Pico Yordas.

- Flag Coat of arms

- Location in Spain
- Coordinates: 42°58′29″N 5°00′43″W
- Country: Spain
- Autonomous community: Castile and León
- Province: León
- Comarca: Montaña de Riaño

Government
  - Mayor: Manuel Javier Fernández Presa

Area
  - Total: 97.63 km^{2} (37.70 sq mi)
- Elevation: 1,112 m (3,648 ft)

Population (2025-01-01)
  - Total: 476
  - Density: 4.88/km^{2} (12.6/sq mi)
- Demonym: Riañéses
- Time zone: UTC+1 (CET)
  - Summer (DST): UTC+2 (CEST)
- Postal code: 24900
- Website: www.mriano.com

Riaño is a town and municipality located along the Esla River in the mountains of the province of León, in the autonomous community of Castile and León, northern Spain. Located 1,100 metres above sea level, it is in the Cantabrian Mountains near the foothills of the Picos de Europa. The village is across the reservoir from Pico Gilbo.

Due to planned construction of a dam and reservoir in the 1980s, for flood control and generation of hydroelectric power, the village and its lowlying farmland were submerged, as were six other villages in the associated dam project. The residents were relocated to New Riaño, built as a replacement higher above the reservoir waters. In 2010 the village had 532 residents.

== Pico Gilbo ==
Located on the banks of the Riaño reservoir, Pico Gilbo (1679 m) is also known as the Leonese Matterhorn, due to its slender and characteristic northern slope that resembles the Matterhorn in the Alps. Despite not being the highest in the area – Pico Pandián, Yordas and Peñas Pintas are higher – it is its most characteristic peak and the most photographed.

The two most common ascent routes are from Riaño and from Horcadas. Beginning from the viaduct across Riaño, a circular route to the summit is 8.2 km long with 675 m of elevation gain.

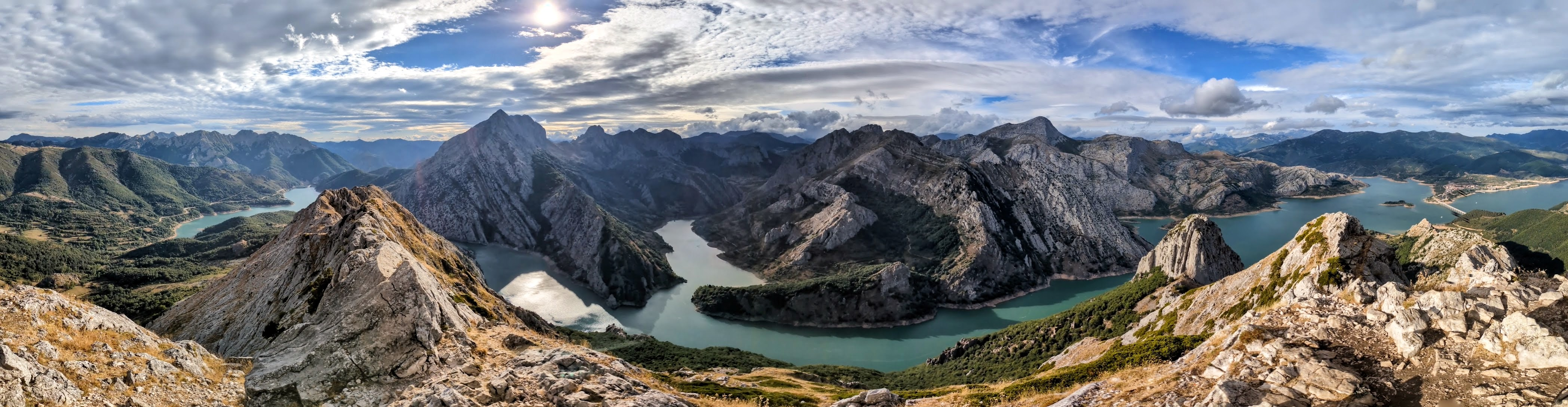
Panorama from the summit of Pico Gilbo, with Riaño on the right in the distance. The arms of the lake are known as the Leonese fjords.

== Gallery ==
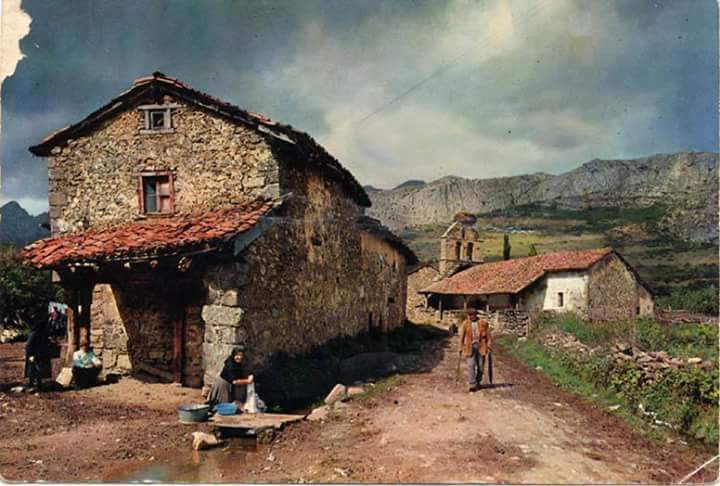
The hamlet of La Puerta in 1960

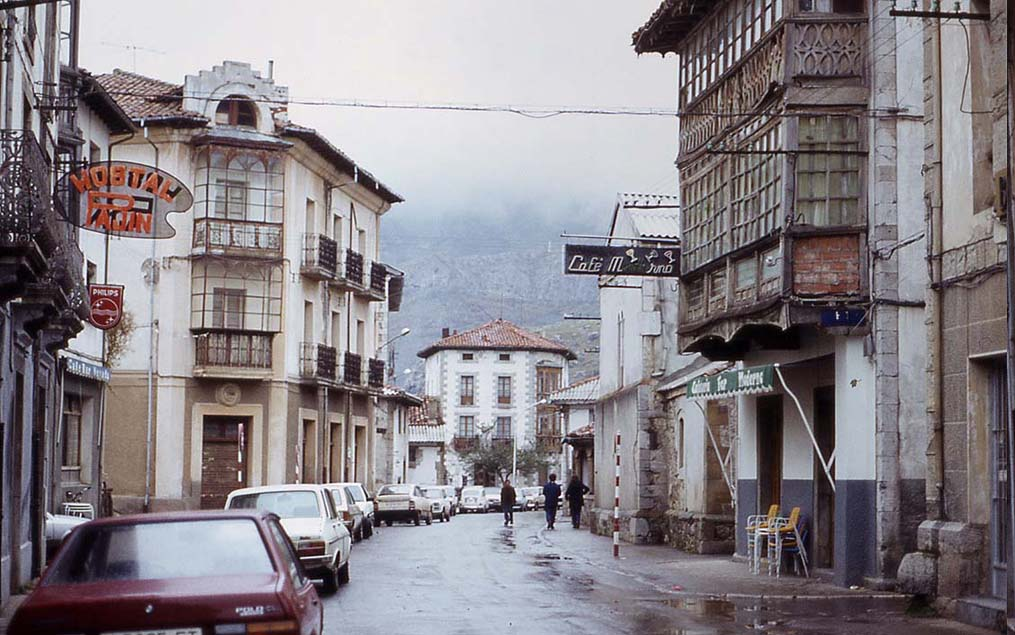
The town's main street in November 1984

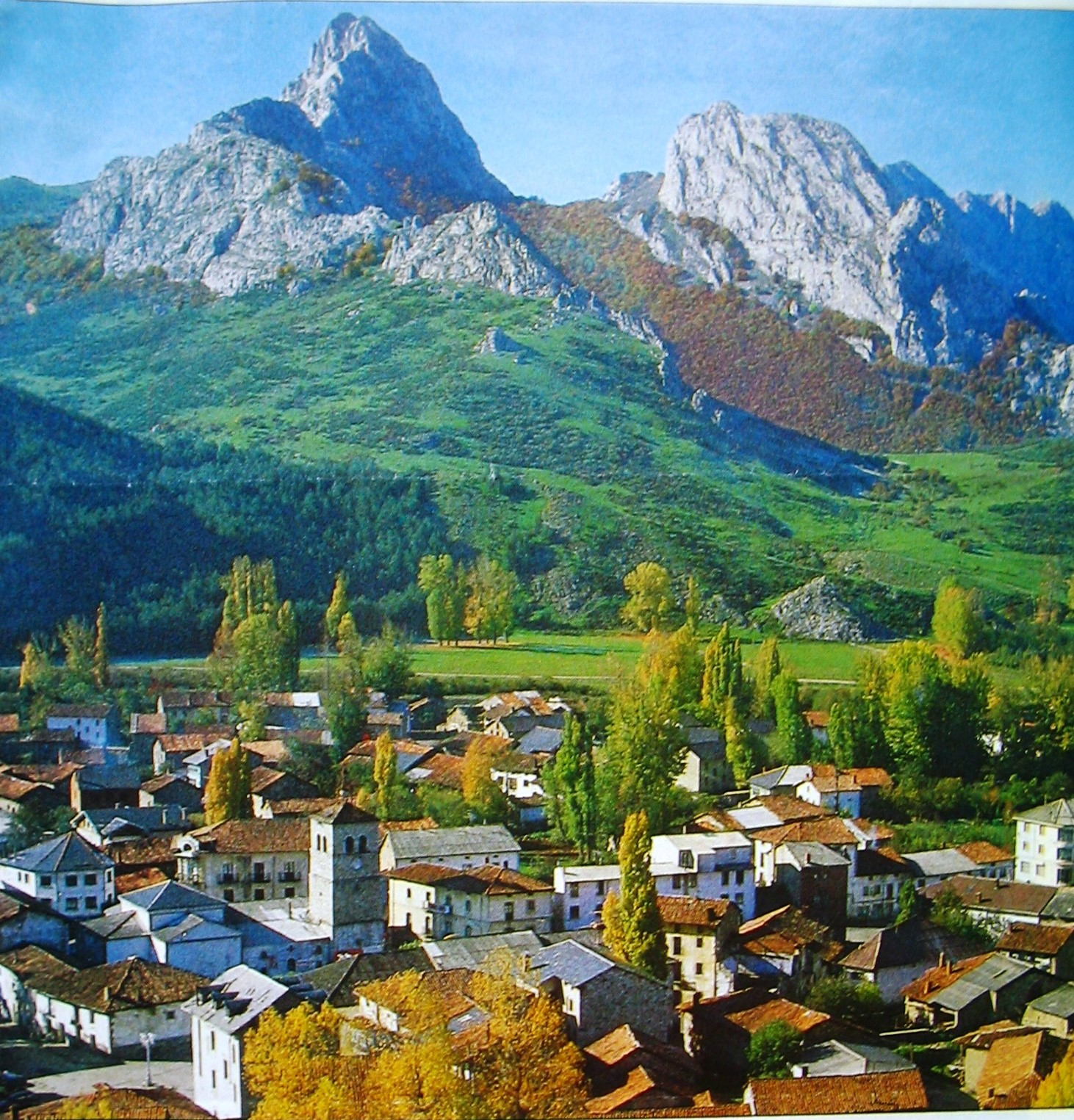
Riaño in 1986

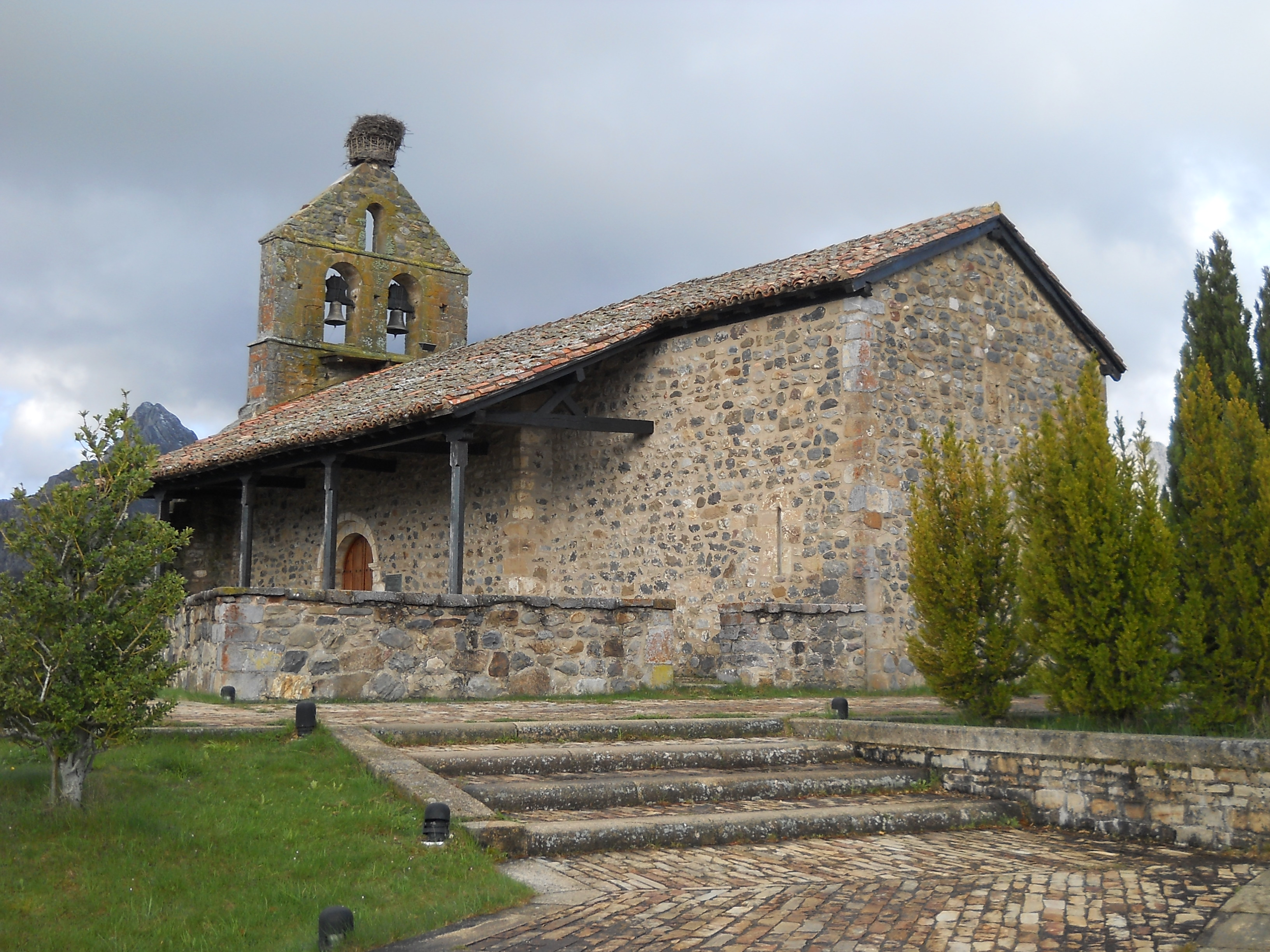
Church of Our Lady of the Rosary, a 13th century church relocated from La Puerta

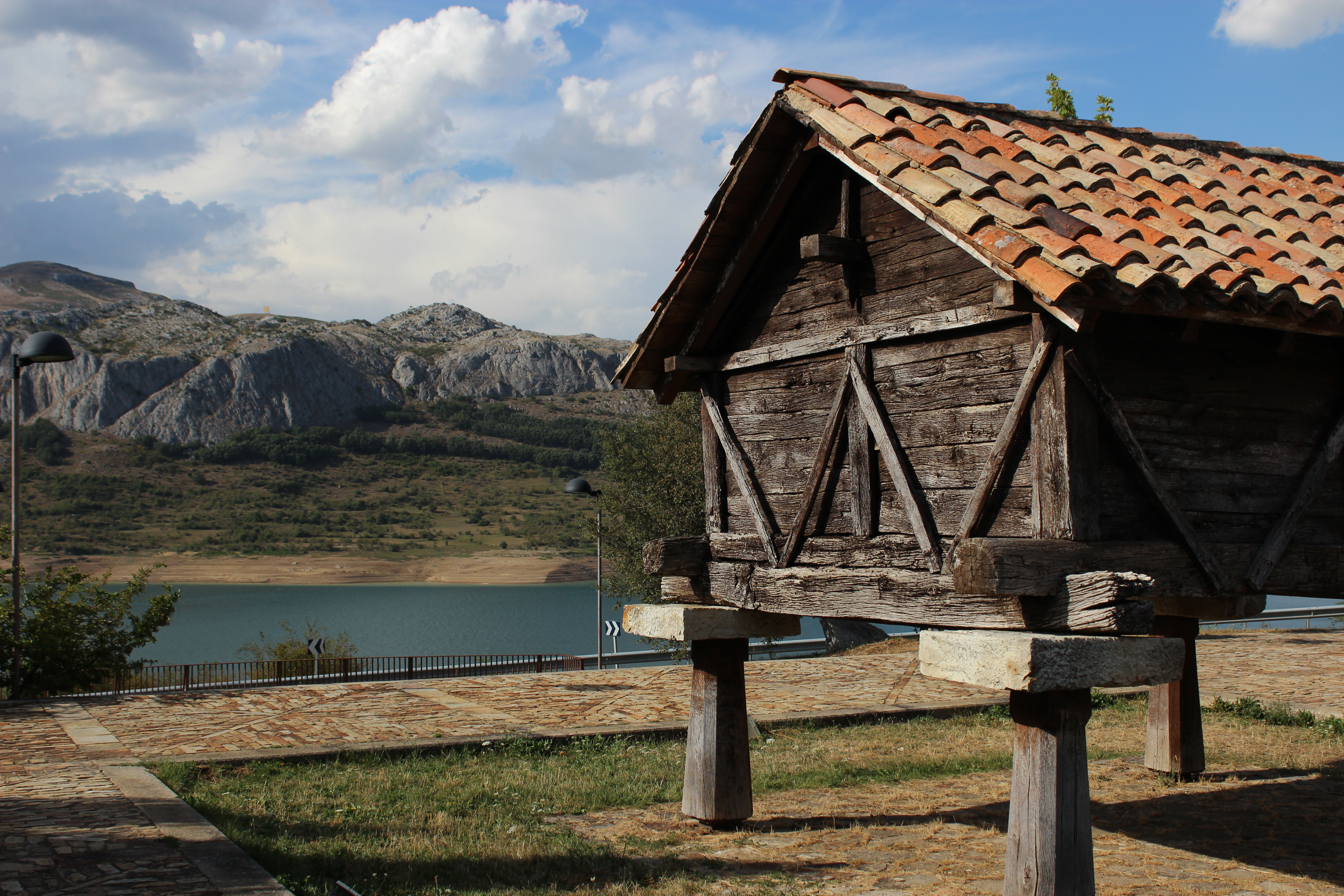
Hórreo de Salio (a granary)

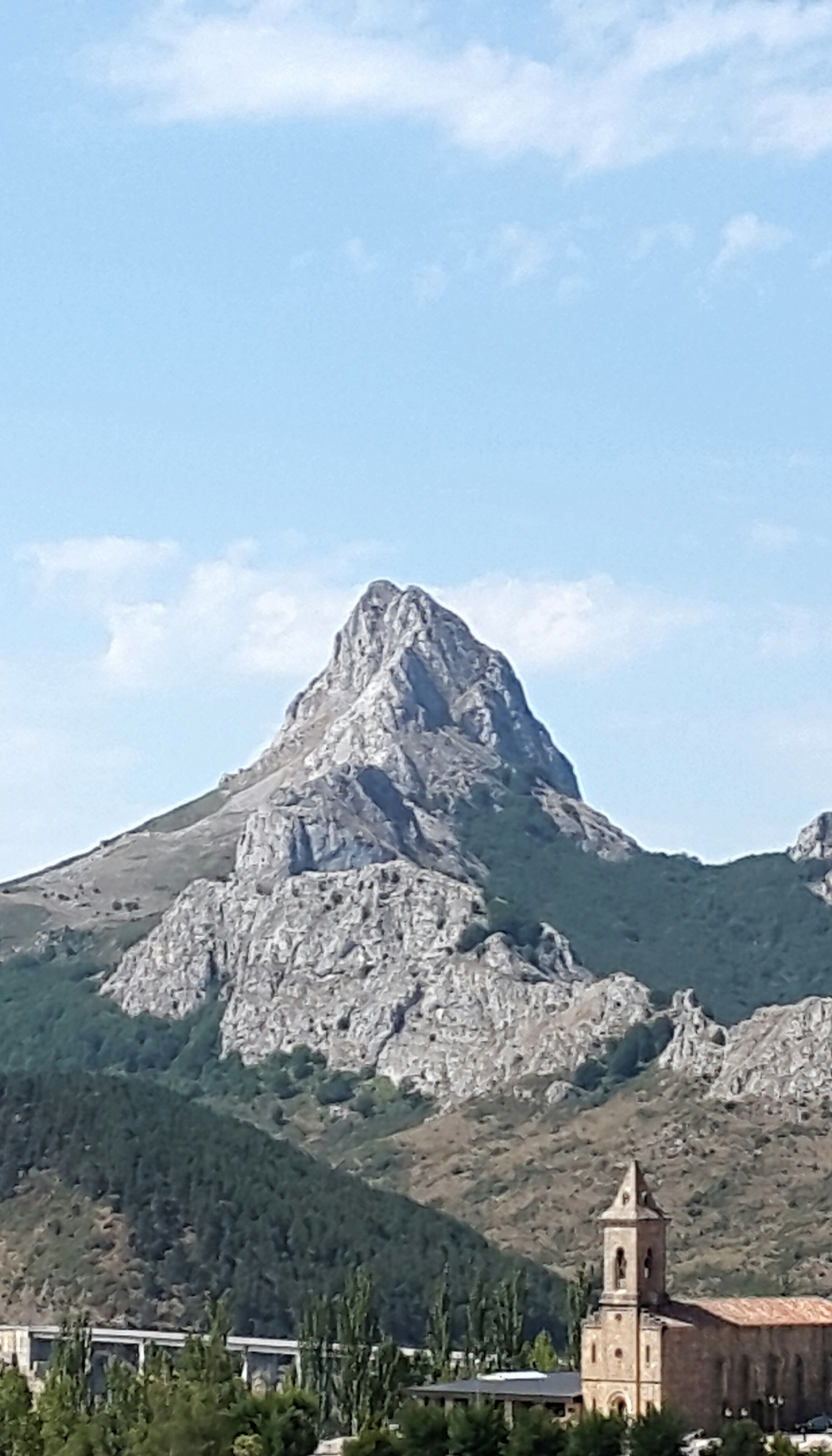
Pico Gilbo

== Noted residents and natives ==
- Imanol Arias, film actor

== See also ==
- List of submerged places in Spain
- List of missing landmarks in Spain
- Kingdom of León
- Leonese dialect
