= Old church of Sant Romà de Sau =

Church in Vilanova de Sau, Spain

Coordinates: 41.972754°N 2.393062°E

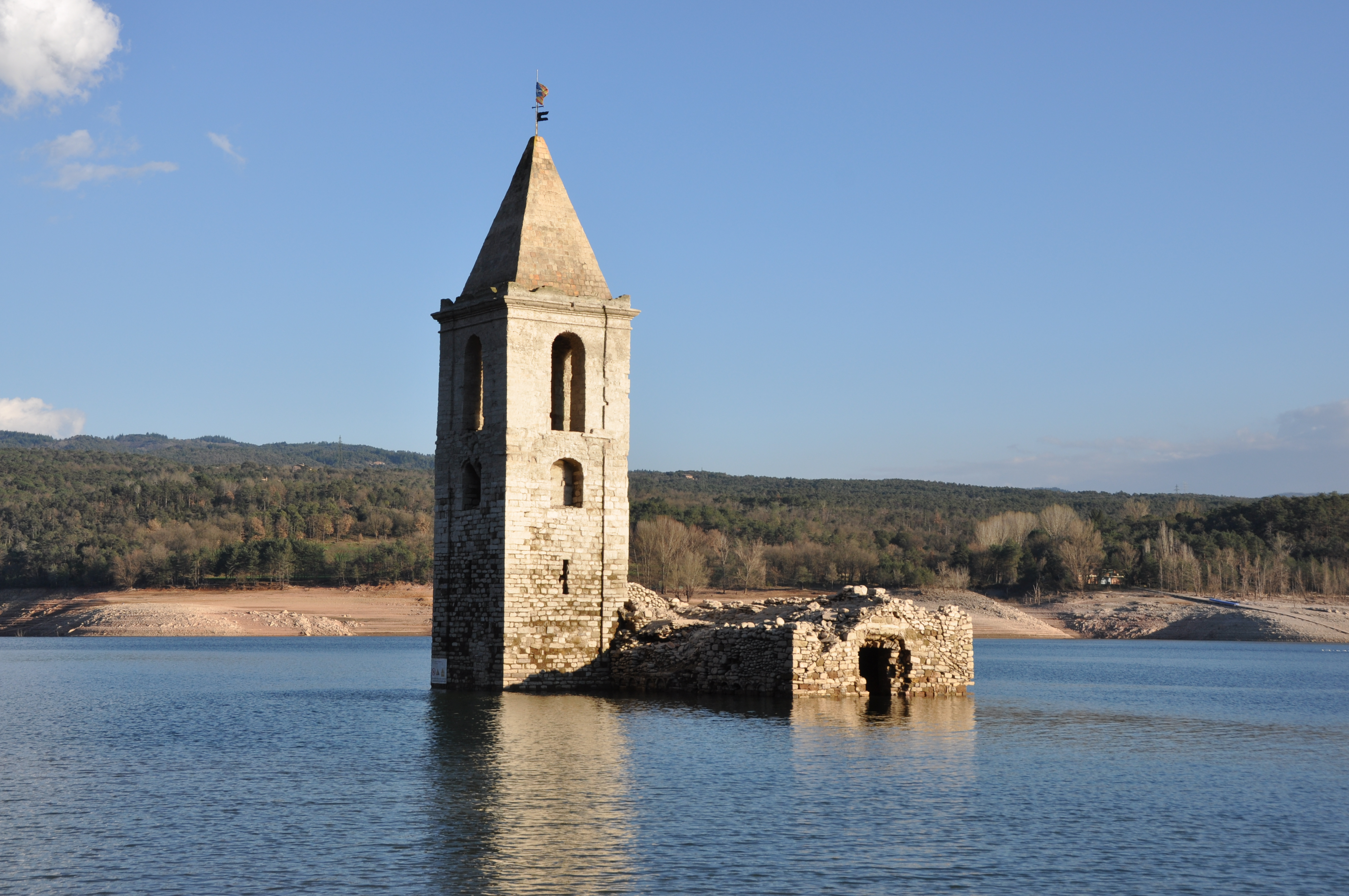
Church of Sant Romà de Sau. Vilanova de Sau, Spain. 11th century with later additions.

The old church of Sant Romà de Sau is an 11th-century Lombard Romanesque parish church of the abandoned old village of Sant Romà de Sau in the municipality of Vilanova de Sau, Osona county, in the mountain region of the Guilleries, Catalonia, Spain. Consecrated in 1062 and submerged in 1962 through the completion of the Sau Reservoir on the river Ter, the church has been recognised as the oldest standing submerged church worldwide by the Official World Record Organisation. While the historic church and village, normally 23 metres underwater, can be reached on foot during dry periods, the tip of the church's iconic bell tower is invariably visible above the surface, serving as a popular indicator of the level of water resources.

== History ==
The toponym Sau is considered by Joan Coromines to be pre-Roman, which indicates a continuous occupation of this remote and sparsely populated valley. The valley and village (villa) of Sau are first attested in 917 as belonging to the castle of Cornil, which disappears from record after 952. From 918 comes a reference to the locality of Pinos in the villa of Sau, probably to be identified with the later Domus del Pi. The roots of the feudal lordship of Sau date back to the wills of Borrell and Ingilrada, the parents of Borrell the bishop of Vic (1010–17), from 970 and 981 respectively. The parish church of St Romanus was consecrated in 1062. The estate of Sau consisted of five parishes, among them the parish of Virgin Mary at the nearby Vilanova de Sau dating from 1040. Ramon Borrell de Sau, who lived around 1120–30, was the first feudal lord whose name bore a reference to the locality. In 1181 Guerau de Sau, his mother Ermessenda and his sister Ramona placed the estate of Sau under the protection of the Hospitallers. By 1247 the lords of Sau were the vassals of the castellans and viscounts of Cabrera. In 1572 the dominion passed into the hands of Francesc de Montcada i de Cabrera, the first marquis of Aitona, whose successors held it until the abolition of feudal rights in the nineteenth century. By the sixteenth century, the centre of the lordship of Sau had moved to Vilanova de Sau.

The episcopal visitation of the diocesis of Vic from 1357–58 mentions the existence of two altars at the church of Sant Romà de Sau, dedicated to St Romanus and Virgin Mary. A later visitation from 1590 refers to a dossal depicting St Thomas the Abbot in the main altar of the church. The visitation of 1590, in seeking to enforce the sacrality of the churchyard in a period of shifting burial customs, also threatened to confiscate any laundry items hung out to dry in the cemetery.

In mid-19th century, the geographical dictionary of Pascual Madoz cited the foggy climate and poor water quality in Sant Romà as responsible for the prevalence of intermittent fevers, gastrointestinal and rheumatic disorders among the villagers. The settlement followed a spontaneous layout, with no clearly traced streets or squares, and only a third of the houses was described as "comfortable".

The church and the oldest settlement of Sau were submerged when a dam was built on the Ter river in 1962 as part of the large-scale dam-building campaign of the Francisco Franco regime. The water from the project is mainly used to supply Barcelona. Between 1951 and 1962, the inhabitants of the old village were expropriated and had to relocate. Some settled in the new village of Sant Romà de Sau, built on the Mas de l’Arbós hilltop site overlooking the reservoir from the south-east, where the engineers and workers engaged in the construction project were also housed. The new church of Sant Romà de Sau was completed by the architect Josep Maria Pericas in 1951. This new settlement enjoyed little success and only 38 inhabitants remain as of 2021.

== Architecture ==
The church suffered damage during an earthquake in 1425 and was subsequently renovated and enlarged. Due to the poor state of preservation it is difficult to distinguish the building phases of the church clearly, although at least in some places different material was used. The Catalan hiking pioneer Artur Osona i Formentí noted in 1882 a recent restoration to the church, which he judged to be in "fairly bad taste". In addition, the interior of the bell tower was plastered over before submersion to prevent collapse.

The church is built of stone and consists of a single nave, with no apse preserved. Its main vault is ruined. The southern wall features a large arcade, while the northern wall shows the shift in building material from dressed stone to river boulders above the level of the Lombard band of blind arches. To the north rises a three-storey bell tower, whose second floor has bifora windows with plain capitals, a Lombard band and serrated mouldings at the top.

Above the old village, on the southern slopes of Mount Tavertet, there are the ruins of two masos, of which the one called Pi has been recently excavated, and further up on the Força hill those of a castle, to be identified with the Roca de Sau mentioned from 1247, a likely successor to the earlier castle of Cornil. An early plan of the domus del Pi was produced by Pericas, who worked on the castles of the Osona county from 1906.

The village also had a five-arch humpback bridge begun in 1390 and completed after 1412, which carried a major public road across the Ter.

== In culture ==
Ignasi Ferrés i Iquino shot his Closed Exit (1955) in the old village of Sant Romà de Sau, and a number of historic house interiors appear in the film.

== See also ==
- List of submerged places in Spain

== See also ==
- Graun im Vinschgau
