= Portomarín =

Coordinates: 42°48′26″N 7°36′57″W

- Municipality
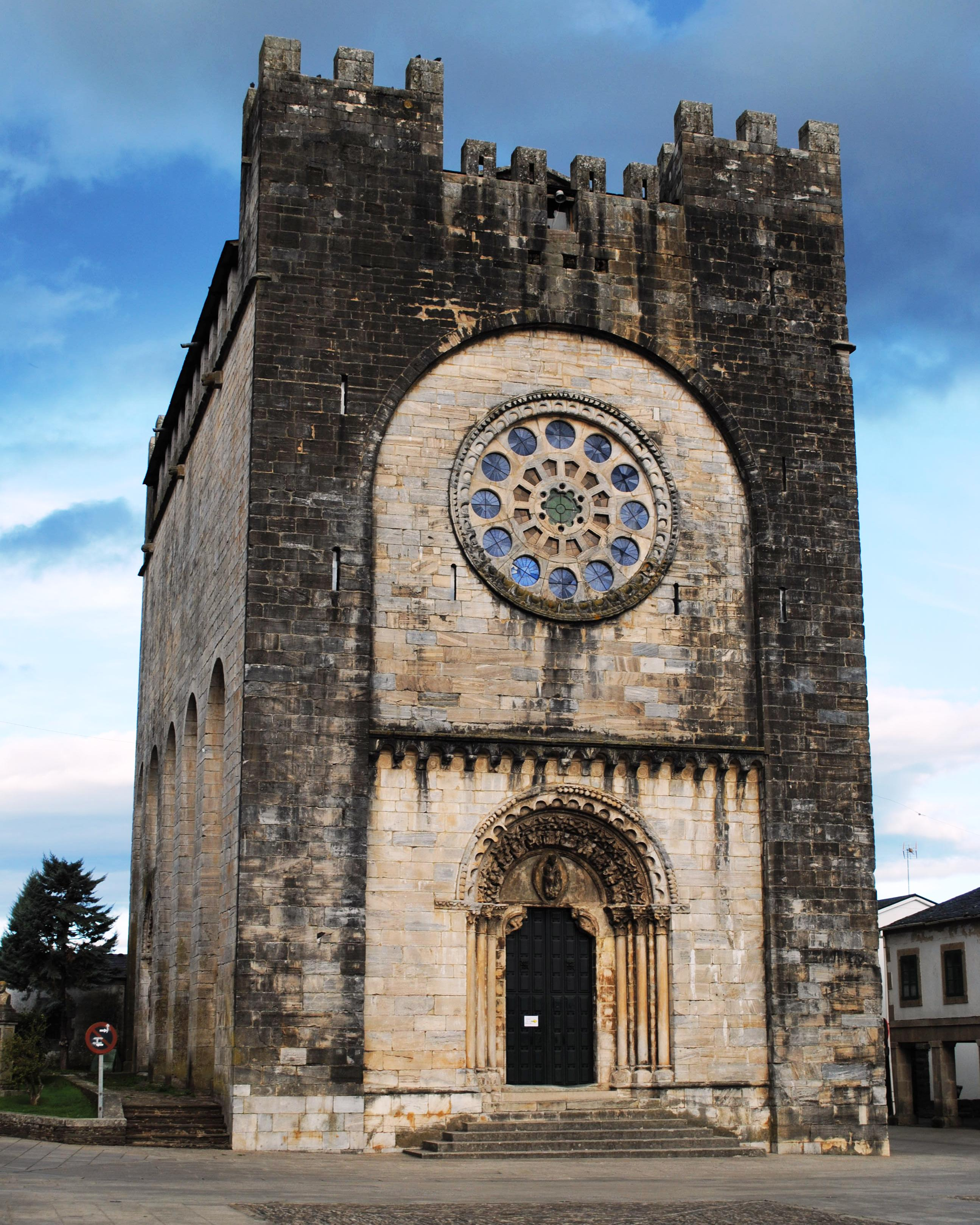
- Church of San Xoán

- Flag Coat of arms

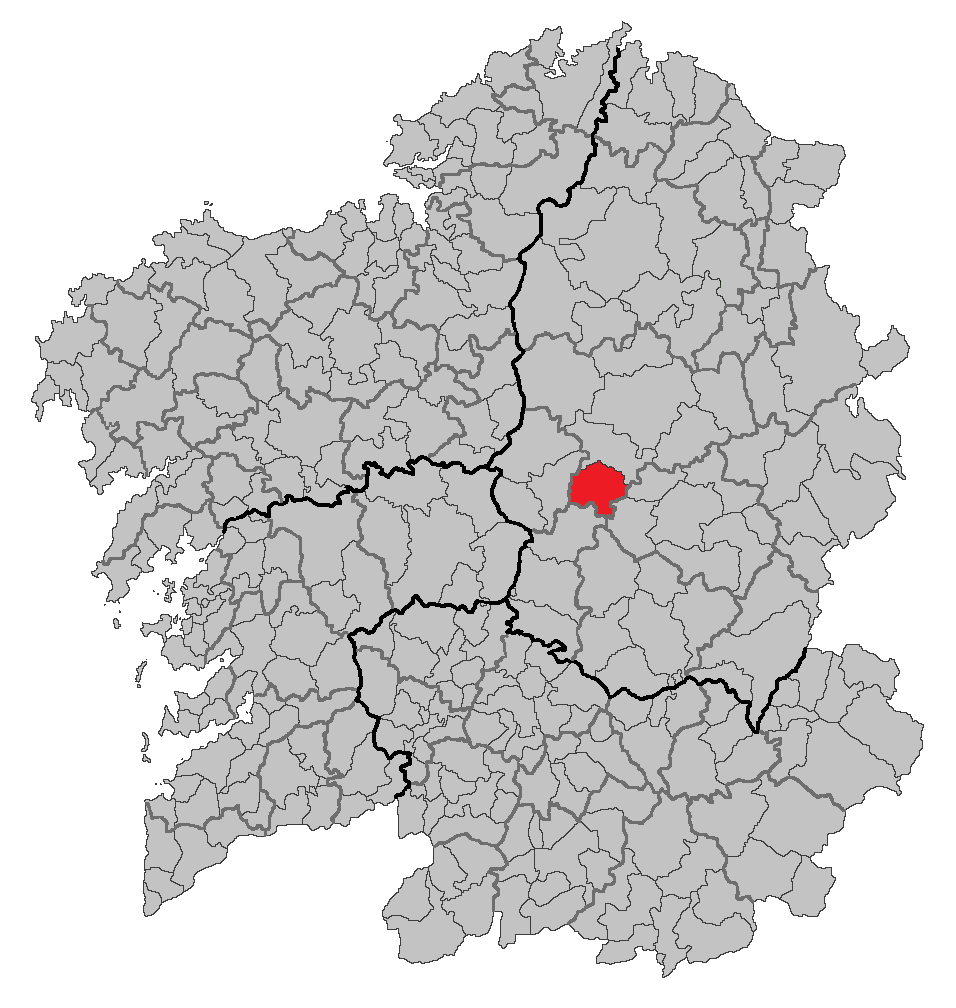
- Location of Portomarín.

- Location in Spain
- Country: Spain
- Autonomous community: Galicia
- Province: Lugo
- Comarca: Lugo

Government
  - Alcalde: Pablo Rivas (PPdeG)

Area
  - Total: 115.10 km^{2} (44.44 sq mi)

Population (2023)
  - Total: 1,345
  - Density: 11.69/km^{2} (30.27/sq mi)
- Demonym: Portomarinense
- Time zone: UTC+1 (CET)
  - Summer (DST): UTC+2 (CEST)
- Postal code: 27170
- Website: Official website

Portomarín is a municipality in the province Lugo, in the autonomous community of Galicia, Spain. It belongs to the comarca of Lugo. The town has a population of 1345 (Spanish 2023 Census) and an area of 115 km². It is one of the towns in the pilgrimage route known as the French Way, part of the Camino de Santiago.

The town of Portomarín was built next to a Roman bridge over the Miño River and rebuilt during the Middle Ages.

== New village ==
In the 1960s the Miño River was dammed to create the Belesar reservoir, putting the old village of Portomarín under water. The most historic buildings of the town were moved brick by brick and reconstructed in the new town, including its castle-style main church: Church of San Juan of Portomarín.

In the seasons when the dam is at low level, the remains of ancient buildings, the waterfront and the old bridge are still visible.

== Parishes ==
- Bagude (San Bartolomeu)
- Caborrecelle (San Xulián)
- O Castro de Soengas (San Martiño)
- Castromaior (Santa María)
- Cortapezas (Santa María)

== Demography ==
From: INE Archiv
