= Church of San Xoán, Portomarín =

Temple-fortress in Galicia, Spain

Coordinates: 42.8077°N 7.6155°W

Church of San Xoán
- Igrexa de San Xoán de Malta
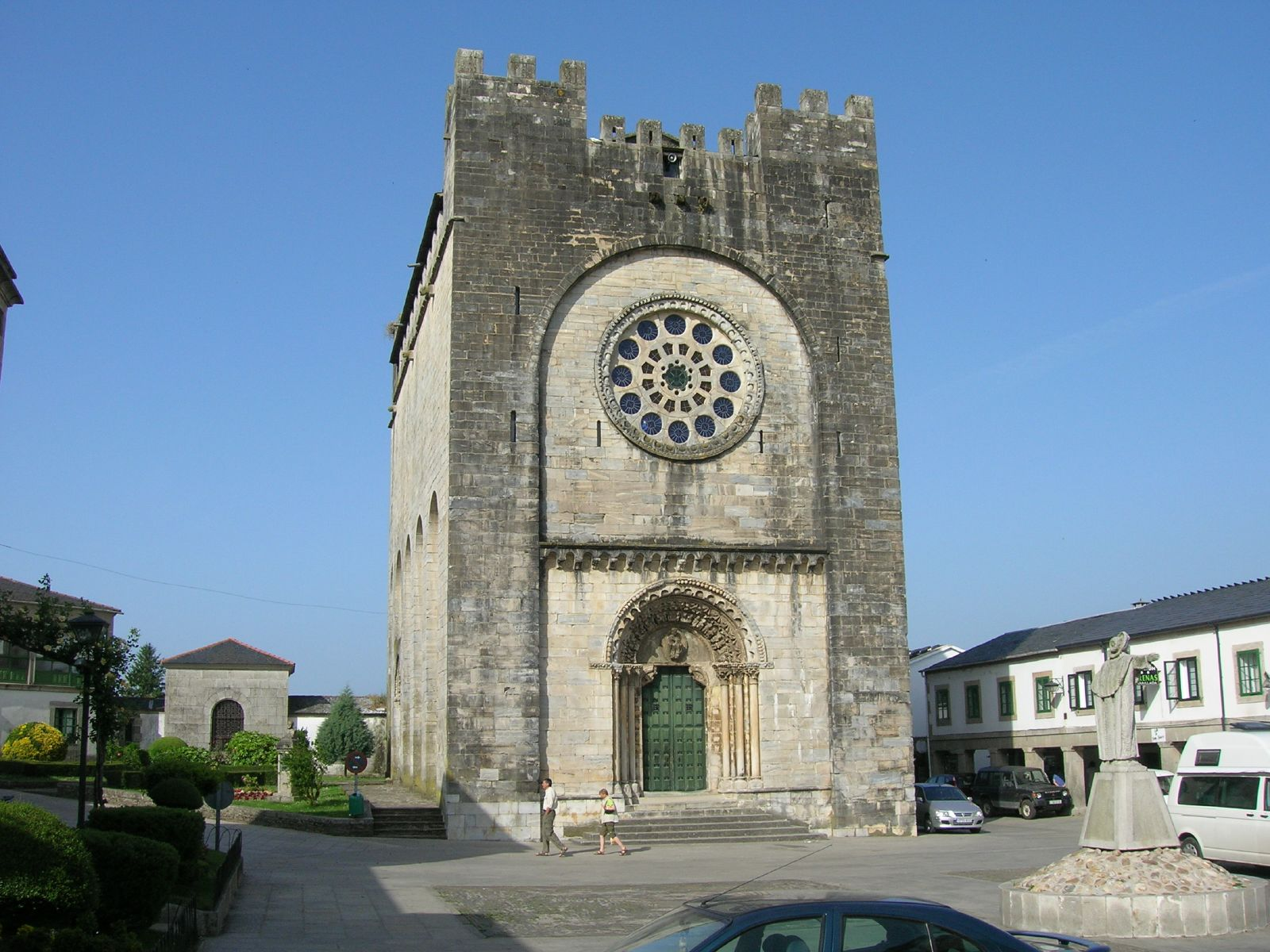

Religion
- Affiliation: Roman Catholic
- Ecclesiastical or organizational status: Church

Location
- Location: Portomarín, Galicia, Spain
- Interactive map of Church of San Xoán

Architecture
- Style: Romanesque

The Church of San Xoán (or Saint John) of Portomarín is a temple-fortress of the Order of St John of Jerusalem, in the Galician town of Portomarín, Spain.

== Features ==
It is an unusual Late Romanesque temple as it is designed to be both a church and a castle and so has architectural characteristics of both buildings. As a church it has one barrel vaulted nave, a semicircular apse and all the typical decorations of Romanesque churches; these include a carved portal with archivolts, rose windows and carved capitals. As a castle its perimeter is surrounded by merlons, it has four defense towers (one at each corner), while behind it lies an adarve, a defensive street. The north west tower currently has a stork's nest with two young (2011). The church was relocated to its current position from the valley in the 1960s when the river was flooded to form a reservoir.

== Strategic importance ==
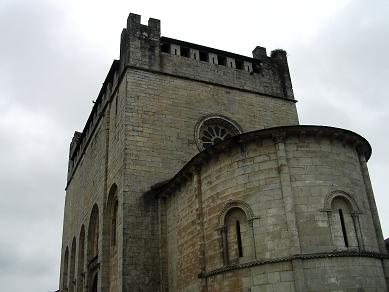
View from the apse

It is situated on the principal route of the Way of St. James to Santiago de Compostela, where other Templar and Knight Hospitaller churches and castles were constructed as a result of the effort of the Hospital Orders to protect the way to the tomb of Santiago; others include the churches of Torres del Río, Eunate and the Castle of Ponferrada.
