= Vilanova de Sau =

- Municipality
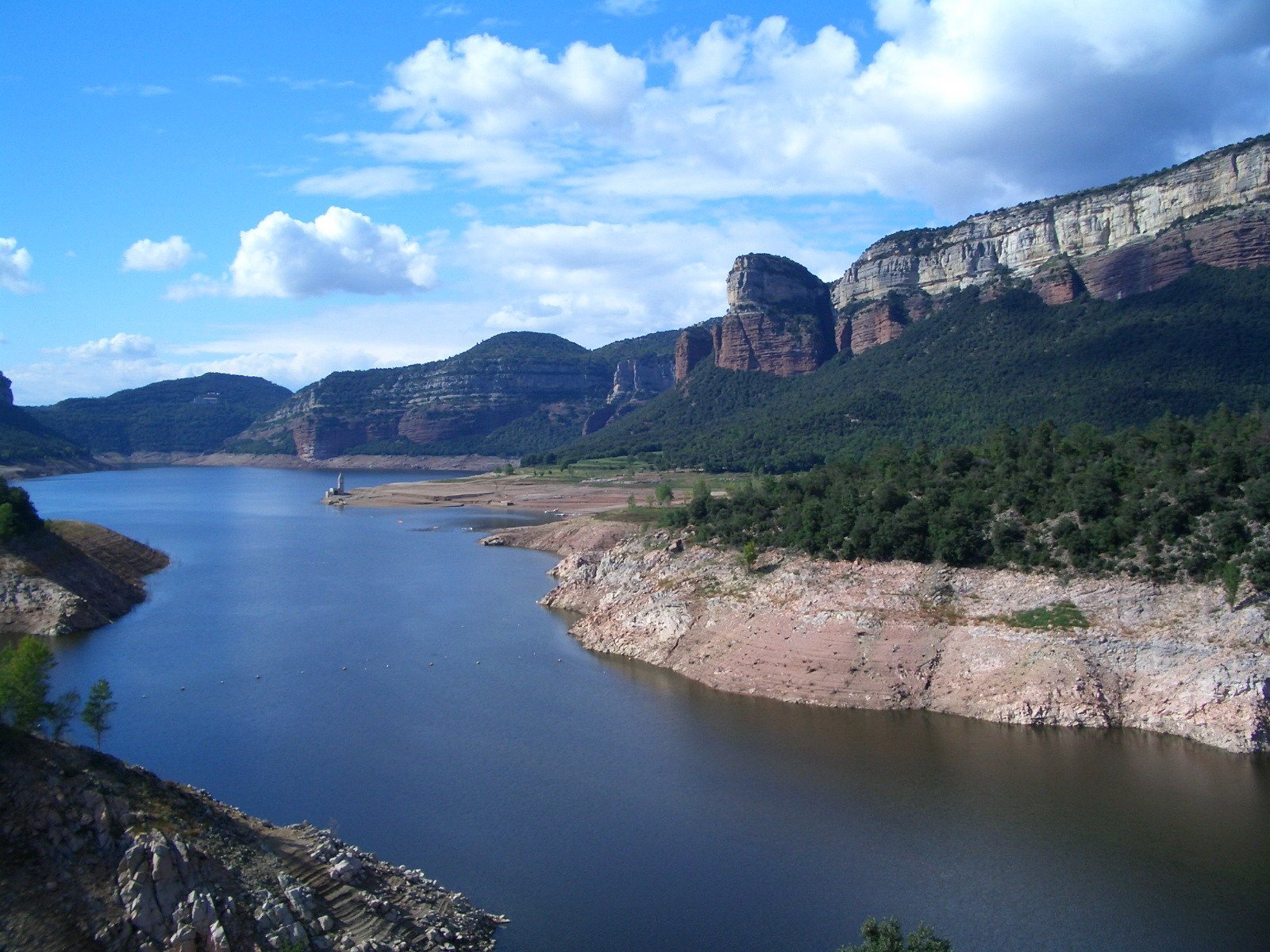
- Pantà de Sau (Sau Reservoir)

- Flag Coat of arms

- Location in Catalonia Vilanova de Sau (Spain)
- Coordinates: 41°57′N 2°23′E
- Country: Spain
- Community: Catalonia
- Province: Barcelona
- Comarca: Osona

Government
  - Mayor: Joan Riera Comellas (2015)

Area
  - Total: 58.8 km^{2} (22.7 sq mi)
- Elevation: 558 m (1,831 ft)

Population (2025-01-01)
  - Total: 325
  - Density: 5.53/km^{2} (14.3/sq mi)
- Demonym: Vilanovenc
- Website: vilanovadesau.cat

Vilanova de Sau (Catalan pronunciation: [ˌbiləˈnɔβə ðə ˈsaw]) is a town in the comarca of the Osona in Catalonia, eastern Spain. It is situated in the valley called Sau. The Ter river runs through the valley, now dammed into Pantà de Sau, a reservoir which is in the municipal territory of Vilanova de Sau, and is a tourist attraction and base for water sports and hiking. The reservoir houses the submerged Church of Sant Romà.

The municipality is linked to Vic and the C-25 (Eix transversal, Girona-Lleida) by the N-141 road.
