= Pedrosa del Rey =

Pedrosa del Rey, Spain
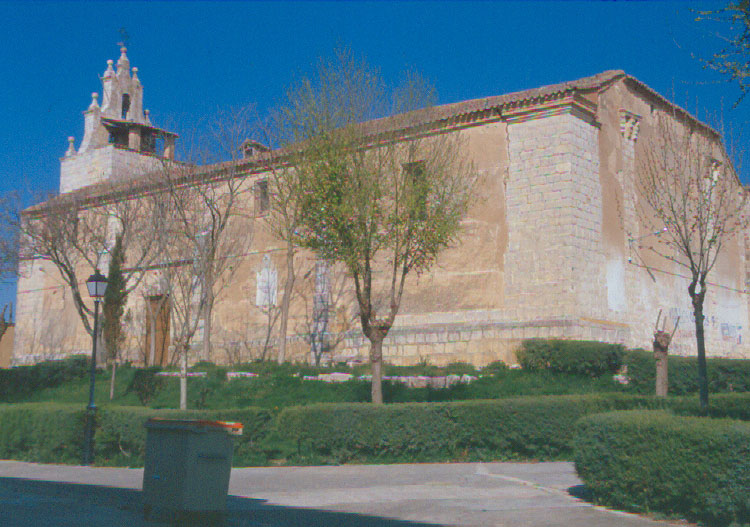
- Coordinates: 41°42′8″N 4°29′0″W
- Country: Spain
- Autonomous community: Castile and León
- Province: Valladolid
- Municipality: Pedrosa del Rey

Area
  - Total: 52 km^{2} (20 sq mi)

Population (2025-01-01)
  - Total: 147
  - Density: 2.8/km^{2} (7.3/sq mi)
- Time zone: UTC+1 (CET)
  - Summer (DST): UTC+2 (CEST)

Pedrosa del Rey is a municipality located in the province of Valladolid, Castile and León, Spain. According to the 2004 census (INE), the municipality has a population of 216 inhabitants.
