= Sau Reservoir =

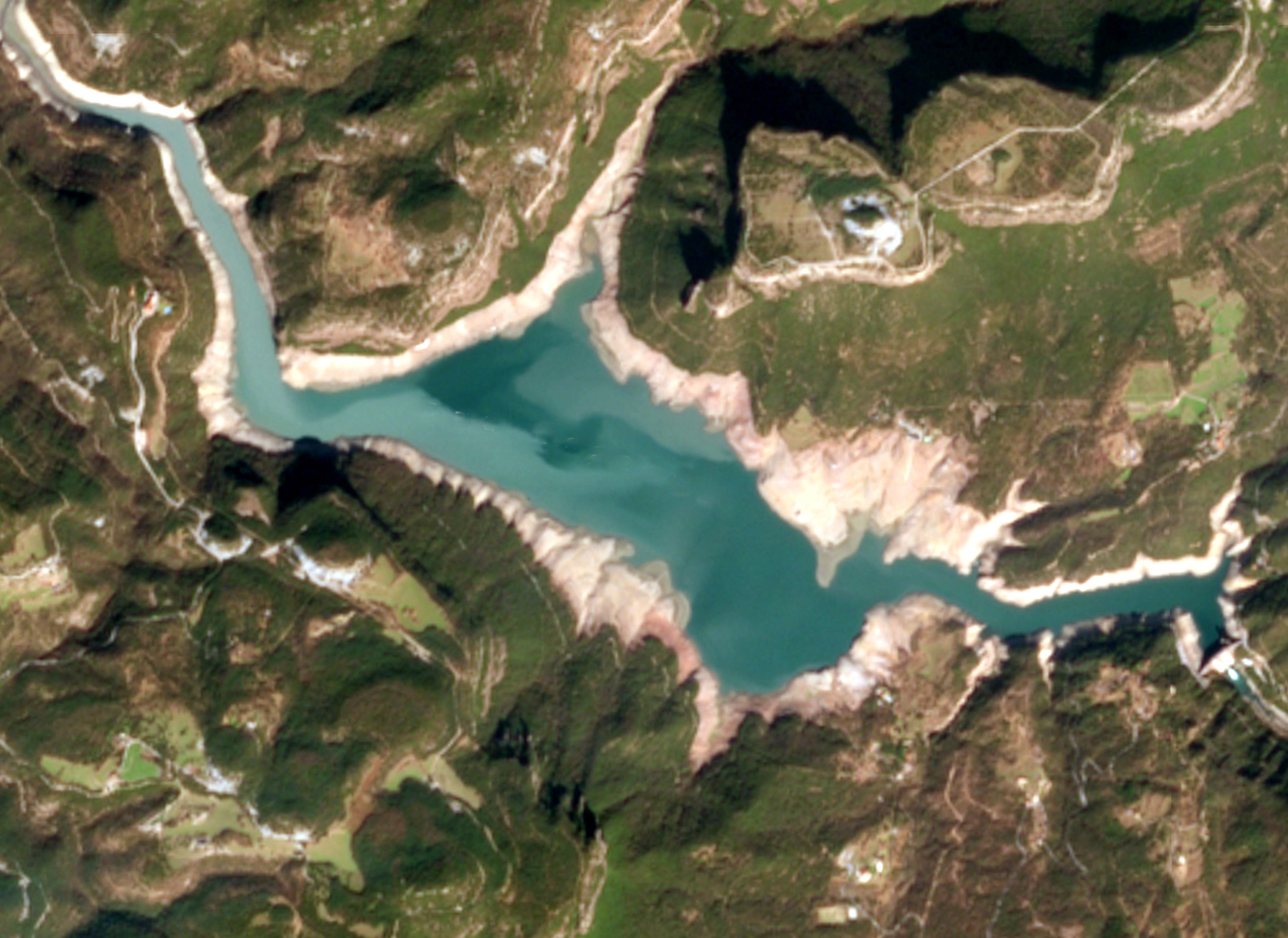
- A Sentinel-2 satellite image of the reservoir.

- Location of Pantà de Sau
- Official name: Pantà de Sau
- Country: Spain
- Location: Vilanova de Sau, Catalonia
- Coordinates: 41°58′5″N 2°24′47″E
- Status: Operational
- Opening date: 1962

Dam and spillways
- Type of dam: Gravity dam
- Impounds: Ter
- Height: 83 m (272 ft)
- Length: 260 m (850 ft)

Reservoir
- Total capacity: 151.3 hm³
- Catchment area: 1522 km²
- Surface area: 572.8 ha

Sau Reservoir (Catalan: Pantà de Sau; IPA: [pənˈta ðə ˈsaw]) is a reservoir located on the Ter river, near Vilanova de Sau, Catalonia, Spain. The dam was completed in 1962, creating a reservoir with a storage capacity of 151.3 hm³ that covered the former town of Sant Romà de Sau. The Church of Sant Romà is still visible when the water level is low. The dam has a structural height of 83 m and a crest length of 260 m.

== See also ==
- List of dams and reservoirs in Catalonia
