= Cela =

Cela may refer to:

== People ==
- Cela (surname), a Spanish-Galician surname
- Çela, an Albanian surname
- Camilo José Cela, Spanish writer, winner of 1989 Nobel Prize in Literature
- Ćela, nickname of Stevan Nedić (1875–1923), Serbian Chetnik commander in Old Serbia and Macedonia

== Placenames and jurisdictions ==
=== Spain ===
- Balsa de Cela, a natural thermal spring in Lúcar, Almería
- Cela, Cambre, a parish in A Coruña
- Cela, León, a locality in León
- Cela, O Corgo, a parish in Lugo
- Cela, Outeiro de Rei, a parish in Lugo

=== Portugal ===
- Cela, Alcobaça, a parish in the Leiria district
- Cela, Chaves, a parish in the municipality of Chaves

=== Other ===
- Cela, Angola, a municipality in the Cuanza-Sul province
- Cella Dati, known as Céla in the Cremunés dialect, a municipality in Cremona, Italy
- Coela, also known as Cela, a Roman city and diocese, now a Latin Catholic titular see
- Ekinözü, known as Cela in Kurdish, a town and district in Turkey

== Biology ==
- CELA1, an enzyme that in humans is encoded by the CELA1 gene
- CELA2A, an enzyme that in humans is encoded by the CELA2A gene
- CELA2B, an enzyme that in humans is encoded by the CELA2B gene
- CELA3A, an enzyme that in humans is encoded by the CELA3A gene
- CELA3B, an enzyme that in humans is encoded by the CELA3B gene

== Other uses ==
- cela, a French demonstrative pronoun
- Cela Sculptoris, commonly known as Caelum, a faint constellation in the southern sky
- Tropical Cyclone Cela, a tropical cyclone which moved across Madagascar in December 2003; see 2003–04 South-West Indian Ocean cyclone season
- Canadian Environmental Law Association, non-profit, public interest organization
- Centro de Estudios Latinoamericanos, National Autonomous University of Mexico
- A character in the film The Big Brass Ring
- A character in the video game Unison: Rebels of Rhythm & Dance
- CELA, an American professional designation for Council of Educators in Landscape Architecture

== See also ==
- Isabel Celaá
- Cella (disambiguation)
- Cala (disambiguation)
- Sela (disambiguation)
