= Cella (disambiguation) =

Cella is the inner chamber in a temple.

Cella may also refer to:

== People ==
- Cella (surname)
- Cella Delavrancea (1887–1991), Romanian pianist, writer, and teacher of piano
- Cella Serghi (1907–1992), Romanian prose writer

== Places ==
=== Burkina Faso ===
- Cella, Burkina Faso
- Cella De Loanga, Burkina Faso

=== Italy ===
- Cella Dati, Italy
- Cella Monte, Italy

=== Other places ===
- Cella, Aragon, Spain
- Cella, the Hungarian name for Ţela village, Bata Commune, Arad County, Romania

== Other uses ==
- Cella's, a brand of chocolate-covered cherries

== See also ==
- Cela (disambiguation)
- Sella (disambiguation)
