= Cellario =

Cellario is a surname. Notable people with the surname include:

- Francesco Cellario (1520–1569), Italian Protestant pastor
- Patrice Cellario (born 1953), Monegasque Interior Minister

== See also ==
- Cella (surname)
