= Louisiana floods =

Louisiana floods may refer to several events throughout Louisiana history:

- Great Mississippi Flood of 1927 - The worst river flood in U.S. history caused damage in Louisiana along with other states
- Mississippi flood of 1973 - Affected areas around the Mississippi River in Louisiana and other states
- May 1995 Louisiana flood - Much of New Orleans flooded after heavy rainfall across South Louisiana
- 2005 levee failures in Greater New Orleans - After Hurricane Katrina many levees failed in New Orleans causing widespread catastrophic flooding in 80% of the city
- 2011 Mississippi River floods - Severe flooding across the Mississippi River Valley affected Louisiana
- 2015 Louisiana floods - The Red River reached record levels, resulting in flooding
- 2016 Louisiana floods - Prolonged rainfall across South Louisiana caused catastrophic flooding resulting in over 146,000 flooded homes and 13 deaths
