= Ramsey Green =

Government Official

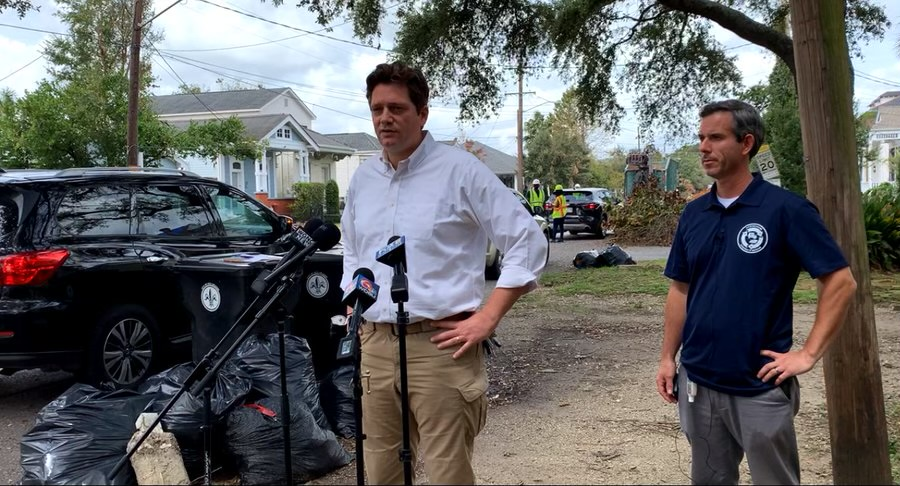
Green addressing media following Hurricane Ida

Ramsey Green is an American former local and state government official from Louisiana who served as chief of infrastructure for the City of New Orleans during the COVID-19 pandemic, Hurricane Ida, continuing problems with drainage in New Orleans, the city's response to climate change, and oversaw the rebuilding of the New Orleans public school system following Hurricane Katrina.

== Work ==
Green began his government career in Louisiana in 2006–7, when he became the education policy director for the Louisiana Recovery Authority, which guided the state's recovery from hurricanes Katrina and Rita. In 2007, Green was appointed by Louisiana Recovery School District (RSD) Superintendent Paul Vallas to serve as the RSD's Budget Director and then as Deputy Superintendent for Operations. The RSD, a special statewide school district established and administered by the Louisiana Department of Education, oversaw the recovery of New Orleans public schools in Hurricane Katrina's aftermath. Green served in this role from 2007 to 2012. As operations chief, Green directed the management and oversight of the reconstruction of New Orleans's public-school infrastructure, including capital facilities, finances, and general district operations, and led the RSD team that negotiated an unprecedented settlement with FEMA, bringing nearly $2 billion to rebuild the city's public schools. The RSD project was the largest school construction program in the City since the Civil War.

In 2018, newly elected Mayor LaToya Cantrell appointed Green as Deputy Chief Administrative Officer for Infrastructure and Operations and Chief Resilience Officer to oversee improvements to New Orleans’ infrastructure, including coastal restoration. The city's $2 billion post-Katrina FEMA-funded joint infrastructure program with the Sewerage and Water Board of New Orleans had been stalled for years, with less than $10 million in construction projects underway. Green led the acceleration of the rebuilding program, leading to more than $650 million in annual infrastructure spending.

In 2019, New Orleans voters approved more than $500M in public infrastructure bonds, which increased the total funds for infrastructure improvements to the city to more than $2.3 billion. With climate change driven drainage challenges and flooding occurring more regularly in many New Orleans neighborhoods, Green and city officials prioritized creating stormwater retention greenspaces to prevent flooding from heavy rain events. Under Green, the city completed, among others, the FEMA-funded Pontilly neighborhood stormwater network project, which is capable of holding up to nine million gallons of water and reducing flooding by 14 inches.

Green's tenure in city government overlapped with a series of crises. In October 2019, the Hard Rock Hotel collapsed and Green played a leadership role in the city's response. Hurricane Ida, the second most powerful and damaging storm to ever land in Louisiana, hit New Orleans on August 29, 2021. Green oversaw the city's storm recovery, and provided updates to residents and the media regarding restoring the power grid, debris removal, trash pickup. With the city's sanitation services crippled due to Hurricane Ida and labor shortages, Green appealed to FEMA for assistance and secured $20 million in funds for emergency trash contracts.

Green left city government in May 2022, and lives in New Orleans with his wife and children.
