= Sella =

Sella may refer to:

== Places ==
- Sella, Alicante, a municipality in Spain
- Sella, Greece, a village in Greece
- Sella group, mountains in the Dolomites
- Sella River (Bay of Biscay), Asturias, Spain
- Sella River (Guam)

== Other uses ==
- Sella (surname)
- Sella (grape), or Peloursin, a French wine grape
- Sella-class destroyer, a type of ship used by the Italian navy
- Sella Italiano, a horse breed
- Sella turcica, a depression in the human skull
- Sella, an anatomical term referring to part of the noseleaf of horseshoe bats
- Sella, a variety of parboiled rice
- Sella, a character in Fate/stay night
- sella curulis (Latin), the curule chair of ancient Rome

== See also ==
- Sela (disambiguation)
- Selah (disambiguation)
