= Çela =

Other names
- Variant form: Çelaj

Çela is an Albanian surname. According to an article by Paskal Milo, the surname could possibly be of pagan origin. It is today the fourth most common surname in Albania.

Notable people with the surname include:

- Emiliano Çela (born 1985), Albanian footballer
- Gentian Çela (born 1981), Albanian footballer
- Isuf Çela (born 1996), Albanian footballer
- Joan Çela (born 2000), Albanian footballer
- Klaidi Cela (born 1999), Canadian soccer player
