= Isuf Çela =

Albanian footballer

Personal information
- Date of birth: 18 September 1996 (age 30)
- Place of birth: Elbasan, Albania
- Position: Midfielder

Youth career
- –2014: Prato

Senior career*
| Years | Team | Apps | (Gls) |
| 2014–2016 | Prato | 8 | (0) |
| 2014–2015 | → Bologna Youth (loan) | | |
| 2016–2017 | Poggibonsi | | |
| 2017–2018 | San Donato | | |

International career^{‡}
| 2014 | Albania U19 | 0 | (0) |
- * Club domestic league appearances and goals as of 6 April 2016 ‡ National team caps and goals as of 22 July 2014

Isuf Çela (born 18 September 1996, in Elbasan) is an Albanian former professional footballer who last played as a midfielder for Italian club San Donato.

== Career ==
He gained entry at the first team of A.C. Prato in the 2013–14 season as he called up by the coach Vincenzo Esposito to participate in the opening match against L'Aquila on 1 September 2013. In this match Çela was an unused substitute for the entire match. He made it his debut three weeks later on 22 September 2013 against Gubbio coming on as a substitute in the 89th minute in place of Matteo Serrotti and the match finished as a goalless draw. He finished the first half of the season with a total of 5 matches played then was loaned out to Bologna F.C. 1909 during the January 2014.

== Career statistics ==
=== Club ===
As of 15 December 2013

| Season | Club | League country | League | | League Cup | | Europe | | Total | |
| Season | Club | League country | Apps | Goals | Apps | Goals | Apps | Goals | Apps | Goals |
|---|---|---|---|---|---|---|---|---|---|---|
| 2013–14 | Prato | Lega Pro Prima Divisione | 5 | 0 | 0 | 0 | – | – | 5 | 0 |
| Total | | | 5 | 0 | 0 | 0 | 0 | 0 | 5 | 0 |
| Career total | | | 5 | 0 | 0 | 0 | 0 | 0 | 5 | 0 |
