= Cela (surname) =

Cela is a Spanish-Galician surname. Notable people with the surname include:

- Alfonso Cela (1885–1932), Spanish bullfighter
- Camilo José Cela (1916–2002), Spanish Nobel Prize winning writer
- Camilo José Cela Conde (born 1946), Spanish writer and professor of philosophy, son of the former
- Gabriel Hernán Cela (born 1974), Argentine footballer
- Izolda Cela (born 1960), Brazilian professor, psychologist and politician
- José María Cela (born 1969), Spanish footballer and academic
- Paloma Cela (1946–2019), Spanish actress and model
- Pedro Pardo de Cela (1425–1483), Marshal of Galicia, beheaded by order of the Catholic Monarchs
- Violeta Cela (born 1960), Spanish actress

== See also ==
- Cella (surname)
- Sela (surname)
