= Guntín =

Coordinates: 42°53′16″N 7°41′50″W

- Municipality
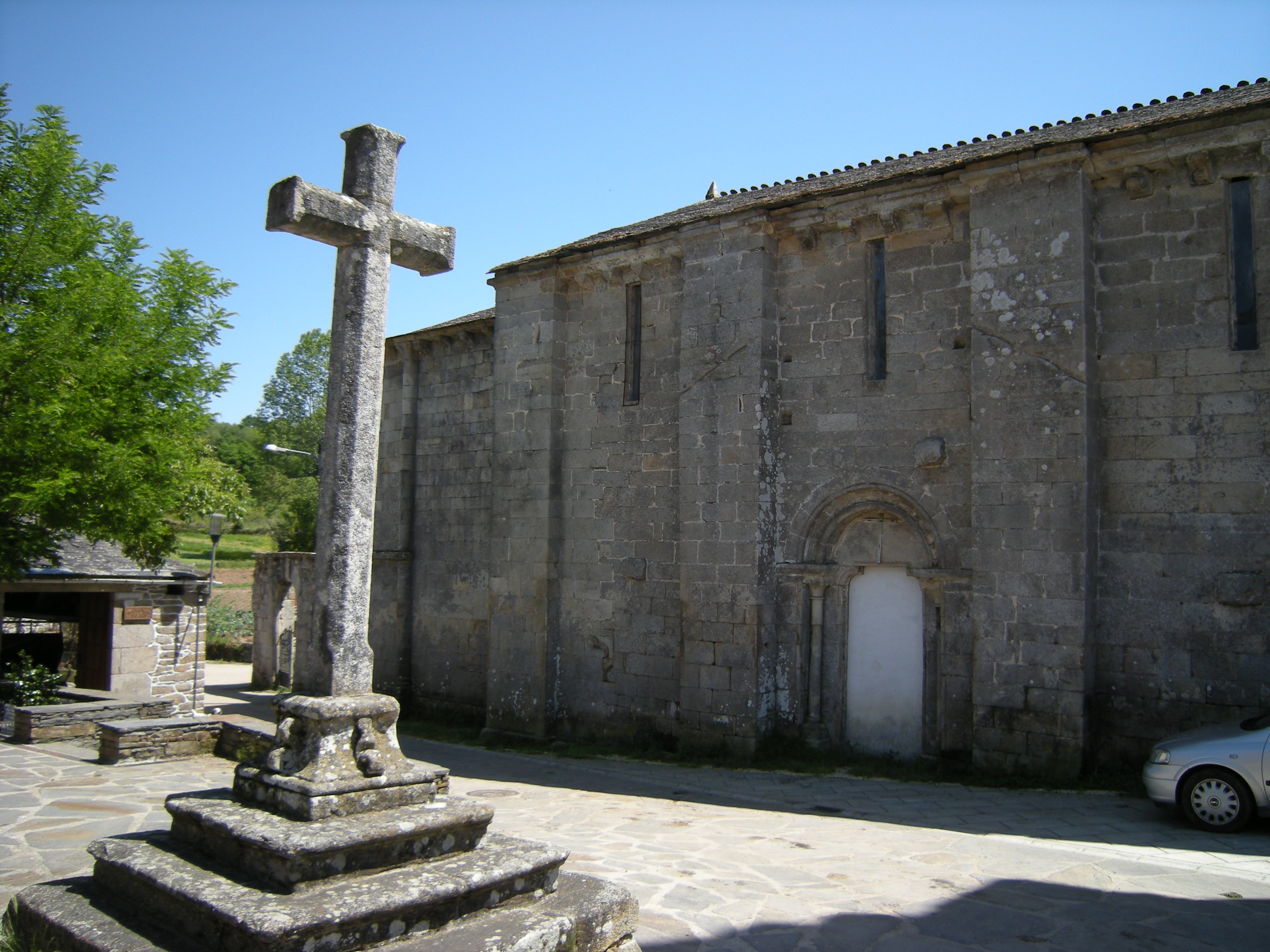
- Monastery of Santa María de Ferreira de Pallares.

- Coat of arms

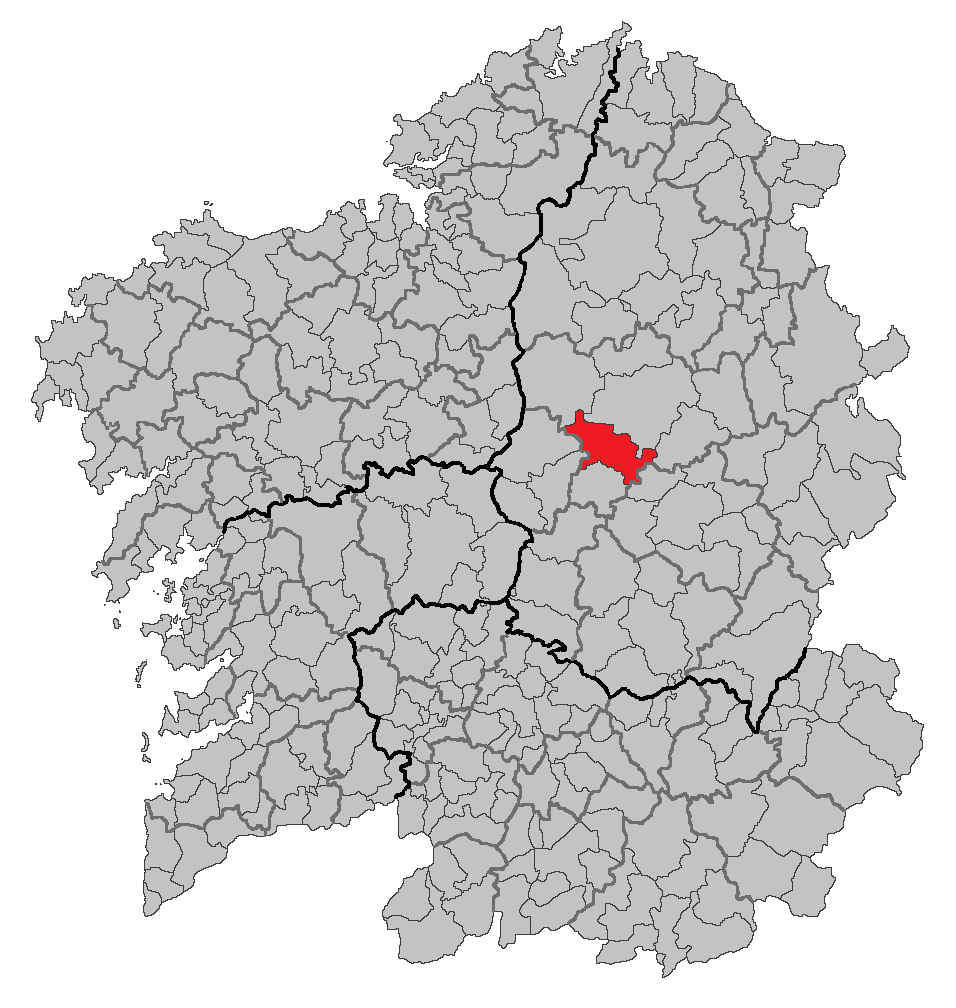
- Location of Guntín.

- Location in Spain
- Country: Spain
- Autonomous community: Galicia
- Province: Lugo
- Comarca: Lugo

Government
  - Alcalde: Ángel Pérez Rodríguez (PPdeG)

Area
  - Total: 154.78 km^{2} (59.76 sq mi)

Population
  - Total: 2,551
  - Density: 16.48/km^{2} (42.69/sq mi)
- Demonym(s): Guntinés, pallarego
- Time zone: UTC+1 (CET)
  - Summer (DST): UTC+2 (CEST)
- Postal code: 27023
- Website: Official website

Guntín (Galician pronunciation: [ɡunˈtiŋ]) is a municipality in the province of Lugo, in the autonomous community of Galicia, Spain. It belongs to the comarca of Lugo.

== History ==
Guntín was the former capital of the former jurisdiction of Terra de Pallares.
