= Gulf Intracoastal Waterway West Closure Complex =

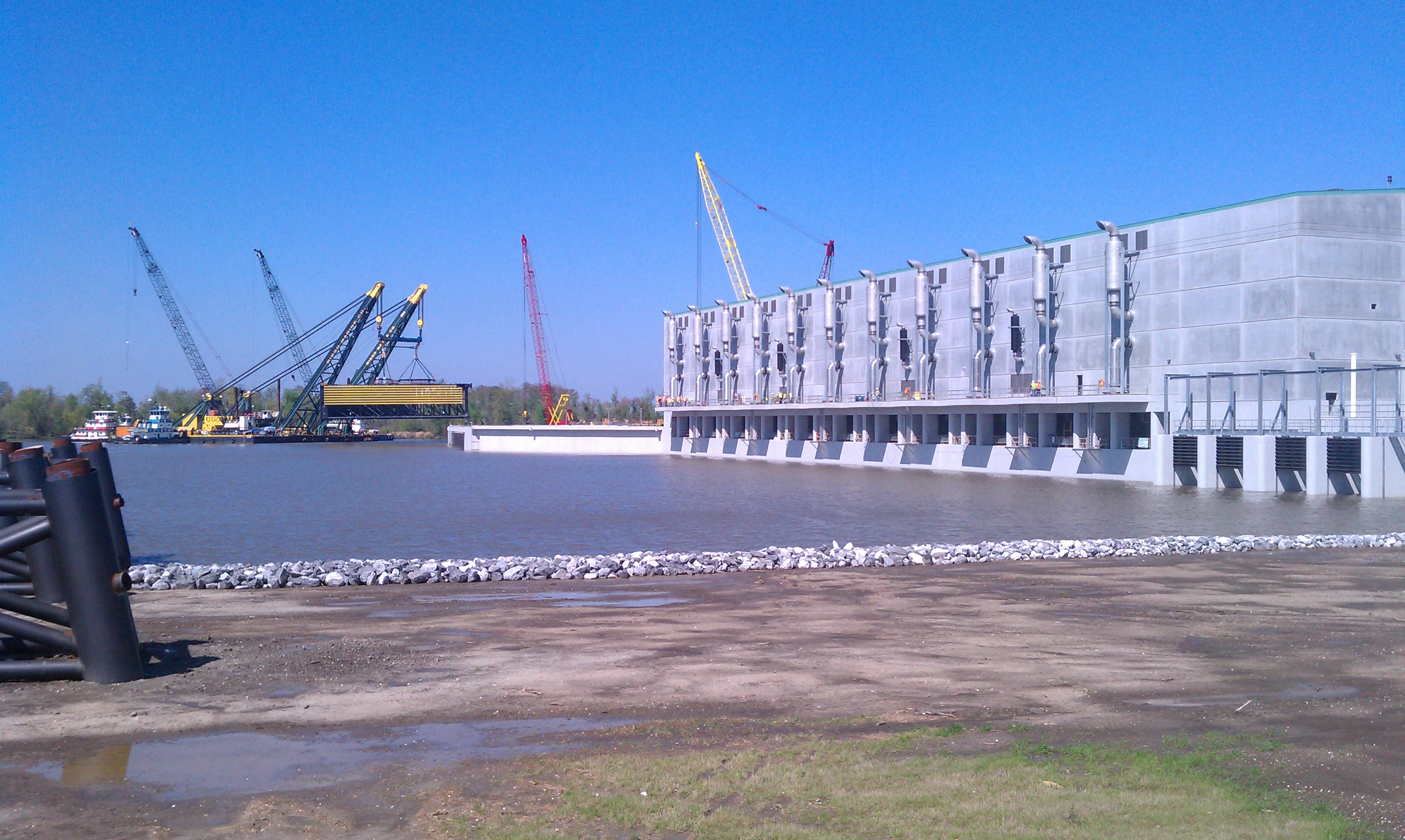
- Installation of a 653 ton Sector Gate Leaf at GIWW West Closure
- Coordinates: 29°48′56″N 90°04′06″W
- Crosses: Gulf Intracoastal Waterway
- Locale: Plaquemines Parish, Louisiana
- Owner: US Army Corps of Engineers

Characteristics
- Material: Concrete, steel

History
- Constructed by: Gulf IntraCoastal Constructors, a Joint Venture of Kiewit and Traylor Bros
- Construction start: August 2009
- Construction end: April 2014
- Construction cost: ~$1 Billion

Location
- Interactive map of Gulf Intracoastal Waterway West Closure Complex

The Gulf Intracoastal Waterway West Closure Complex is a part of the New Orleans Drainage System; it consists of a navigable floodgate, a pumping station, flood walls, sluice gates, foreshore protection, and an earthen levee. The complex was designed to reduce risk for residences and businesses in the project area from a storm surge associated with a tropical event, with an intensity that has a one percent chance of occurring in any given year. This project was operated for the first time on August 29, 2012, in response to Hurricane Isaac.

== Location ==
The project is located approximately one half mile south of the confluence of the Harvey and Algiers canals on the Gulf Intracoastal Waterway. The location is next to the Environmental Protection Agency's Bayou aux Carpes Clean Water Act (CWA) 404(c) area, a wetland area of national significance.

== Features ==
The GIWW West Closure Complex consists of a navigable floodgate, a pumping station, floodwalls, sluice gates, foreshore protection, and an earthen levee. The project also required the dredging of Algiers Canal, as well as the realignment of Bayou Road. Project challenges consist of maintaining navigation traffic on the GIWW (a Federal navigation channel with heavy commercial barge traffic) and the location of the complex in relationship to the Environmental Protection Agency’s Bayou aux Carpes Clean Water Act (CWA) 404(c) area, a wetland area of national significance.

- A 225 feet (69 m) navigable floodgate
- When the gate is closed during a storm event, the 194,251 cubic feet per second (5,500.6 cubic metres per second) 11 bay pump station is required to evacuate the rainwater that is pumped into the Harvey and Algiers canals by 9 other pump stations along the canals.
- The pump station complex, which is the largest of its type in the world, consists of 11 each 5,444 horsepower Caterpillar engines.
- To minimize environmental impacts to the Bayou aux Carpes 404(c) area, the floodwall was constructed on the eastern edge of the wetlands, within 100 feet (30 m) from the western bank of the GIWW for a 4,216 feet (1,285 m). The floodwall starts north of the pump station and gate structure with a water control structure across the Old Estelle Outfall Canal, and extends southward along the eastern edge of the Bayou aux Carpes 404(c) area. A canal closure wall connects the floodwall and navigable floodgate on the GIWW. A protective berm was constructed on the channel side of the floodwall to protect it from barge impacts. Foreshore protection was constructed along the GIWW, adjacent to, but not within, the Bayou aux Carpes CWA Section 404(c) area and along the new earthen levee to prevent impacts due to discharges from the pump station.
- A new earthen levee has been constructed east of the closure complex and ties into the existing levees.
- Bayou Road has been realigned to provide access around the new levee on the protected side.
- Dredging of the Algiers Canal has been competed from the Belle Chasse Tunnel south to the confluence of the Harvey and Algiers canals, a distance of approximately 4.8 miles (7.7 km). Approximately 700,000 cubic yards of material has been excavated from the Algiers Canal. Consequently, the dredged material was used beneficially in a marsh restoration project in the Jean Lafitte National Historical Park and Preserve (JLNHPP) or placed in borrow sites near Walker Road.

The GIWW West Closure Complex reduces the risk to a large area of the west bank by removing over 25 miles (40 km) of levees, floodwalls, a floodgate, and pumping stations along the Harvey and Algiers canals from the direct impacts of storm surge. The risk reduction surge barrier was completed by the 2011 Atlantic hurricane season with reduced pumping capacity. All project construction was completed in 2012.

== Status ==
Final approval of the Individual Environmental Report #12 for the GIWW West Closure Complex was completed on February 18, 2009. On May 28, 2009, the Environmental Protection Agency granted the US Army Corps of Engineers permission to modify the Bayou aux Carpes 1985 determination to allow for construction on the westernmost boundary of the wetland area. The Corps held a joint public hearing with the EPA to address all questions and concerns regarding the request for modification of the Bayou Aux Carpes 404(c) area.

On April 17, 2009, the Corps awarded the base portion of the Early Contractor Involvement (ECI) contract to Gulf Intracoastal Constructors for pile load testing and pre-construction services. The ECI contracting method (also known as Construction Management at Risk in private industry) allows the construction contractor to work hand-in-hand with the Corps and the design team on plan revisions and construction sequencing that will improve the constructability and cost-savings of the project. Several more construction options have been awarded since April. Construction of risk reduction features began on 6 August 2009.

On March 6 & 10, 2011, installation of the 653 ton ea. sector gates was completed.

The Notice of Construction Complete was issued on April 8, 2014.

== Sources ==
1. NOLA.com, Retrieved 2010-07-26
2. Engineering News Record Web Site, Retrieved 2010-07-26
3. US Army Corps of Engineers Web Site, Retrieved 2010-07-26
4. Pop Sci Web Site, Retrieved 2010-07-26
5. Southeast Louisiana Flood Protection Authority West Web Site, Retrieved 2010-07-26
