= Wood Screw Pump =

Low-lift axial-flow drainage pump

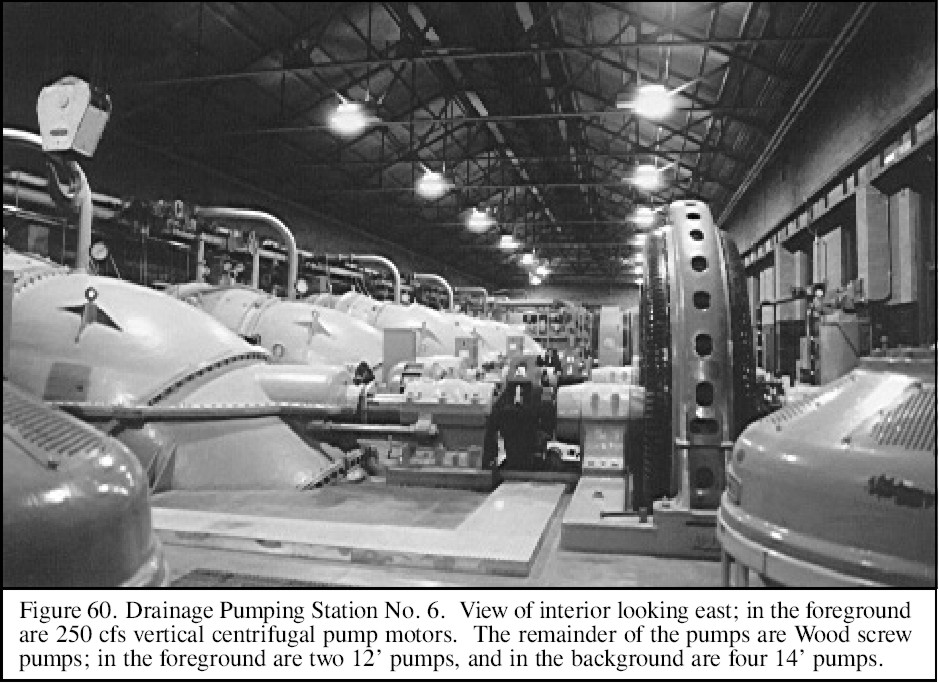
Drainage Pumping Station No. 6 in New Orleans

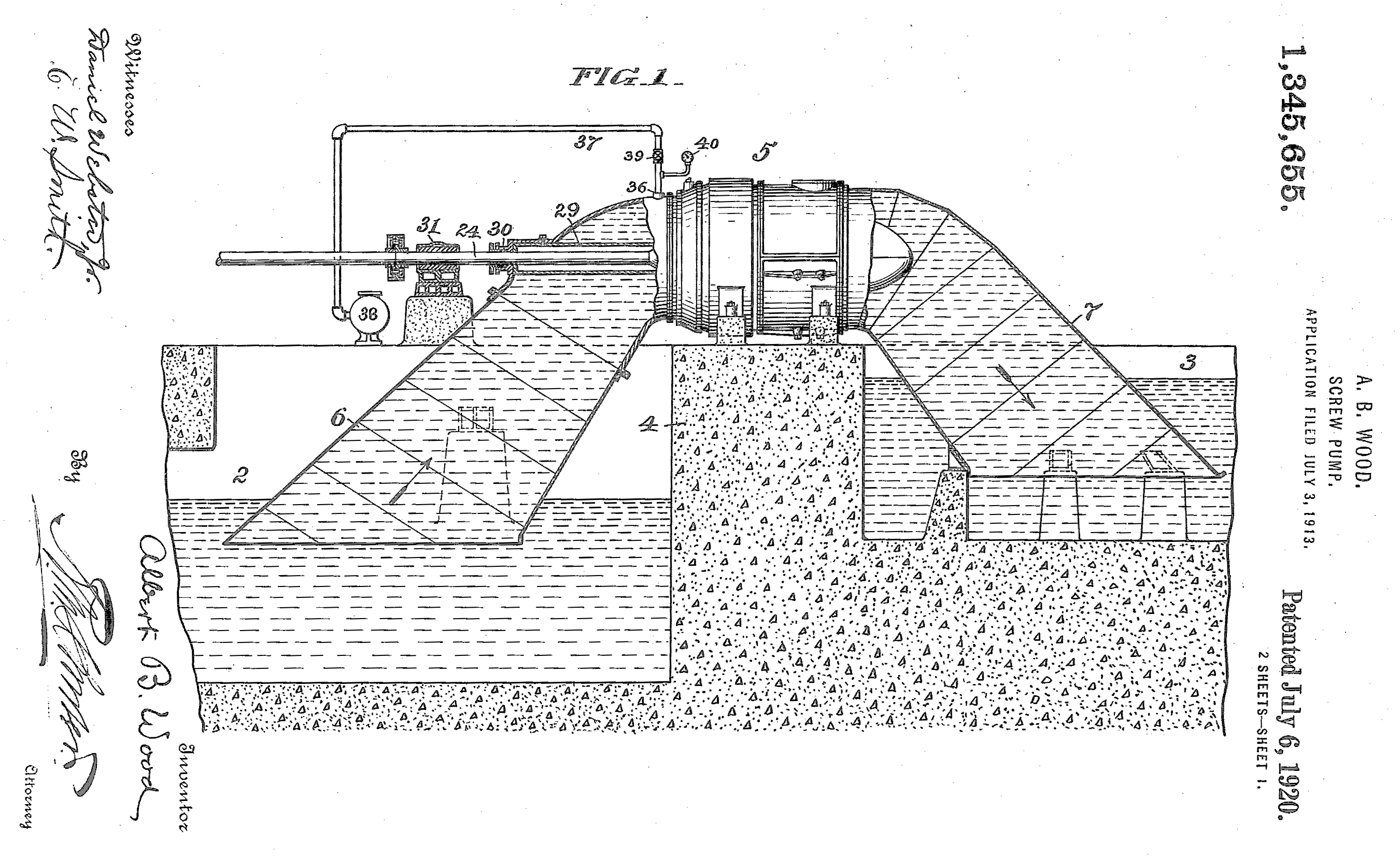
Patent diagram for Wood Screw Pump (page 1)

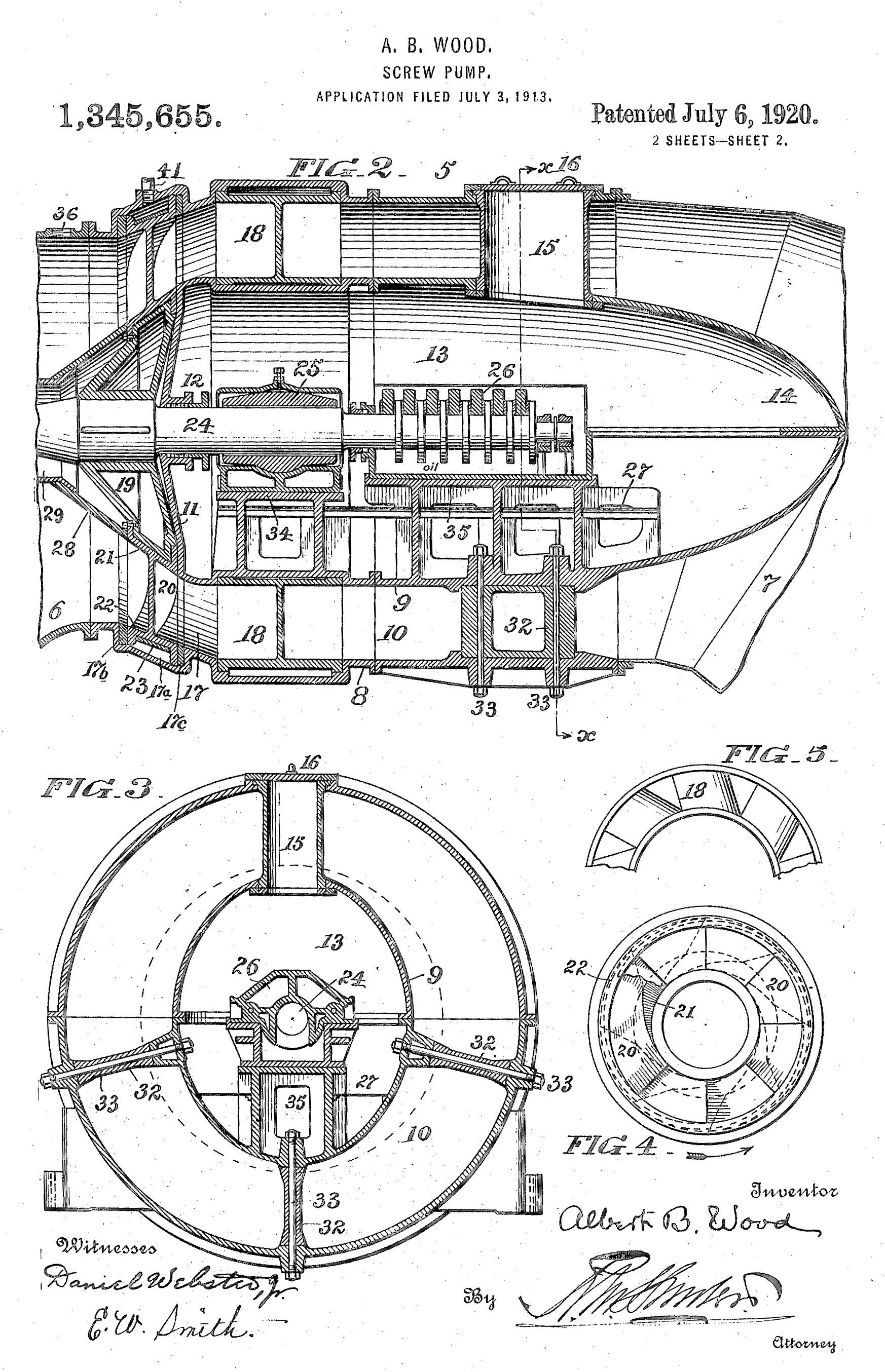
Patent diagram for Wood Screw Pump (page 2)

The Wood Screw Pump is a low-lift axial-flow drainage pump designed by A. Baldwin Wood in 1913 to cope with the drainage problems of New Orleans. Wood's extremely efficient pumps replaced less efficient pumps in the city's drainage system, prior to which the city had experienced chronic flooding problems, bringing diseases such as malaria and yellow fever along with contamination of drinking water supplies. The pumps are driven by 2,000 horsepower (1,500 kW) synchronous Allis-Chalmers and General Electric motors, built in the early 1900s. They were designed to lift a large volume of water into outfall canals that flowed into Lake Pontchartrain.

Having proved their operational efficiency in New Orleans, officials around the world wanted Wood to make pumps for them, especially those in the Netherlands. Wood rejected all requests as he refused to leave Louisiana. Until the arrival of Hurricane Katrina, the pumps had kept much of New Orleans from experiencing major inundation for nearly 100 years. These pumps played a crucial role in protecting New Orleans from flooding for almost a century.
