= Lugo (comarca) =

Coordinates: 43°01′00″N 7°36′00″W

- Comarca
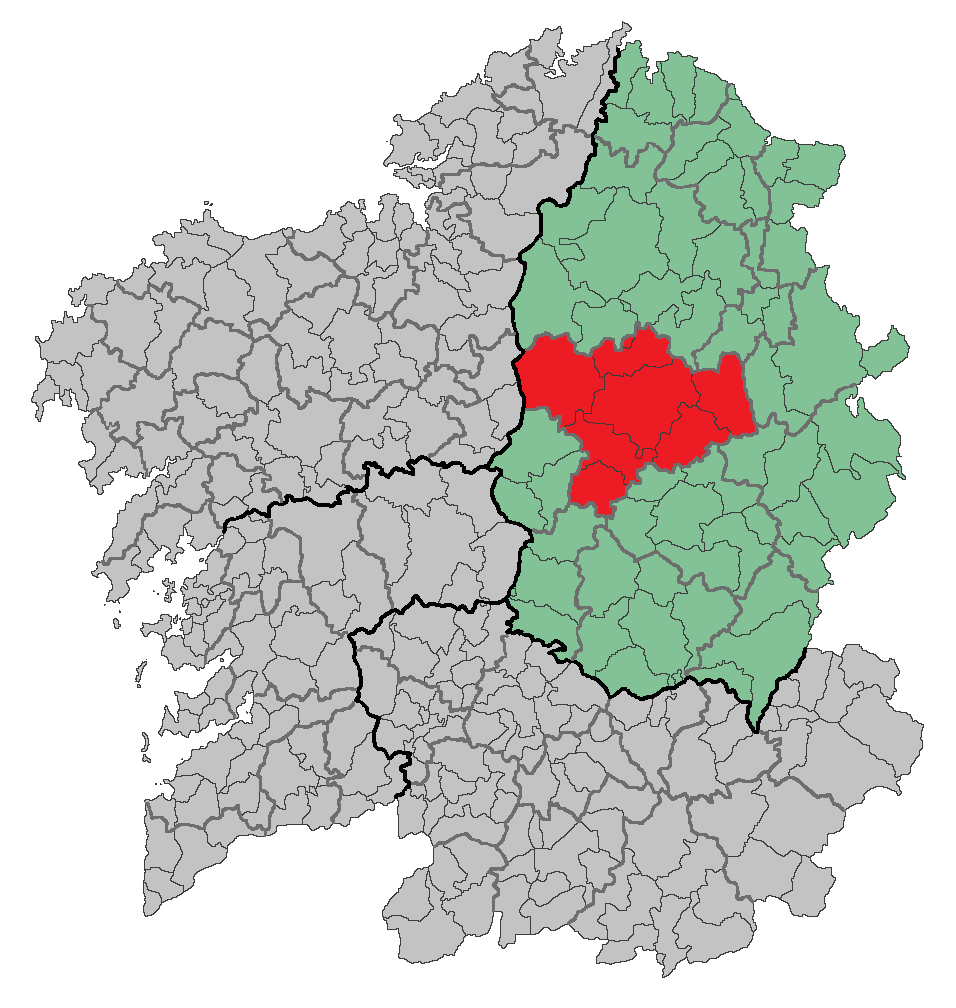
- Country: Spain
- Autonomous community: Galicia
- Province: Lugo
- Capital: Lugo
- Municipalities: List: Castroverde, O Corgo, Friol, Guntín, Lugo, Outeiro de Rei, Portomarín, Rábade
- Time zone: UTC+1 (CET)
  - Summer (DST): UTC+2 (CEST)

Lugo is a comarca in the Galician province of Lugo. It had a population of 118,931 as of 2019.

== Municipalities ==
Castroverde, O Corgo, Friol, Guntín, Lugo, Outeiro de Rei, Portomarín and Rábade.
