= Friol =

Begonte
- Municipality
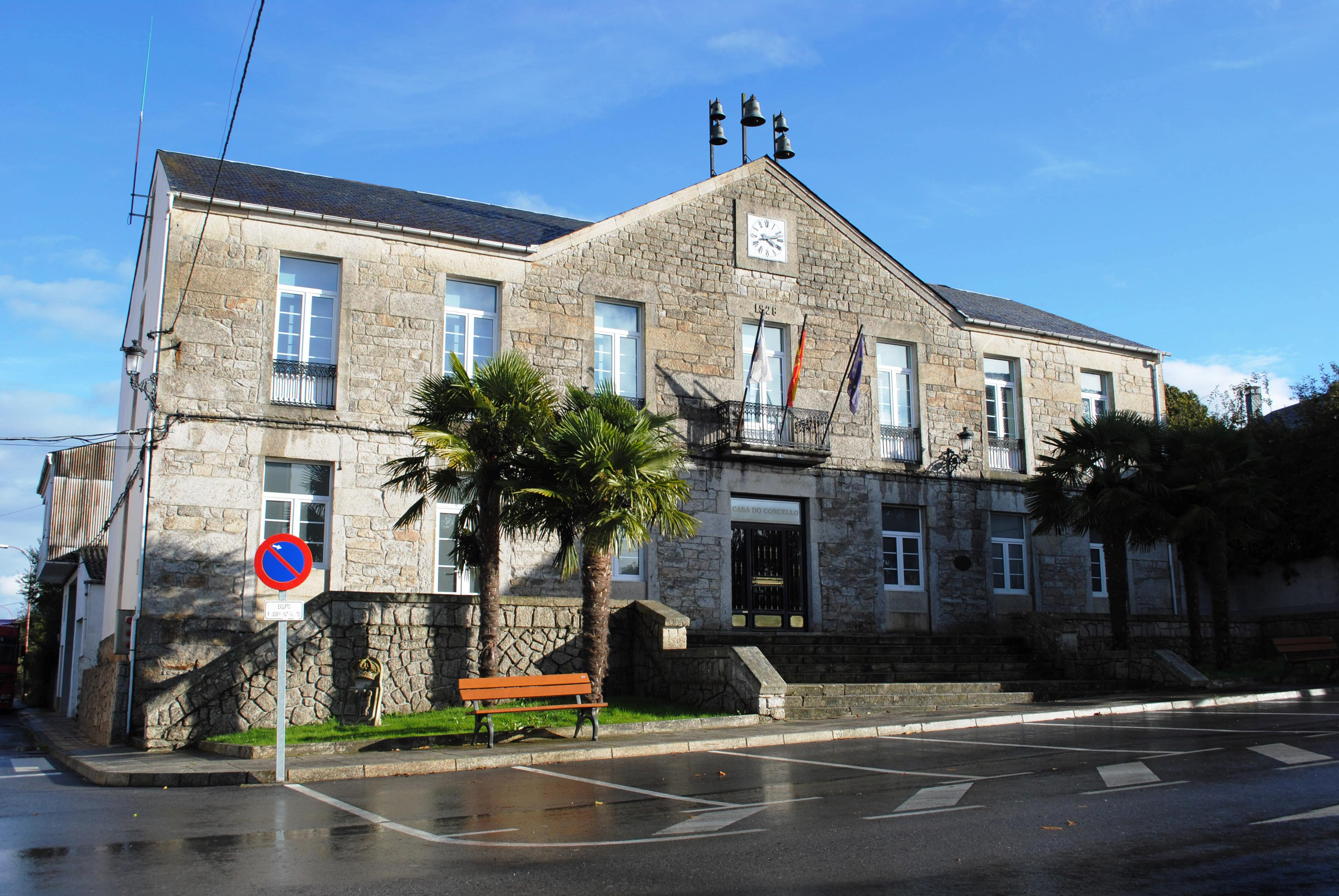
- Town hall of Friol.

- Coat of arms

- A map of Friol and its parroquias.

- Location in Spain Begonte (Galicia)
- Coordinates: 43°02′N 7°47′W
- Country: Spain
- Autonomous community: Galicia
- Province: Lugo
- Comarca: Lugo

Government
  - Alcalde: José Ángel Santos (People's Party)

Area
  - Total: 292.29 km^{2} (112.85 sq mi)

Population (2024)
  - Total: 3,616
  - Density: 12.37/km^{2} (32.04/sq mi)
- Demonym: Friolés/a
- Time zone: UTC+1 (CET)
  - Summer (DST): UTC+2 (CEST)
- Postal code: 27...
- Website: www.concellodefriol.es/index.html

Friol is a municipality in the Lugo province in Galicia. It is located in northwest Spain. It is bordered on the north by Begonte and Guitiriz, to the south by Palas de Rei and Guntín, to the east by Lugo and Outeiro de Rei and to the west by the province of La Coruña. It has an area of 292.29 km^{2}. It has a population of 3,616 inhabitants according to the INE in 2024. The population density is 12 inhabitants/km^{2}.

== History ==
In Friol, there are still vestigial megaliths, the oldest preserved in this municipality. This area was occupied by Romans and Visigoths.

In the Middle Ages the families Ulloa, Parga and Seixas shared power in this term. Proof of this are the buildings, towers and castles inhabiting the territory. The most famous building is the fortress of Friol San Paio of Narla, of unknown origin and rebuilt in the sixteenth century by Don Vasco Seixas, lord of the Solar House and Castro Seixas and Pazo de San Paio of Narla. He was the son of Don Basque Seixas "el viejo" and Maria Alvarez de Sotomayor and grandson of Don Vasco Seixas, who in the fourteenth century was lord of San Paio, Osera, Chantada, Ferreira, Samos, Sobrado and Eire. He participated in the dynastic struggle of Trastámara in favor of Don Henry. In Friol there are many popular legends related to the fortress of San Paio of Narla and its owners Vazquez de Seixas. This same lineage also belonged to the Pazo do Monte, located in the same area.
