= Matteo Serrotti =

Italian footballer, midfielder

Personal information
- Date of birth: 1 November 1986 (age 40)
- Place of birth: Florence, Italy
- Height: 1.75 m (5 ft 9 in)
- Position: Midfielder

Team information
- Current team: Athletic Carpi

Youth career
- 2007–2008: Pontassieve

Senior career*
Years	Team	Apps	(Gls)
2006–2010	Scandicci	86	(18)
2010–2011	Perugia	18	(1)
2011–2012	Pierantonio	32	(4)
2012–2013	Virtus Pavullese	32	(10)
2013–2014	Prato	28	(2)
2014–2015	Tuttocuoio	24	(1)
2015–2016	Prato	29	(0)
2016–2017	Correggese	25	(1)
2018	Scandicci	12	(3)
2018–2019	Arezzo	40	(3)
2019–2020	Siena	26	(0)
2020	Reggiana	2	(0)
2021	Arezzo	8	(0)
2021–	Athletic Carpi	9	(2)
- * Club domestic league appearances and goals as of 7 November 2021

Matteo Serrotti (born 1 November 1986) is an Italian footballer who plays as a midfielder for Athletic Carpi.

== Club career ==
Serrotti made his professional, Lega Pro debut in the Prato in the first round of 2013–14 Lega Pro, on 1 September 2013 against L'Aquila, playing 90 minutes. He signed to Arezzo in 2018.

On 5 July 2019, he signed with Siena.

On 31 January 2020, he joined Reggio Audace on a 1.5-year contract. However, his contract was terminated in October 2020.

On 4 January 2021, he returned to Arezzo.

On 15 September 2021, he joined Athletic Carpi in Serie D.
