= Sela =

Sela may refer to:

== People ==
=== Surname ===
- Avraham Sela (born 1950), Israeli political scientist
- Dudi Sela (born 1985), Israeli tennis player
- Jonas Sela (born 1984), German footballer
- Jonathan Sela (born 1978), French-born Israeli cinematographer
- Lhasa de Sela (1972–2010), American singer
- Luke Sela (1943–2007), Papua New Guinea journalist
- Michael Sela (1924–2022), Israeli immunologist; President of the Weizmann Institute of Science
- Yoel Sela (born 1951), Israeli Olympic competitive sailor
- Zlil Sela, Israeli mathematician

=== Given name ===
- Sela Molisa (born 1952), Vanuatu politician
- Sela Ward (born 1956), American actress
- Sela Guia (born 2000), Filipina Actress and Singer

== Places ==
- Sela, Kalinovik, Bosnia and Herzegovina
- Sela, Croatia
- Sela, historical name of Sela Bosiljevska, Croatia
- Sela, Eritrea
- Selá (Vopnafjörður), a river of Iceland
- Sela Pass, India
- Sela, Highland Papua
- Sela (Edom), Jordan
- Sela, Bijelo Polje, Montenegro
- Sela, Trøndelag, Norway
- Sela (Saudi Arabia), a mountain
- Sela, Osilnica, Slovenia
- Selaa, Lebanon

== Other uses ==
- Latin American Economic System (Spanish: Sistema Económico Latinoamericano)
- Southeast Louisiana Urban Flood Control Project
- Sela (Star Trek), a fictional character in the television series Star Trek
- "Se La", a song by Lionel Richie
- SELA (Hebrew: סל"ה), Hebrew abbreviation for "Students before Parents", an Israeli immigration program for Jewish youth
- Sela (company), a Saudi Arabian sporting and entertainment company

== See also ==
- Selo (disambiguation)
- Sella (disambiguation)
- Selah (disambiguation)
- Nova Sela (disambiguation)
