= Sella (surname) =

Sella is a surname. Notable people with the surname include:

- Andrea Sella (born 1961), Italian chemist
- Aviem Sella (born 1946), Israeli fighter pilot
- Brian Sella, singer - songwriter for the band The Front Bottoms
- Elis Sella (1930–1992), Finnish actor
- Emanuele Sella (born 1981), Italian road-racing cyclist
- Ezio Sella (born 1956), Italian football coach and former player
- Gabriele Sella (1963–2010), Italian cyclist at the 1984 Olympics in the sprint event
- Gev Sella, Israeli off-road motorcyclist
- Philippe Sella, French Rugby Union player
- Quintino Sella (1827–1884, Italian statesman
- Seela Sella (1936–2026), Finnish actress
- Vittorio Sella (1859–1943), Italian mountaineer and photographer
- Brian Sella, lead singer of American Folk-Punk band The Front Bottoms
