= Joan Çela =

Albanian footballer

Personal information
- Date of birth: 6 January 2000 (age 26)
- Place of birth: Albania
- Height: 1.75 m (5 ft 9 in)
- Position: Winger

Team information
- Current team: Kastrioti Krujë
- Number: 45

Youth career
- –2019: Partizani Tirana

Senior career*
Years	Team	Apps	(Gls)
2019	Partizani Tirana	1	(0)
2019–2020	Luftëtari Gjirokastër	20	(2)
2020	Skënderbeu Korçë	6	(0)
2021–	Kastrioti Krujë	70	(5)
- * Club domestic league appearances and goals as of 1 June 2024

Joan Çela (born 6 January 2000) is an Albanian footballer who plays as a winger for Kastrioti Krujë.

== Career ==
=== Partizani Tirana ===
A graduate of the club's youth academy, Çela made his Albanian Superliga debut on 30 May 2019, coming on as a 34th-minute substitute for Jasir Asani in a 1–1 away draw with Luftëtari.

== Honours ==
Partizani Tirana

- Albanian Superliga: 2018–19
