= O Corgo =

Coordinates: 42°57′00″N 7°25′00″W

- Municipality
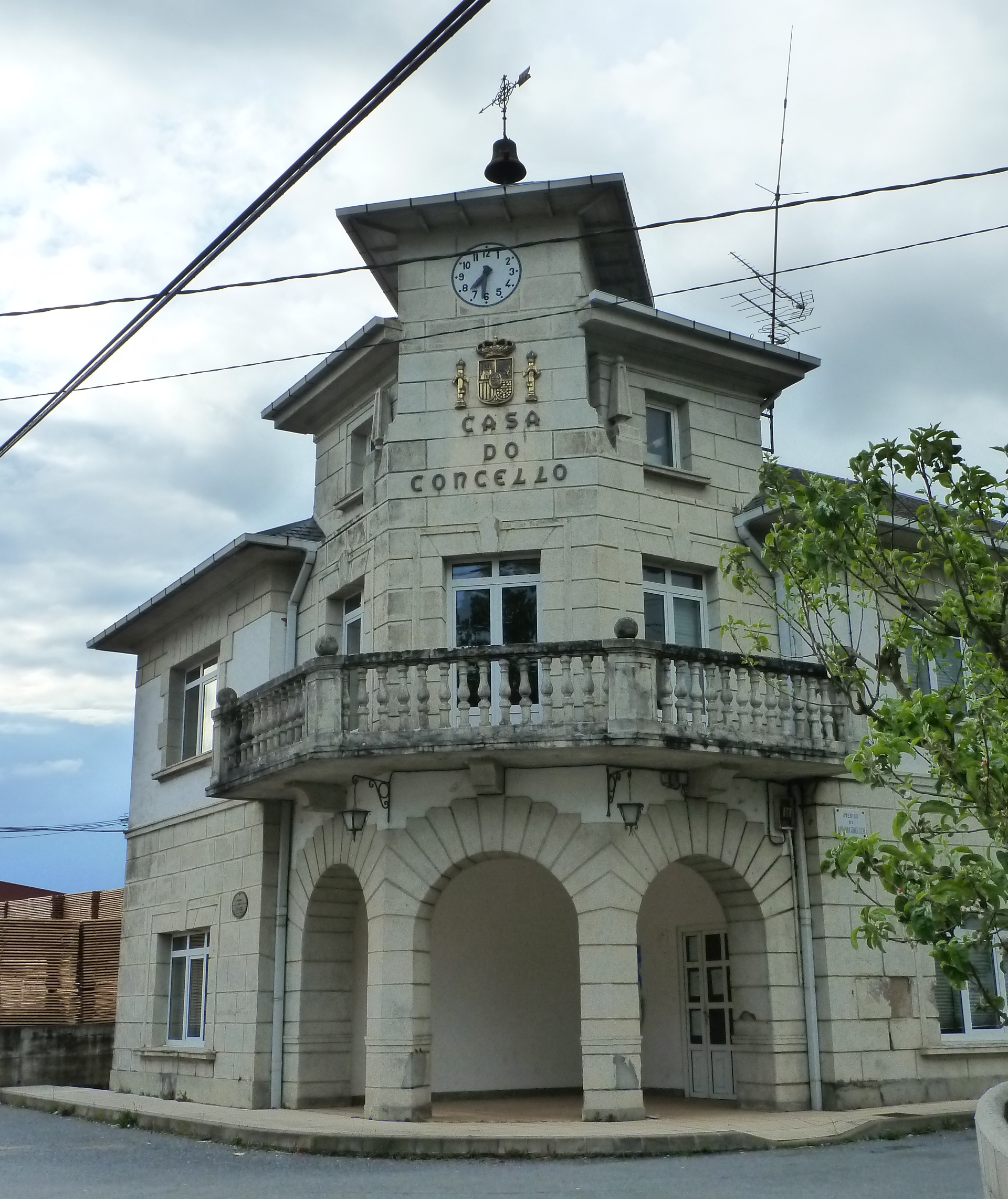
- Town hall.

- Coat of arms

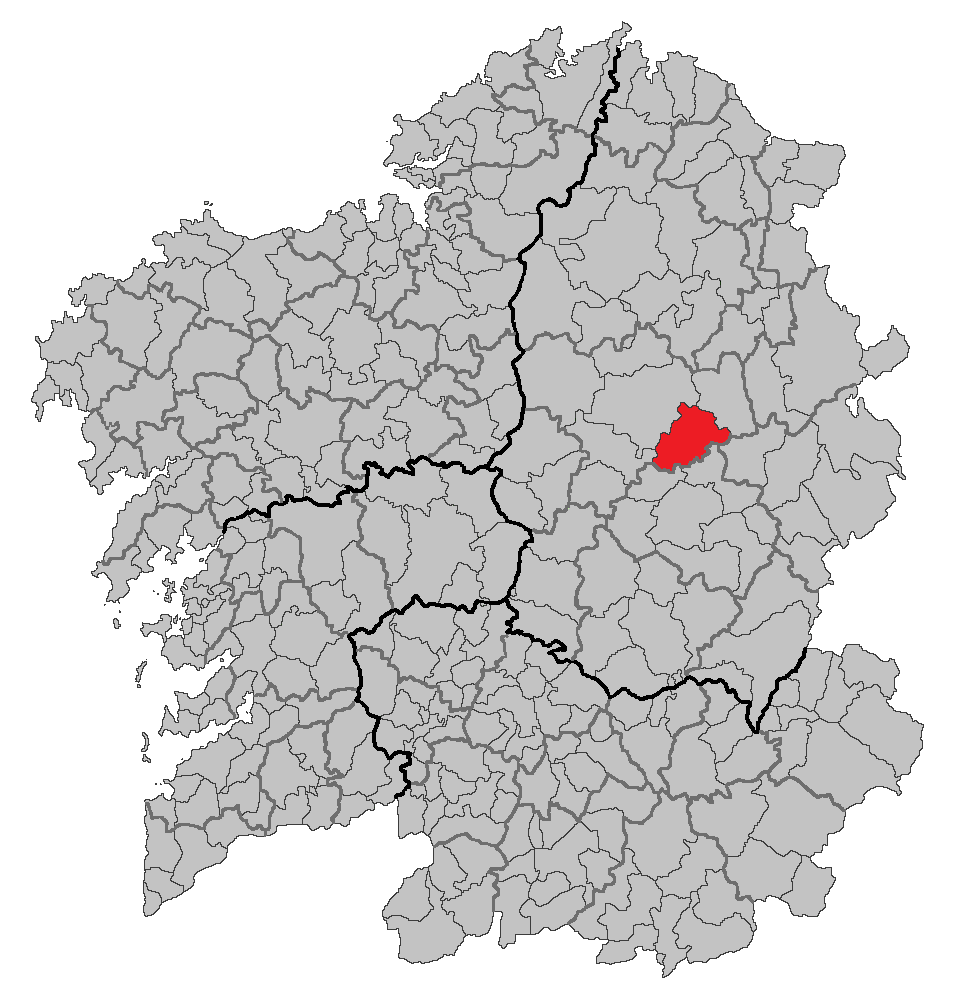
- Location of O Corgo

- Location in Spain
- Country: Spain
- Autonomous community: Galicia
- Province: Lugo
- Comarca: Lugo

Government
  - Alcalde: Felipe Labrada Reija (PPdeG)

Area
  - Total: 157.39 km^{2} (60.77 sq mi)

Population (2023)
  - Total: 3,396
  - Density: 21.58/km^{2} (55.88/sq mi)
- Demonym: Corgués
- Time zone: UTC+1 (CET)
  - Summer (DST): UTC+2 (CEST)
- Postal code: 27163
- Website: Official website

O Corgo, is a municipality in the province of Lugo, in the autonomous community of Galicia, Spain. It belongs to the comarca of Lugo.

== Notable people ==
- Heli Rolando de Tella (1888–1962), military officer.
