= Southeast Louisiana Urban Flood Control Project =

New Orleans flood control project

The Southeast Louisiana Urban Flood Control Project (Southeast Louisiana Project, or SELA) is a flood control project by the US Army Corps of Engineers to protect the New Orleans district from flooding due to potential storms, hurricanes, or water surges. It was established in 1996.

== History ==
Most of New Orleans lies below sea level, and relies on levees to protect the city against flooding from Lake Pontchartrain to the north and flooding from the Mississippi River to the south. In May 1995, record flooding events resulted in seven deaths and $1 billion in damage. As a result, Congress authorized SELA to improve flood control and rainfall drainage systems in Jefferson, Orleans, and St. Tammany Parishes. The authorization was contained in Section 108 of the Energy and Water Development Appropriations Act for Fiscal Year 1996 and Section 533 of the Water Resources Development Act (WRDA) of 1996.

== Implementation ==
The project includes improvements to channels, canals, pump stations, and drainage lines, as well as the addition of a new pump station in Orleans Parish.

As of 2002, seven contracts in Orleans Parish were complete, two were underway, and one had yet to be awarded. Other contracts were scheduled for award but limited by insufficient funding.

== See also ==
- Drainage in New Orleans
