= May 1995 Louisiana flood =

Natural disaster in the United States

The May 1995 Louisiana flood, also known as the May 1995 Southeast Louisiana and Southern Mississippi Flood, was a heavy rainfall event which occurred across an area stretching from the New Orleans metropolitan area into southern Mississippi. A storm total rainfall maximum of 27.5 inches (700 mm) was recorded near Necaise, Mississippi. Considerable flooding was caused by the rainfall including several record flood crests along impacted river systems.

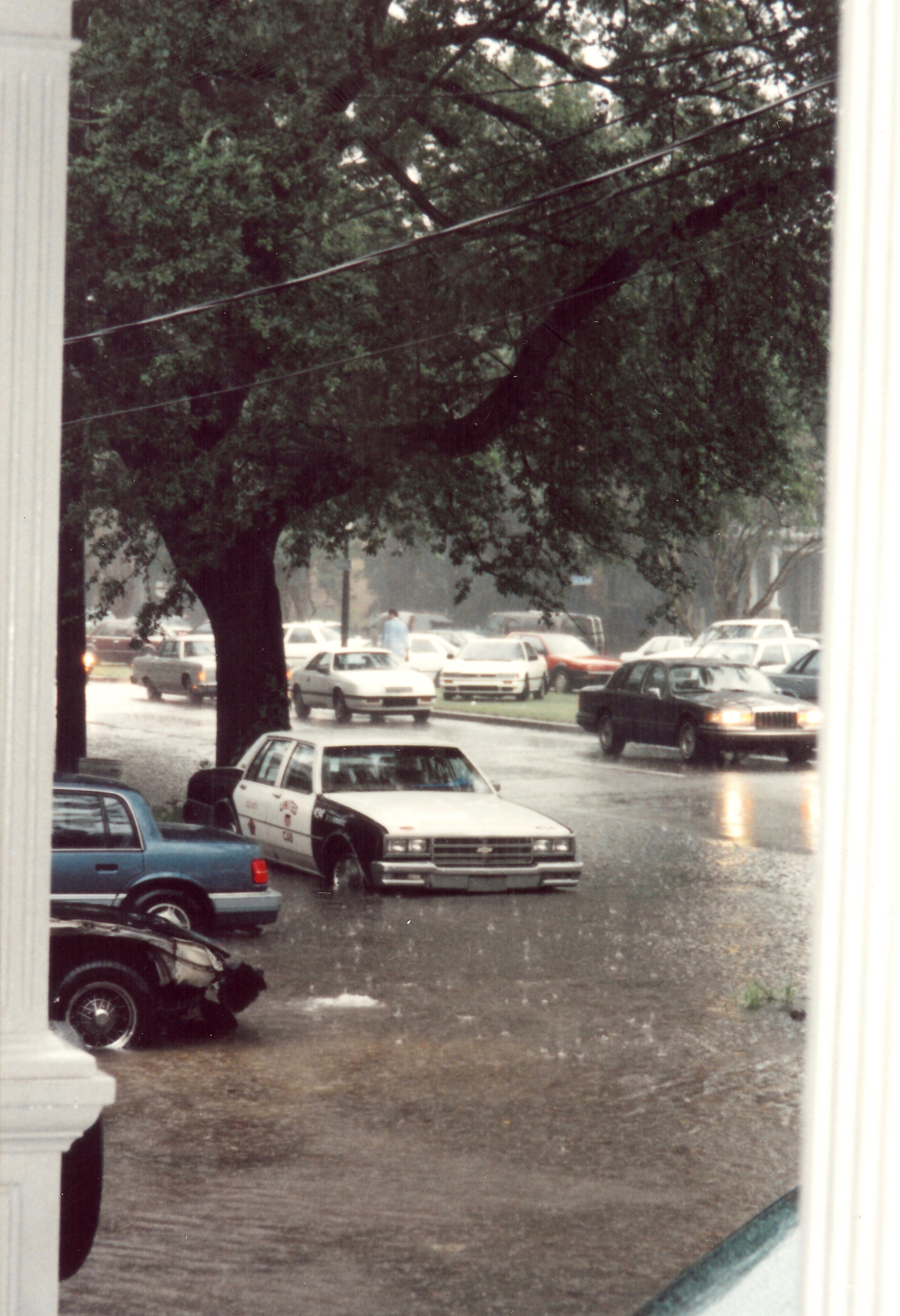
Rising water on Napoleon Avenue, Uptown New Orleans, early in the disaster; water continued to rise into the night.

The flooding caused six fatalities and more than $3.1 billion in damage.

== Meteorological synopsis ==
The entire 40-hour event from the evening of Monday, May 8, through the morning of Wednesday, May 10, consisted of two distinct heavy rainfalls. By Wednesday morning, storm total rainfall amounts of 10 to 20 inches (250 to 510 mm) were common across portions of southeast Louisiana and south Mississippi.

A cold front approached the region from the west, preceded by a squall line. The airmass that entered western Louisiana on May 8 exhibited considerably lower dewpoints than the tropical airmass across east Louisiana and southeast Mississippi. By the evening of May 9, the cold front dissipated in the vicinity of Baton Rouge. The remains of the front served as a focusing axis for heavy precipitation that continued into the late morning hours of May 10. An upper-level trough helped to provide upper-level support to the system. At the surface, warm and moist air moved in from the Gulf of Mexico continually during the event. The swath of highest rainfall totals was closely tied to a theta-e ridge at the 850 mb pressure surface, which stretched from the central Gulf of Mexico into the Mississippi River Delta area.

During each wave of rainfall, heavy, "training" thunderstorms continued to form over the same areas for multiple hours. In the New Orleans area, pumping stations were overwhelmed and could not pump rainfall into Lake Pontchartrain as quickly as it was falling. At the time, pumping stations were only rated to pump 1 inch (25 mm) per hour maximum.

== Timeline ==
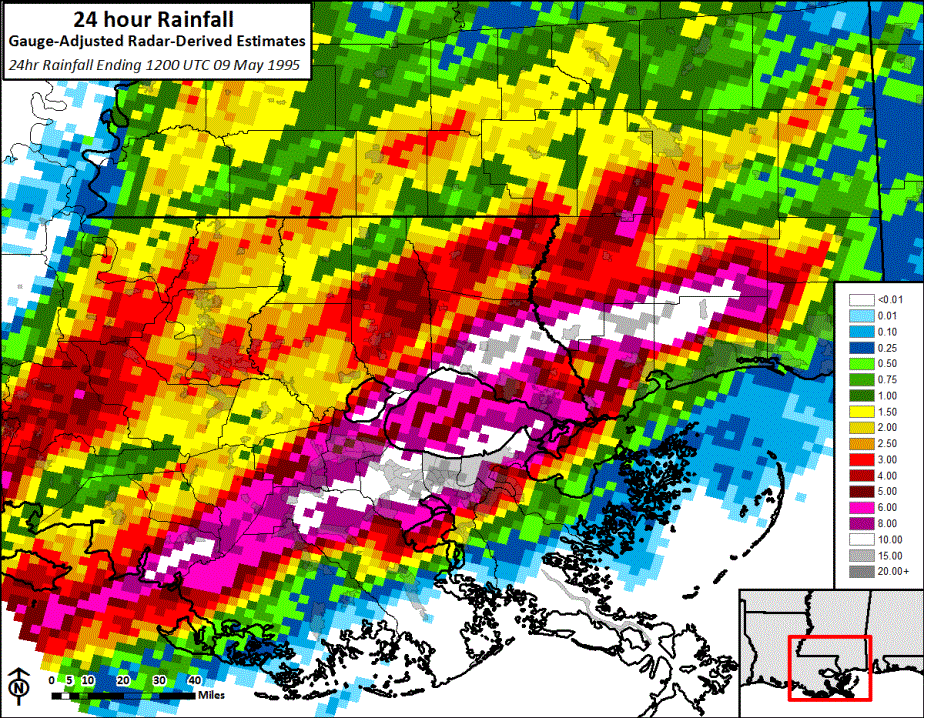
Totals from first wave of rainfall.

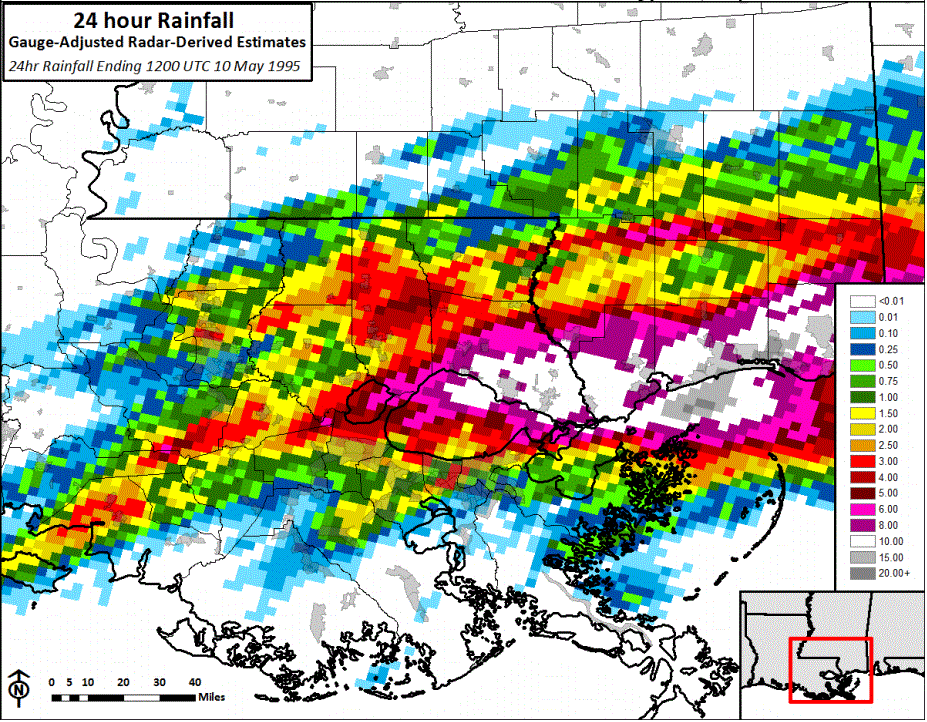
Totals from second wave of rainfall.

- Approximately 5:30 p.m. on May 7... heavy rainfall begins across areas south of Lake Pontchartrain, continuing into the early morning hours of May 8th.
- Early morning hours on May 8... Flooding began in Jefferson Parish and Orleans Parish, including the cities of New Orleans, Metairie, Kenner, River Ridge, and Harahan
- Evening hours on May 9... Heavy rainfall occurs across areas north of Lake Pontchartrain in Saint Tammany Parish, Louisiana, including Slidell, Covington, Mandeville, and Abita Springs. Heavy rainfall also occurs across south Mississippi, especially portions of Pearl River County, Hancock County, and Harrison County, including Bay St. Louis and Gulfport.
- Late evening May 9th... flooding begins in the Lake Pontchartrain Northshore areas of Louisiana and also coastal Mississippi.
- May 10th... severe river flooding impacts areas along the Wolf River, Tchoutacabouffa River, and Jourdan River in Mississippi, each of which set new record stages (Wolf River flooding from Hurricane Isaac in 2012 subsequently broke the record).

== Rainfall ==
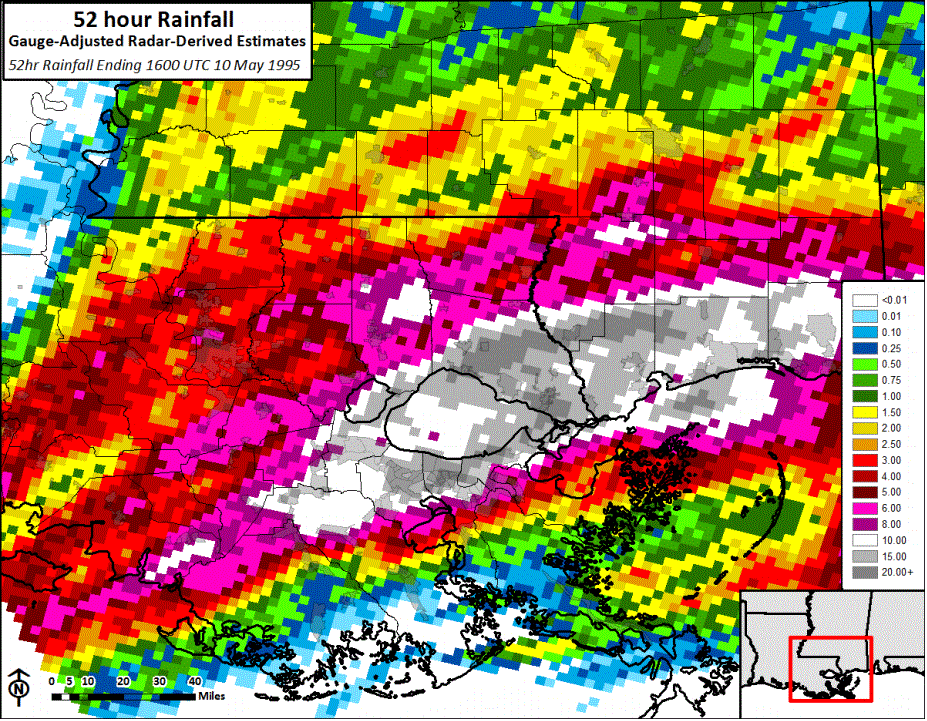
Totals for the entire event.

The heaviest rainfall from the first wave of rainfall occurred on the southshore of Lake Pontchartrain in the New Orleans metropolitan area, with a secondary maxima on the northshore. Heaviest rainfall from the second wave occurred across the northshore of Lake Pontchartrain and coastal Mississippi. By May 10th, rainfall totals of 10-20 inches were common. Some notable two-day totals from the National Weather Service archives and post-event surveys:

- Necaise, Mississippi: 27.50" (698 mm)
- Abita Springs, Louisiana: 24.46" (621 mm)
- New Orleans (Tulane University), LA: 24.05" (611 mm)
- New Orleans (International Airport), LA: 9.67" (246 mm)
- New Orleans (Lakefront Airport), LA: 15.44" (392 mm)
- Slidell, LA: 19.09" (485 mm)

For both waves of rainfall, several locations neared or exceeded 24‑hour rainfall amounts estimated as having a 1% chance of being exceeded in a given year, (100 year average recurrence interval) as determined by both the NOAA Atlas 14 and reports by the Southern Regional Climate Center. The rainfall maximum near Necaise of 27.5 inches (700 mm) was estimated as having only a 0.1% chance of being exceeded in a given year (1000 year average recurrence interval).

== Impact ==
Similar floods occurred in November 1979 Louisiana flood and November 7–8, 1989 Louisiana flood, although the May 1995 event was more extensive and costlier than both combined. It was the worst flooding the city had experienced between hurricanes Betsy in 1965 and Katrina in 2005. There has been no comparable recorded flood in New Orleans caused by rain alone.

Six people died as a result of the flooding. The city of New Orleans suffered $360 million in damages, and the damage of the surrounding areas put that total above $3 billion. Some 56,000 homes were damaged in 12 parishes. Thousands of cars were flooded. 14,600 homes and apartments were flooded in Jefferson Parish alone.

== Aftermath ==
New pumping stations were built and canals were expanded to prevent further catastrophic rainfall floods. Some politicians began to push for pumping rain waters directly into the Mississippi River, but environmental groups argued against this plan. The flood prompted expansions and improvements of the city's drainage and pumping system, especially in the worst hit portions of the city, including improvements to the underground canals under Napoleon and Claiborne Avenues in Broadmoor and other SELA projects to improve drainage in Hollygrove connected to the 17th St. Canal.

== See also ==
- Drainage in New Orleans
