= Selah (disambiguation) =

Selah is a Hebrew word meaning "pause, reflection", within the context of a prayer or psalms.

Selah may also refer to:

== Music ==
- Selah (band), a contemporary Christian trio
- "Selah" (song), a song by Kanye West from Jesus Is King
- "Selah", a song by P.O.D. from Brown
- "Selah", a song by Emeli Sandé from Long Live the Angels
- "Selah", a song by Phinehas from Fight Through the Night

== People ==
- Selah (biblical figure), an ancestor of Abraham according to the Bible
- Selah Marley, American fashion model and singer.
- Selah Sue, Belgian singer and songwriter

== Other ==
- Selah, Washington, a town in Washington, U.S.
- Selah (Hebrew: סל"ה), Hebrew abbreviation for "Students before Parents", an Israeli immigration program for Jewish youth
- Selah, the protagonist in Selah and the Spades, a 2019 American film
- Selaa, village in Lebanon

== See also ==
- Salat, an Islamic prayer to Allah
- Sela (disambiguation)
- Salah (disambiguation)
