= Outeiro de Rei =

Coordinates: 43°09′00″N 7°17′00″W

- Municipality
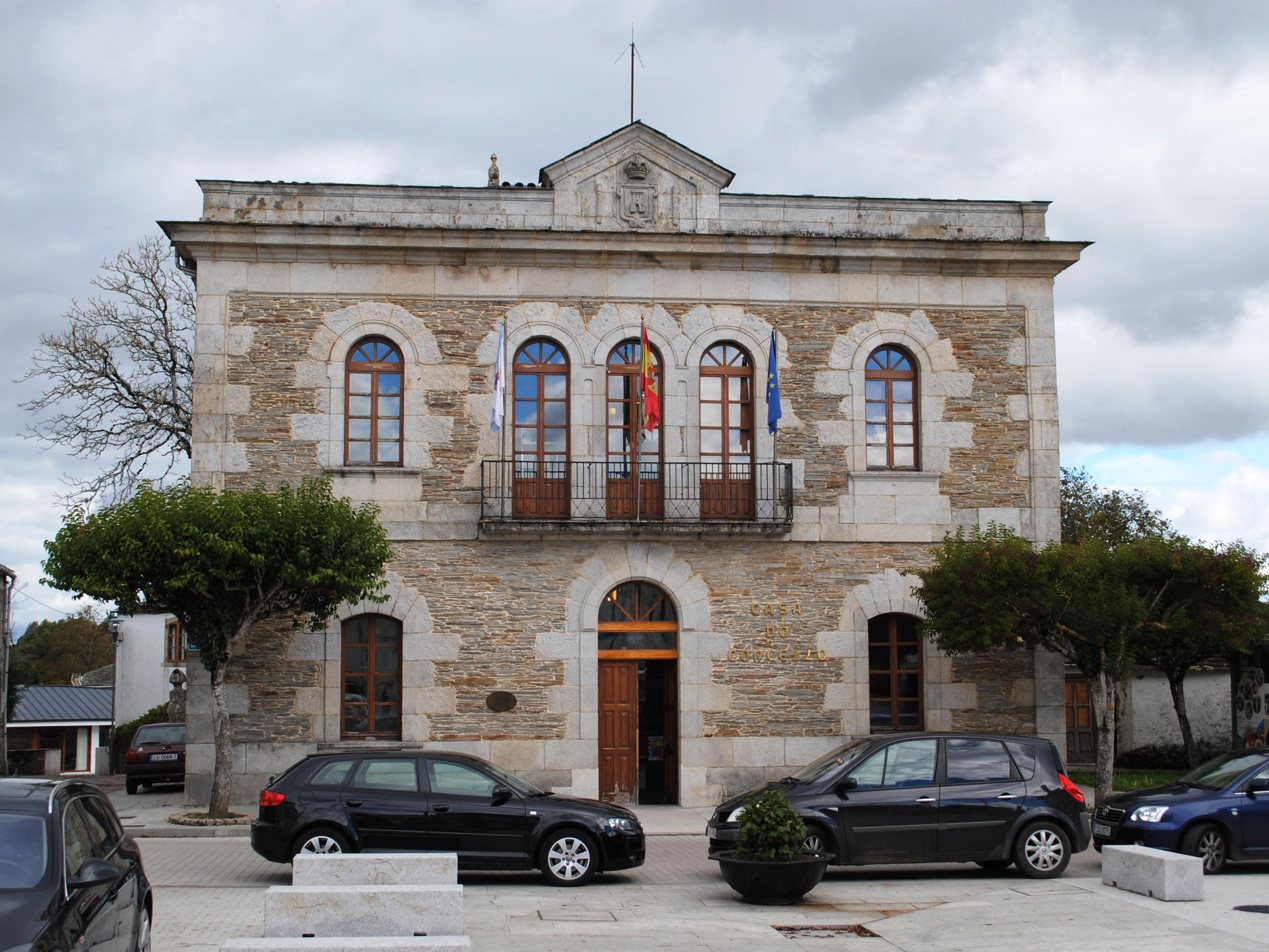
- Town hall.

- Coat of arms

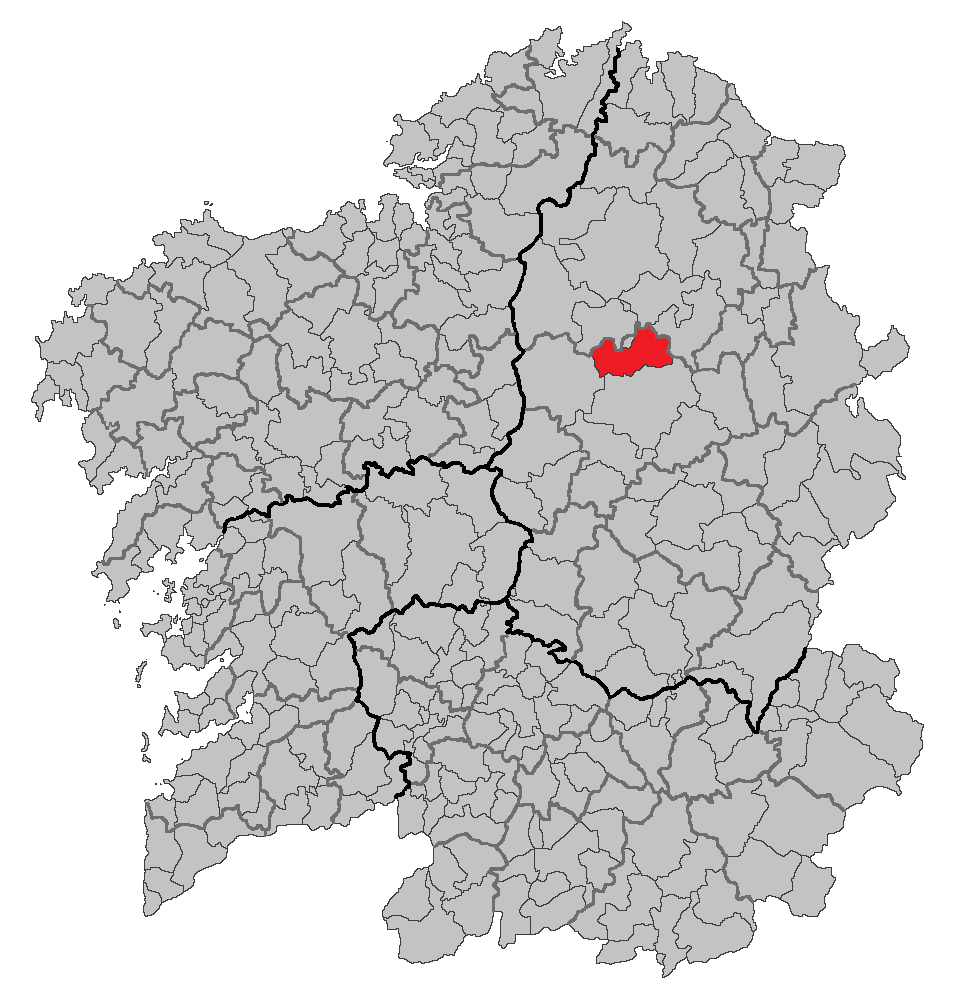
- Location of Outeiro de Rei

- Location in Spain
- Country: Spain
- Autonomous community: Galicia
- Province: Lugo
- Comarca: Lugo

Government
  - Alcalde: José Pardo Lombao (PP)

Population (2025-01-01)
  - Total: 5,420
- Time zone: UTC+1 (CET)
  - Summer (DST): UTC+2 (CEST)
- Postal code: 27730
- Website: Official website

Outeiro de Rei is a municipality located in the province of Lugo, in the autonomous community of Galicia, Spain. It belongs to the comarca of Lugo. In 2016, it had a population of 5047 according to the INE.

== Etymology ==
The Galician word outeiro is derived from Latin altarium, meaning a high or elevated territory. De Rei means "of the king" in Galician, and can be found as a suffix in multiple other toponyms of Galicia.
