= Francesco Cellario =

Francesco Cellario (1520–1569) was an Italian Protestant pastor. Born in Lacchiarella, he became the pastor of Morbegno. He was captured by Catholics and burnt at the stake in 1569.
