= Cella (surname) =

Cella is an Italian surname. Notable people with the surname include:

- Bernhard Cella (born 1969), Austrian artist
- Charles J. Cella (1936–2017), American businessman
- Elisa Cella (born 1982), Italian volleyball player
- Ettore Cella (1913–2004), Swiss film director
- Giancarlo Cella (1940–2026), Italian footballer and coach
- Joseph Cella (born 1969), American diplomat
- Len Cella (1937–2023), American filmmaker
- Louis Cella (1866–1918), American businessman
- Nada Cella (1971–1996), Italian murder victim

== See also ==
- Cela (surname)
- Cello
- Celle
