= Riverdale High School (Jefferson Parish, Louisiana) =

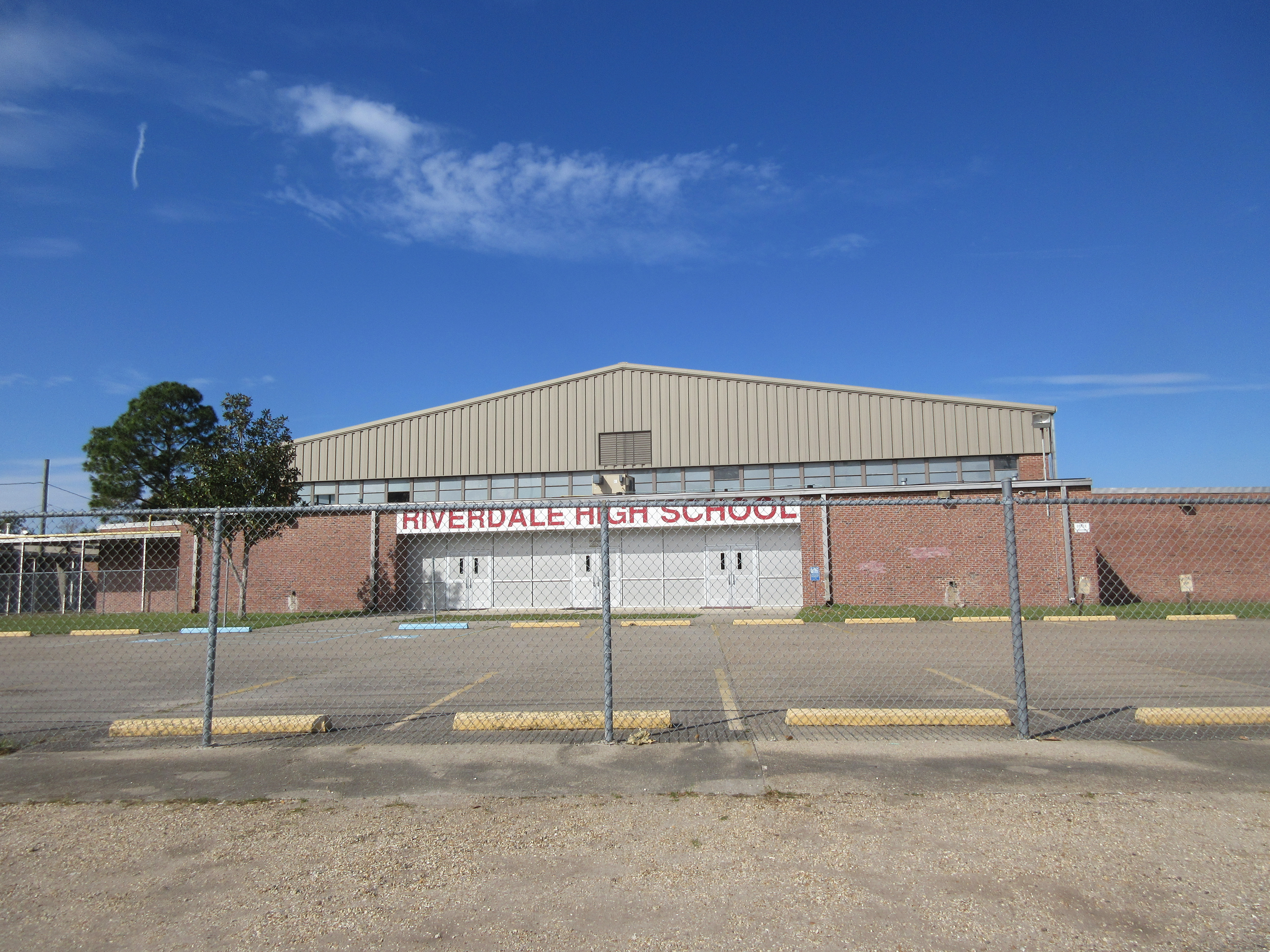
- Jefferson Parish in Louisiana

Location
- 240 Riverdale Drive; Jefferson, Louisiana 70121-3599; United States; 29°57′34″N 90°09′58″W

Information
- Type: Public
- Motto: Knowledge, Loyalty, Integrity
- Established: 1962
- School district: Jefferson Parish Public Schools
- CEEB code: 12120
- Principal: Jennifer Washington
- Teaching staff: 67.81 (FTE)
- Grades: 9–12
- Gender: Coeducational
- Enrollment: 1,325 (2023–2024)
- Average class size: 20-24
- Student to teacher ratio: 19.54
- Classrooms: 250
- Campus: Organic
- Campus type: Suburban
- Colours: Red and White
- Slogan: "Every Student; Every Future!"
- Athletics: LHSAA 4A
- Mascot: Scottish Rebel
- Team name: Rebels
- Rival: East Jefferson High School
- Accreditation: IBO, SACS, AdvancED
- Website: riverdalehigh.jpschools.org

Riverdale High School is a public secondary school in Jefferson, unincorporated Jefferson Parish, Louisiana, United States. It is a part of the Jefferson Parish Public Schools.

Riverdale's attendance boundary includes several communities. They are Jefferson, Harahan, Elmwood, and River Ridge. In addition the school serves portions of Metairie.

== History ==
Riverdale High School was established in 1962 as an all-girls, grades 9–12 high school, with a Scottish Lassie as the mascot. The school became coed in 1980 and the mascot changed to the Scottish Rebel. Grades 7–8 were added in 1986, followed by grade 6 in 1988, but the middle and high school programs were split into separate schools in 1994. With the separation, Riverdale High School adopted 4x4 block scheduling, which splits the academic year into quarters and uses a four-period day.

The school sustained minor damage during Hurricane Katrina and was among the first schools in the school district allowed to reopened. During recovery efforts, some National Guard troops used the empty school buildings for shelter. In the aftermath of Katrina, the student population dwindled and it was proposed that the middle and high schools be merged and the middle school campus be used to house the high school section of the overcrowded Haynes Academy. Parents opposed the idea as it would cause too much upheaval for their children as they had just returned to the area after being evacuated. The plans never went through and Riverdale Middle School remained open.

In 2023 the school absorbed a portion of the attendance boundary of the closed Grace King High School.

=== School uniforms ===
At the beginning there, was no uniform requirement. Everyone was free to wear their own clothes. In the late 1990s, it became mandatory to wear uniforms. Students are required to wear a Riverdale oxford button-down shirt, khaki pants, grey plaid skirt, and either a Riverdale V neck sweater or Riverdale pull over sweater. No sweatshirt other than a Riverdale sweatshirt is allowed, and the sweatshirt cannot have a hood.

== Campus ==
There are a total of ten buildings that make up the campus. There a four buildings which make a square. Within the square is a courtyard with a fountain and various seating. North Hall, South Hall, and West Hall consist of various classrooms. East Hall is the entrance to school, along with the administration offices and the library. Other buildings on campus include a Gymnasium (consisting of the basketball court, the basketball locker rooms, coaches' offices, locker room showers, the weight room, and special education exercise room), the AFJROTC Building (consisting of AFJROTC, the Band Room, and the Levee View Theater), the Athletic Building (consisting of the TV Studio, Locker Rooms, and Coaches' Offices), the Cafeteria (first floor - cafeteria, second floor - Art Classrooms and Home Economic Classrooms and Kitchens), the Health Center, and the Student Council Building (consisting of the SBA room, the wrestling room, and wood shop). There is also a field used for baseball and football practice near the Athletic Building.

== Curriculum ==
Riverdale has been an IB World School since the 2006-07 academic year and offers the IB Diploma Program.

== Extracurricular activities ==
The extracurricular activities consist of Band (Scottish Brigade), flag team, dance team, SBA (Student Body Association), GSA, Key Club, AFJROTC, National Honor Society, Speech and Debate, TV Productions, Yearbook, and 4-H.

== Athletics ==
Riverdale High athletics competes in the LHSAA.

The athletics at Riverdale High School consist of baseball, softball, soccer, cheer leading, football, wrestling, volleyball, basketball, cross country, and track.

== In popular culture ==
- The Lifetime film For One Night was filmed at Riverdale in the summer of 2005. The film starred Raven-Symoné.
- In the summer of 2006, the Lifetime movie Life Is Not a Fairy Tale, which starred Fantasia Barrino, was partially filmed at Riverdale High School.
- During the fall of 2009, Riverdale was used to shoot both interior and exterior school shots for Lifetime's film The Pregnancy Pact.
- In 2010, WWE Studios' Legendary (film), which starred John Cena, was filmed at Riverdale High School. Shortly after, the WWE Studios' film That's What I Am, starring Randy Orton, was also filmed at Riverdale High School.
- In the summer of 2011, parts of the film version of 21 Jump Street starring Channing Tatum and Jonah Hill were filmed at Riverdale High School. It was released in theaters March 16, 2012.
- In February 2025, the A24 film The Drama was filmed at Riverdale High School. Scenes filmed featured Zendaya's character, Emma, as a teenager during her time at fictional high school Portside High School. The Drama was released in April 2026.
