= Jefferson, Louisiana =

Jefferson, Louisiana Old Jefferson
- Census-designated place
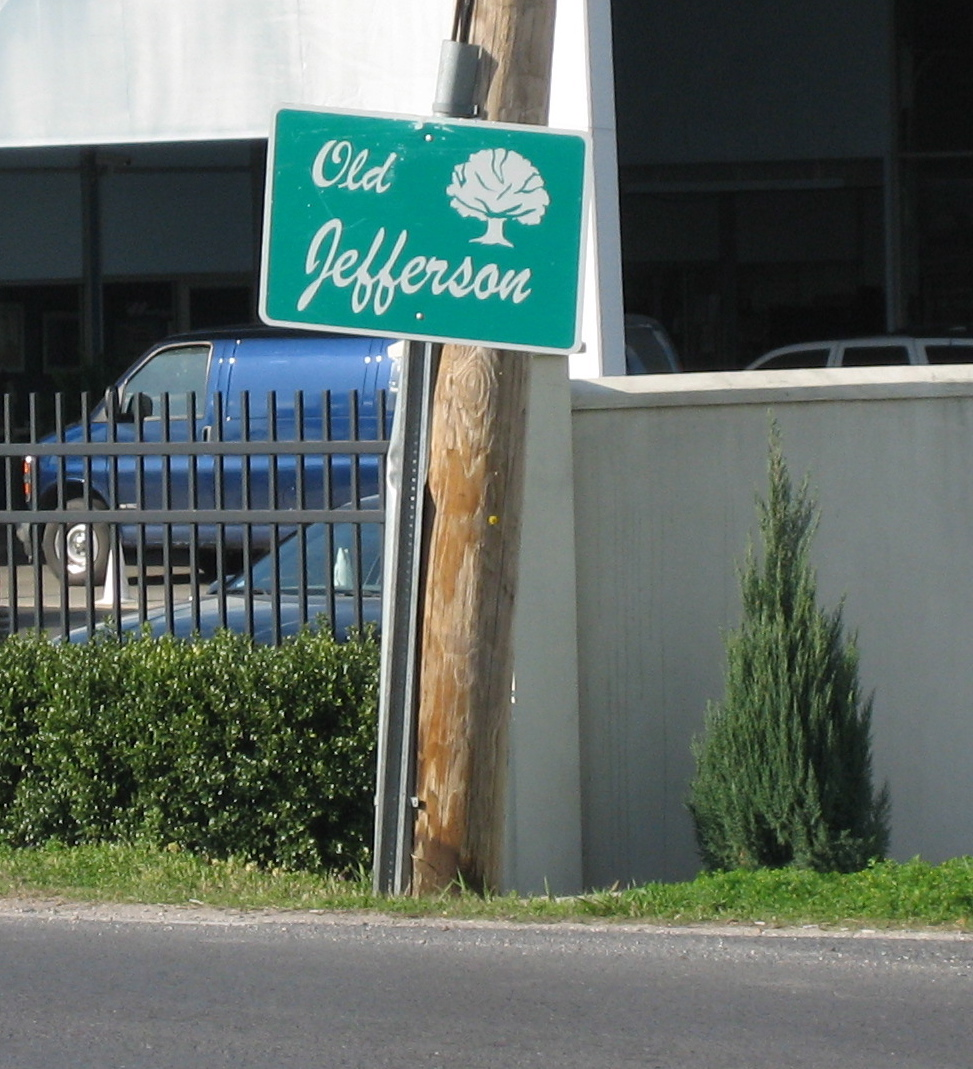
- Old Jefferson welcome sign at the boundary with the City of New Orleans

- Location of Jefferson in Louisiana
- Coordinates: 29°57′51″N 90°09′26″W
- Country: United States
- State: Louisiana
- Parish: Jefferson

Area
  - Total: 3.27 sq mi (8.48 km^{2})
  - Land: 2.71 sq mi (7.01 km^{2})
  - Water: 0.57 sq mi (1.47 km^{2})
- Elevation: 3 ft (0.91 m)

Population (2020)
  - Total: 10,633
  - Density: 3,927.6/sq mi (1,516.44/km^{2})
- Time zone: UTC-6 (CST)
  - Summer (DST): UTC-5 (CDT)
- ZIP Code: 70121
- Area code: 504
- FIPS code: 22-38145
- GNIS code: 2402632

Jefferson is a census-designated place (CDP) in Jefferson Parish, Louisiana, United States, on the north side (referred to as the "East Bank") of the Mississippi River. Jefferson is part of the New Orleans–Metairie–Kenner metropolitan statistical area. The population was 11,193 at the 2010 census, and 10,533 in 2020. It is often known by locals as "Old Jefferson" (to distinguish itself from the rest of Jefferson Parish), but should not be confused with Old Jefferson in East Baton Rouge Parish, Louisiana.

== History ==
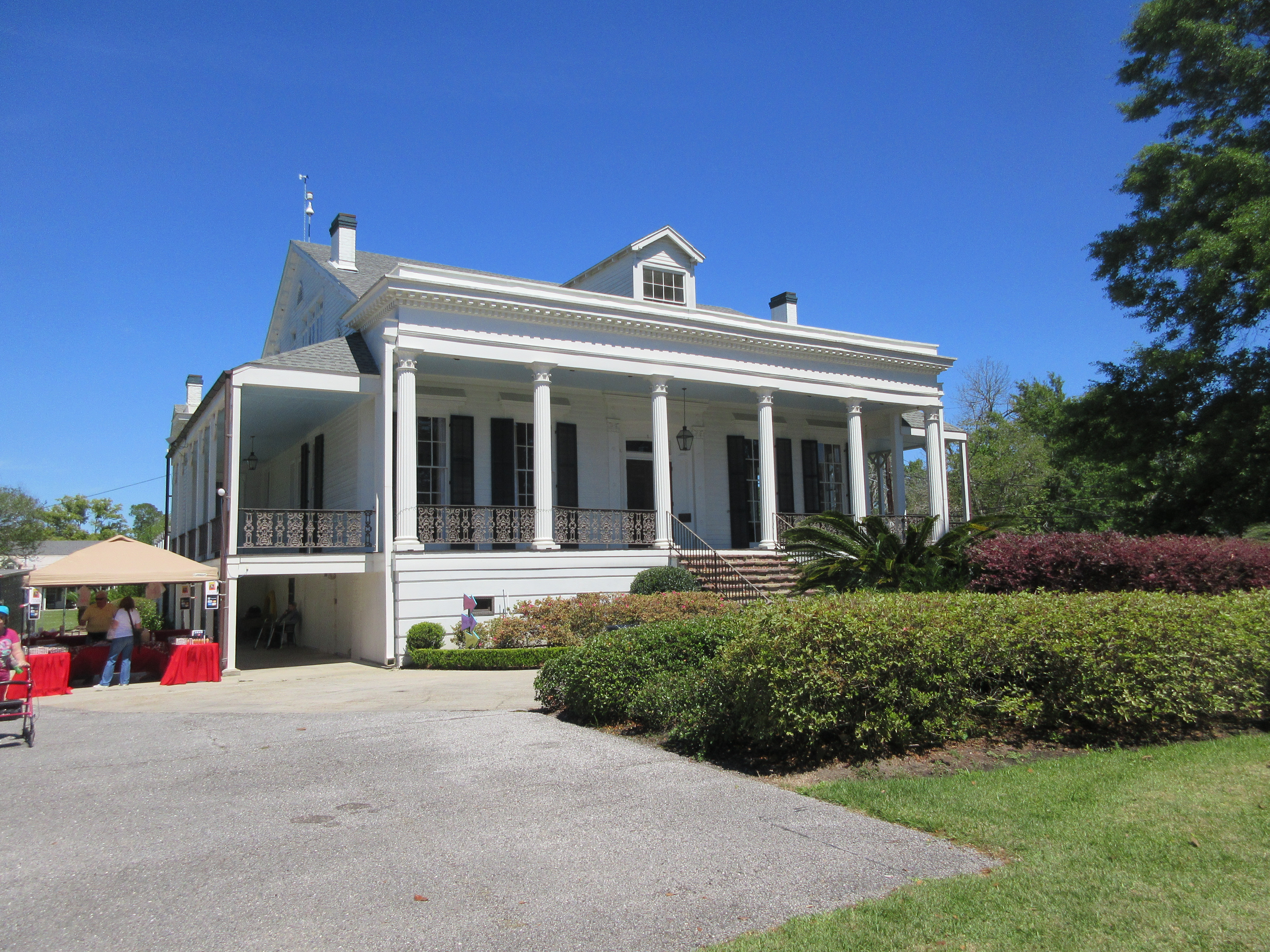
Whitehall Plantation House is a rare survivor from the area's plantation era.

Early French colonial documents show what would become Jefferson as part of the "Tchoupitoulas Coast" of Native American settlement. In the French and Spanish colonial era it was divided into a series of plantations with boundary lines perpendicular to the Mississippi River.

In the American Civil War, Camp Parapet was built originally by Confederate forces to defend New Orleans from an attack from the upriver side. After the Union liberated the city sailing up from downriver, U.S. troops expanded the fortifications to defend against Confederate counterattacks which never came.

What is now Jefferson includes formerly separate small communities dating back to the 19th century, including, Hoeyville, New Carrollon, Southport, and Shrewsbury, along with 20th century subdivisions/land developments including Azalea Gardens, Camellia Gardens, Jefferson Heights, and Rio Vista. Some of these names continue to sometimes be used locally to refer to neighborhoods.

The current four-lane Jefferson Highway was inaugurated in 1928, accelerating development as a suburban area within Greater New Orleans.

Former landmarks included what is best remembered as "The Beverly". An old plantation house was first converted to a "road house" music venue called "Suburban Gardens" in the 1920s; Louis Armstrong and his band had a summer residency here in 1931. In 1945 it was expanded into a lush (but illegal) gambling casino under the name the Beverly Country Club. After federal crackdowns, it became a dinner theater until it burned down in 1983.

== Geography ==
Jefferson is located in northern Jefferson Parish at 29°57′51″N 90°9′26″W (29.964132, -90.157170). It is bordered to the north by Metairie, to the west by Elmwood, to the south, across the Mississippi River, by Bridge City, and to the east by the city of New Orleans in Orleans Parish. U.S. Route 90 (Jefferson Highway) runs through the center of the community, leading 6 miles (10 km) east to downtown New Orleans.

According to the United States Census Bureau, the Jefferson CDP has a total area of 3.3 square miles (8.5 km^{2}), of which 2.7 square miles (7.0 km^{2}) are land and 0.58 square miles (1.5 km^{2}), or 17.46%, are water. The western part of Jefferson's Census area was lost to Elmwood during the 2000 census.

The northern boundary is separated from Metairie by the triple barriers of a drainage canal, railroad tracks, and the Earhart Expressway. The only open public road crossings are Causeway Boulevard and Central Avenue. Many years ago, Labarre Road and Shrewsbury Road connected from River Road to Airline Dr. Many Residents in Old Jefferson prefer the route to continue to Airline Dr. Old Jefferson is now a tucked away neighborhood. It's largely expanding with new shops and businesses coming in. Landmarks include the Ochsner Medical Center complex.

== Demographics ==
Historical population
| Census | Pop. | Note | %± |
|---|---|---|---|
| 1960 | 19,353 | | — |
| 1970 | 16,489 | | −14.8% |
| 1980 | 15,550 | | −5.7% |
| 1990 | 14,521 | | −6.6% |
| 2000 | 11,843 | | −18.4% |
| 2010 | 11,193 | | −5.5% |
| 2020 | 10,633 | | −5.0% |
U.S. Decennial Census; 1950 1960 1970 1980; 1990 2000 2010

Jefferson first appeared as an unincorporated place in the 1960 U.S. census; and as a census designated place in the 1980 United States census.

Jefferson racial composition as of 2020
| Race | Number | Percentage |
|---|---|---|
| White (non-Hispanic) | 6,281 | 59.07% |
| Black or African American (non-Hispanic) | 2,317 | 21.79% |
| Native American | 26 | 0.24% |
| Asian | 148 | 1.39% |
| Pacific Islander | 5 | 0.05% |
| Other/Mixed | 407 | 3.83% |
| Hispanic or Latino | 1,449 | 13.63% |

The 2019 American Community Survey estimated 10,501 people lived in the CDP, down from 11,193 at the 2010 United States census. At the 2020 census, there were 10,533 people in the CDP. In 2019, the racial and ethnic makeup was 62% non-Hispanic white, 23.5% Black or African American, 0.4% Native American, 1.1% Asian, 0.6% some other race, 1.7% two or more races, and 10.8% Hispanic and Latino American of any race. In 2020, its makeup was 59.07% non-Hispanic white, 21.79% Black or African American, 0.25% Native American, 1.39% Asian, 0.05% Pacific Islander, 3.83% two or more races, and 13.63% Hispanic and Latino American of any race. From earlier census reports and estimates, 2019 and 2020 have revealed the continuous diversification of the United States overall, representing a stark rise against the non-Hispanic white population. The median household income was $50,972 and 12.6% of the population lived at or below the poverty line according to 2019 census estimates.

== Education ==
=== Primary and secondary schools ===
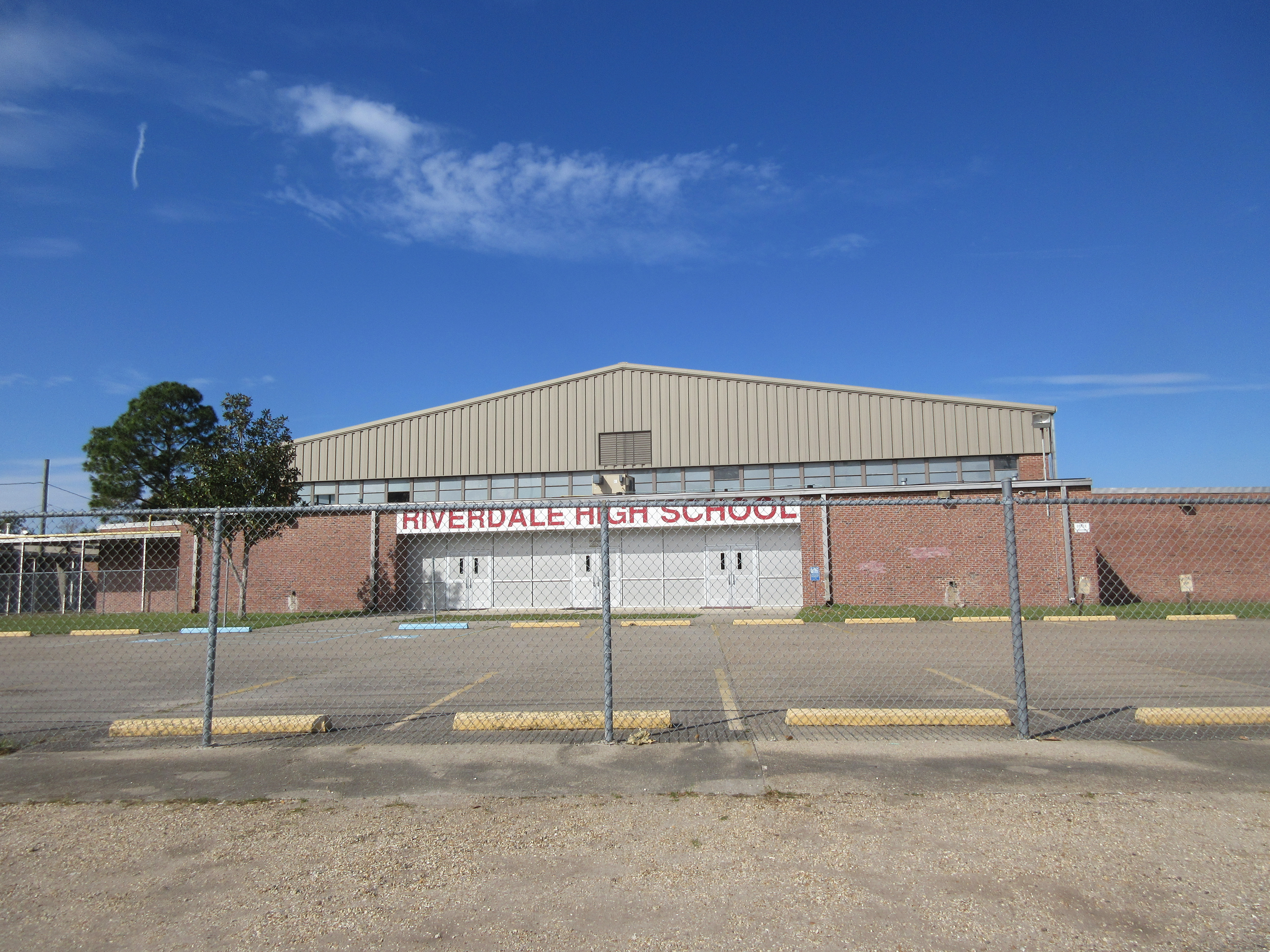
Riverdale High School

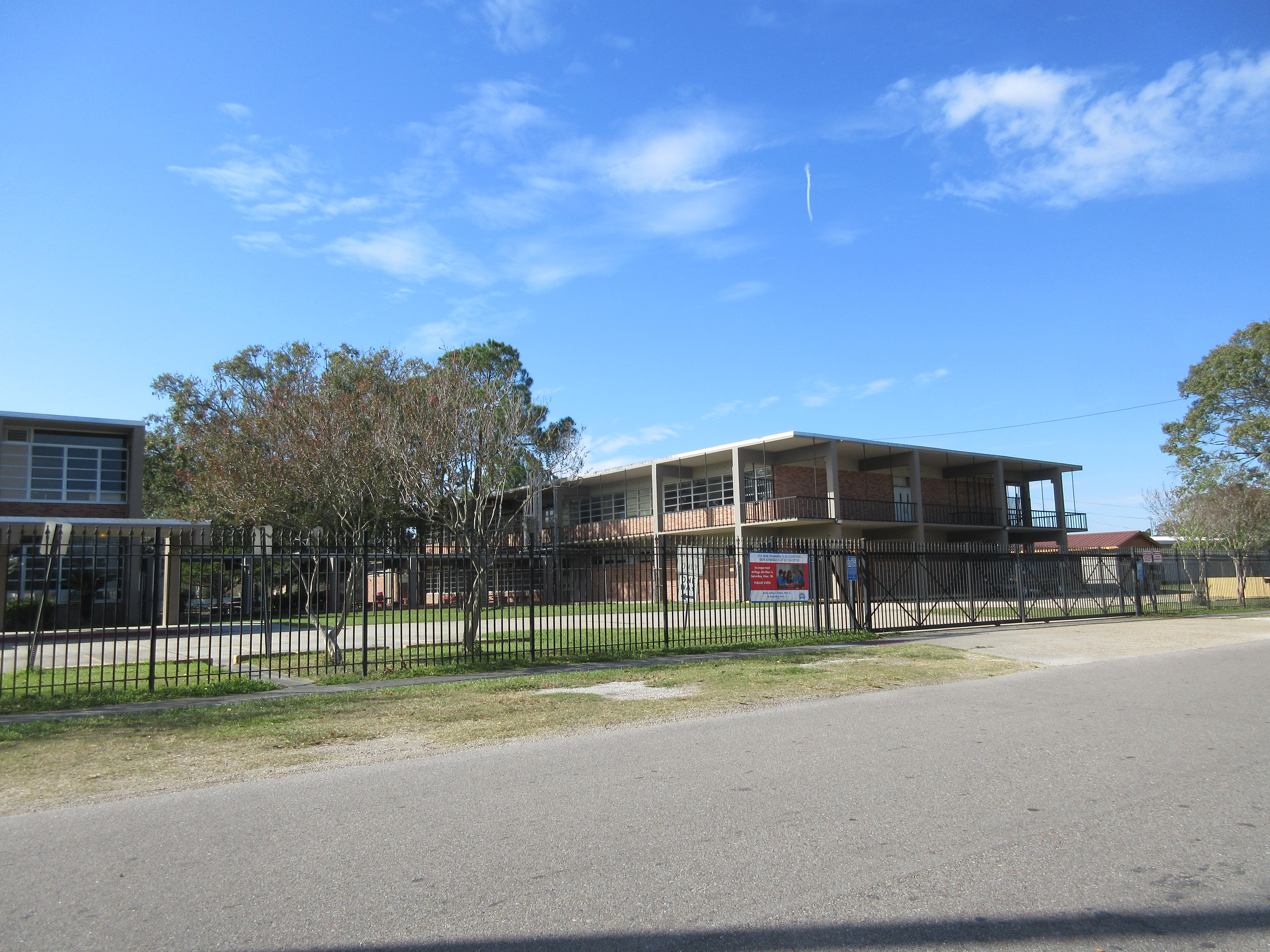
Riverdale High School

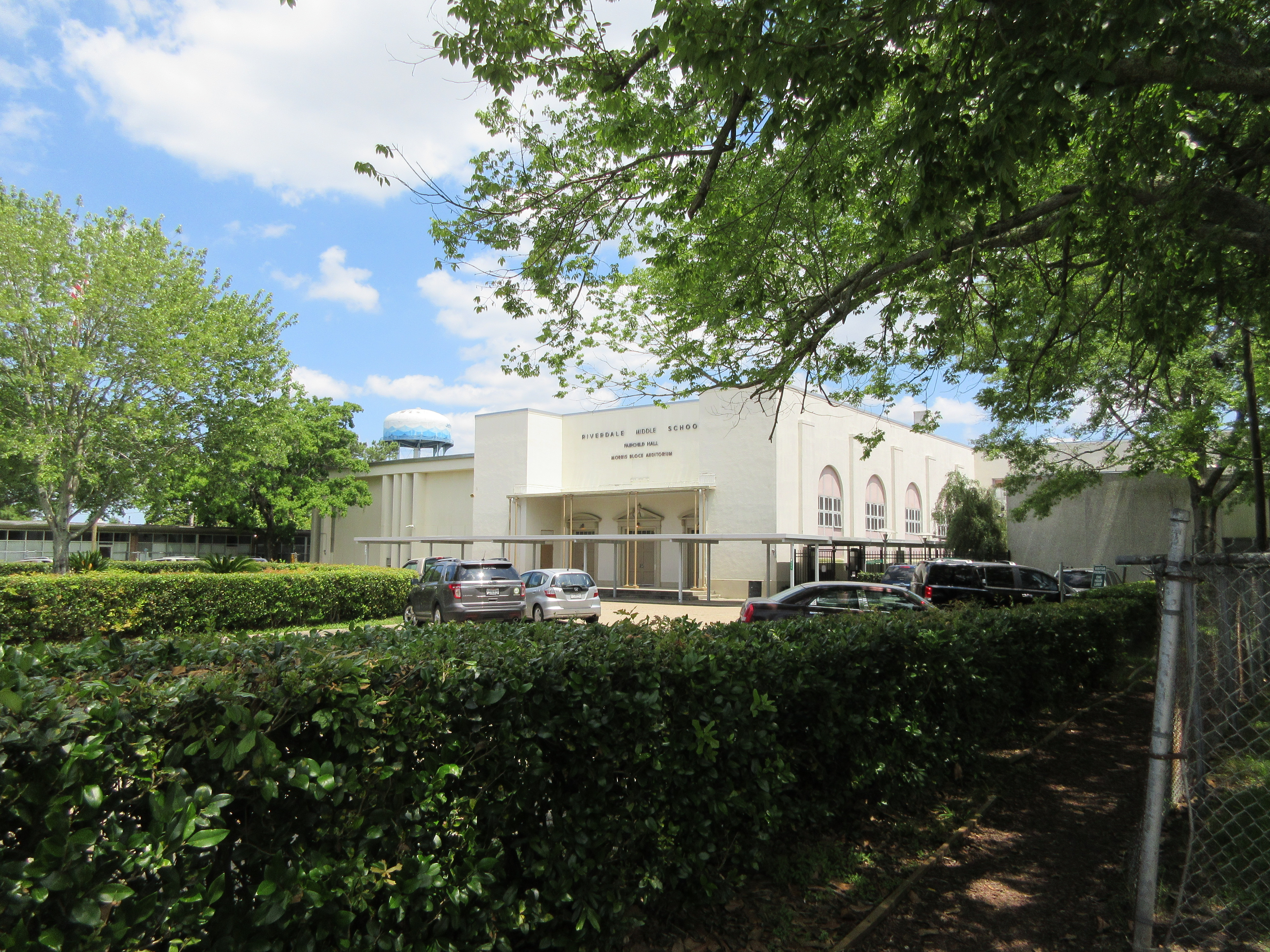
Riverdale Middle School

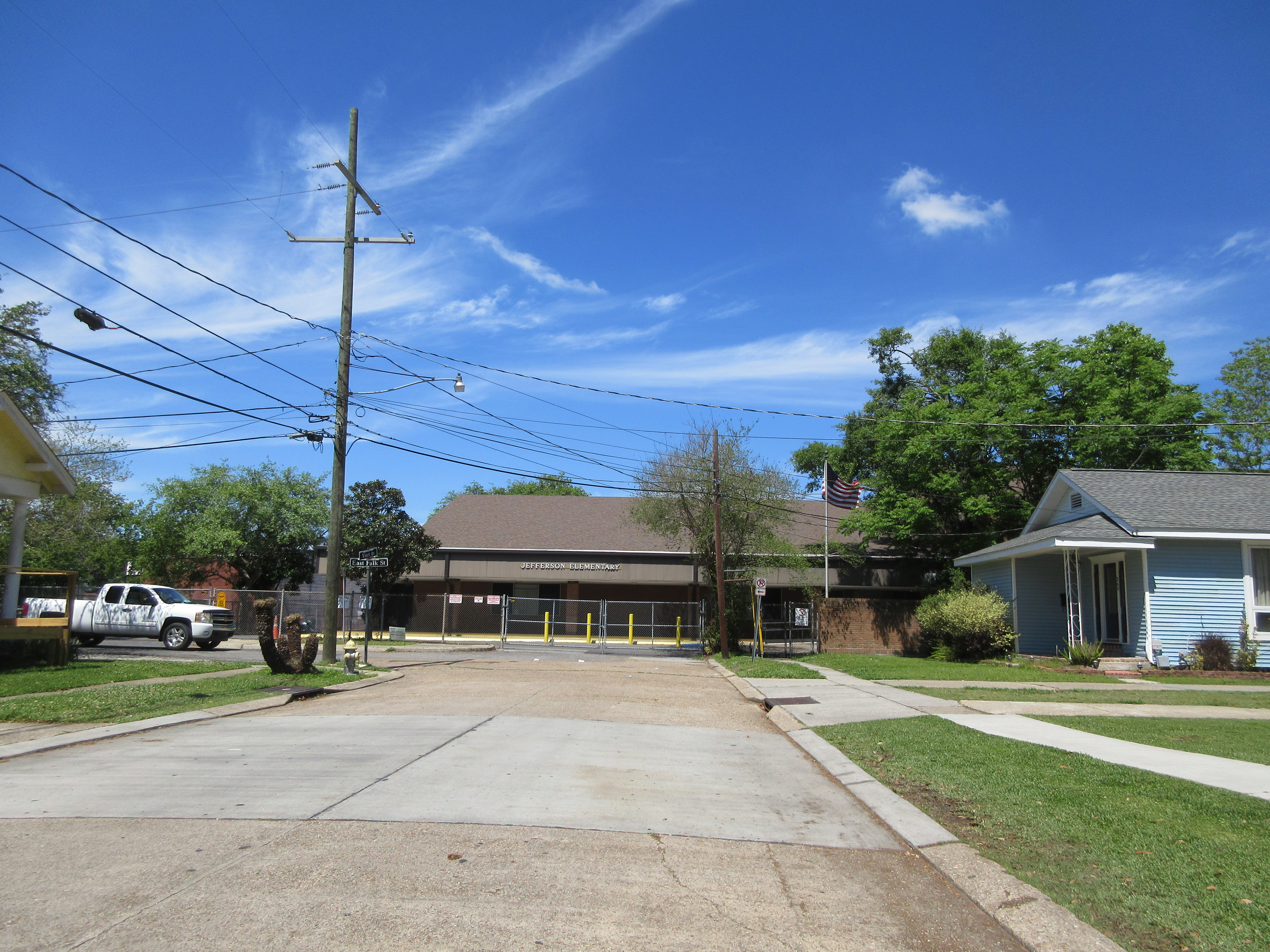
Jefferson Elementary School

Jefferson Parish Public Schools operates schools in the parish and serves Jefferson.

Residents are zoned to: Jefferson K-8 School in Jefferson. Jefferson Elementary and Riverdale Middle were merged into a single school in 2020. Residents are also zoned to Riverdale High School in Jefferson.

In regards to the advanced studies academies, students are zoned to Metairie Academy or Haynes Academy in Old Metairie.

Previously some residents were zoned to Dolhonde Elementary in Metairie.

Private schools:

- St. Agnes School (Roman Catholic Archdiocese of New Orleans) a K-7 Catholic school of the Roman Catholic Archdiocese of New Orleans, was previously in Jefferson. It was founded in 1941, and closed in 2015. In 2014 it had 161 students, and then in 2015 it had 125 students. Principal Michael Buras stated that the school community gained an acceptance that the school will close. The school accepted school vouchers. As of 2020 Jefferson Chamber Foundation Academy (JCFA) maintains a charter school for non-traditional students in the building.

=== Public libraries ===
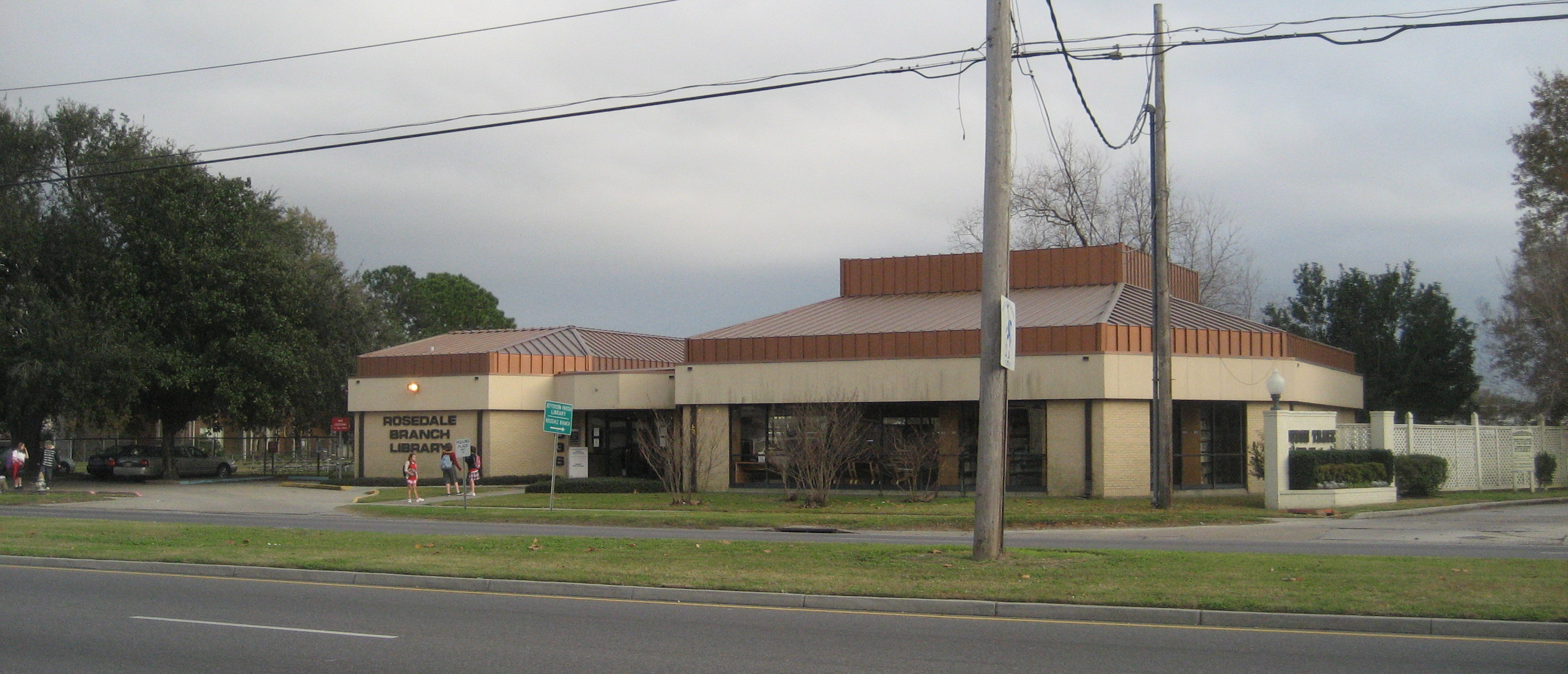
Rosedale branch library

Jefferson Parish Library operates the Rosedale Library in Jefferson. A Greek-revival plantation house named "Rosedale," established in 1838, formerly stood on the present-day site of the library. Two fires in 1978 destroyed the 140-year-old house. The library was established in 1986.

== Healthcare ==
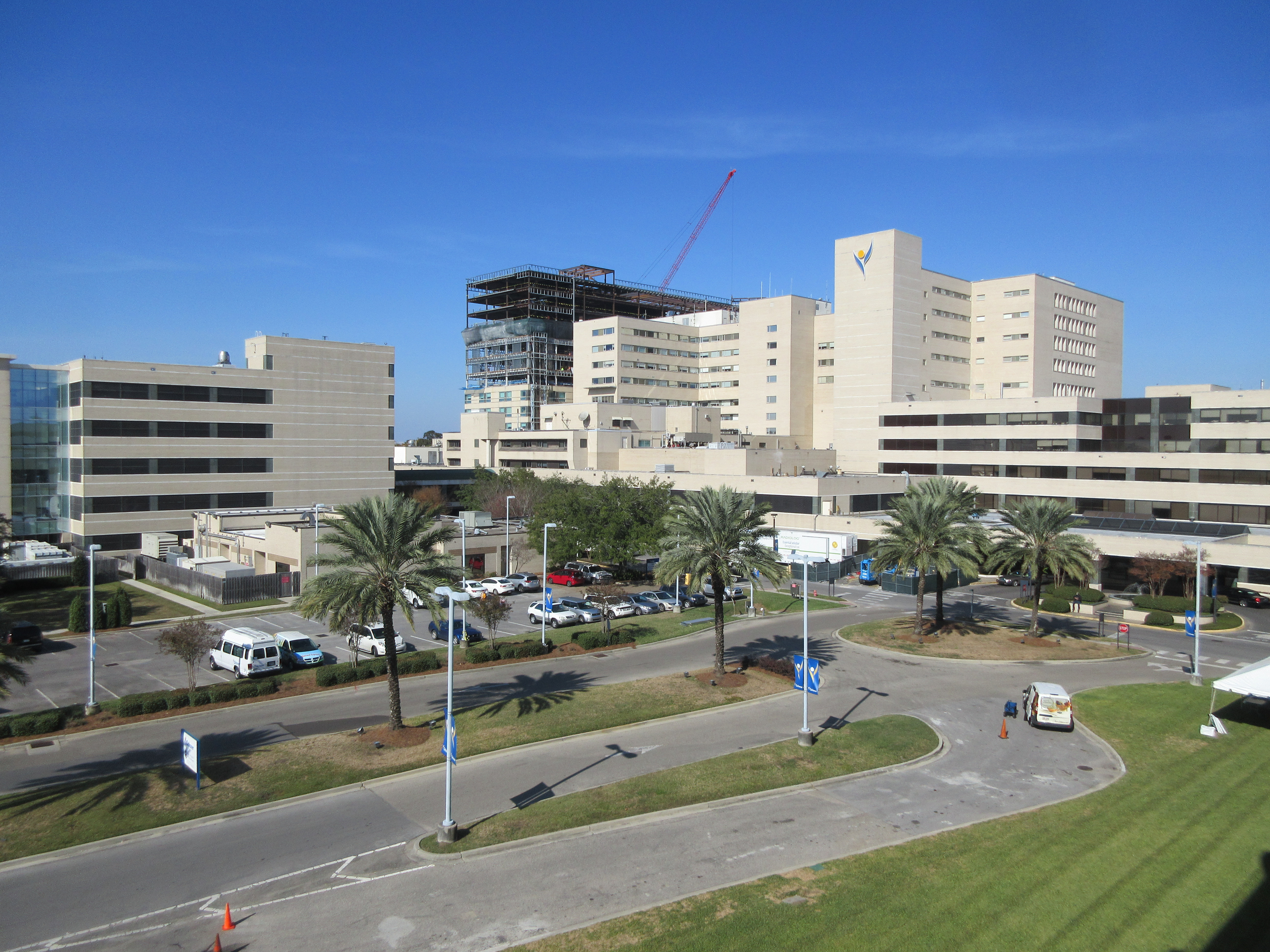
Ochsner Medical Center, which houses the administrative headquarters of Ochsner Health System

Ochsner Medical Center of the Ochsner Health System is in Jefferson CDP.

== Notable people ==
Old Jefferson was home to jazz musicians Johnny Wiggs and William "Baba" Ridgely. It is also the home of House Majority Whip Steve Scalise.
