= Metairie, Louisiana =

Metairie Métairie (French)
- Census-designated place
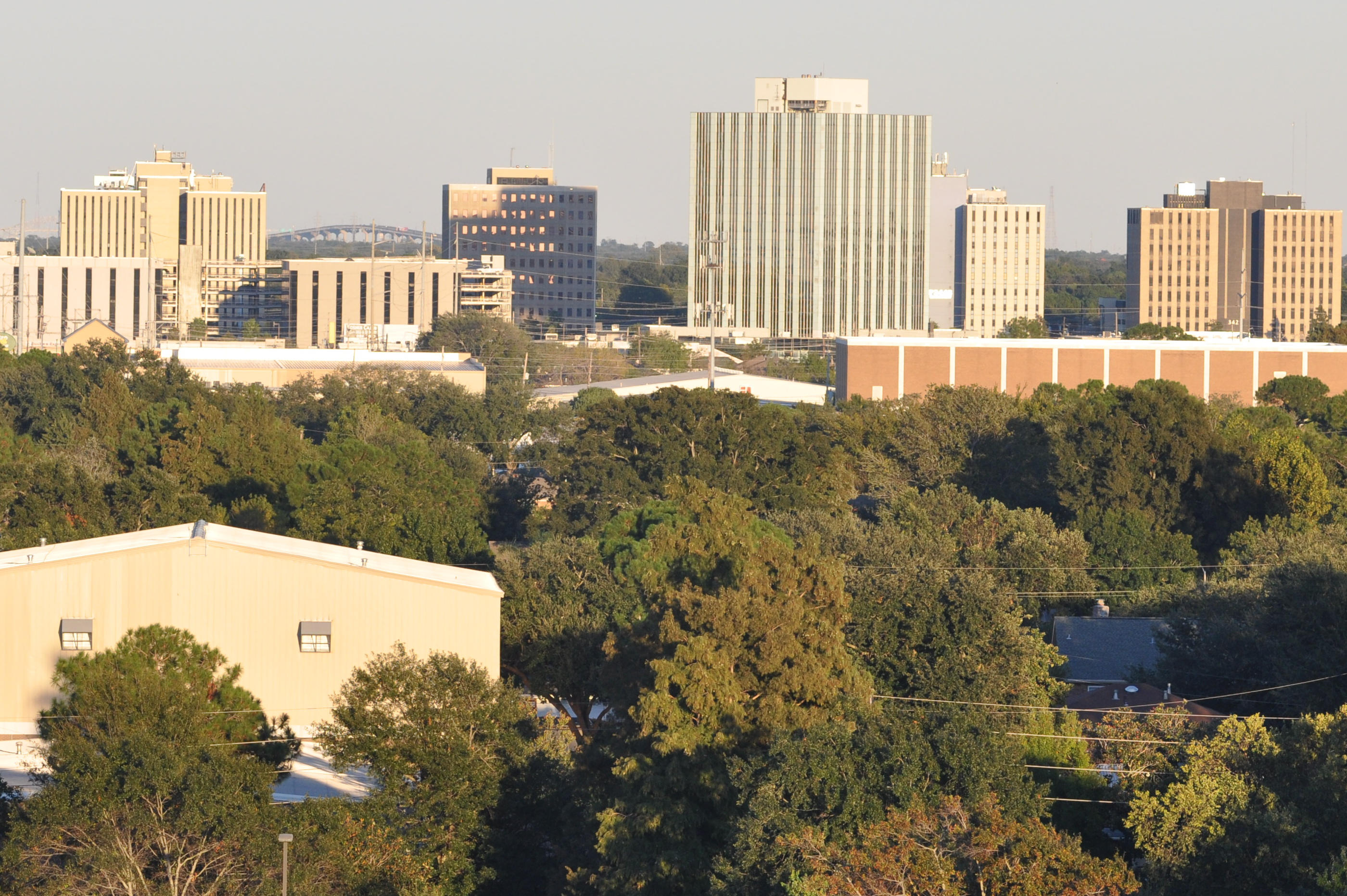
- Metairie Central Business District

- Flag

- Location of Metairie in Louisiana Metairie (the United States)
- Coordinates: 29°59′52″N 90°10′39″W
- Country: United States
- State: Louisiana
- Parish: Jefferson

Area
  - Total: 23.30 sq mi (60.35 km^{2})
  - Land: 23.26 sq mi (60.24 km^{2})
  - Water: 0.042 sq mi (0.11 km^{2})
- Elevation: 3 ft (0.91 m)

Population (2020)
  - Total: 143,507
  - Density: 6,170.1/sq mi (2,382.27/km^{2})
- Time zone: UTC−6 (CST)
  - Summer (DST): UTC−5 (CDT)
- ZIP Codes: 70001–70006, 70009–70011, 70033, 70055, 70060
- Area code: 504
- GNIS feature ID: 555301

Metairie (/ˈmɛtəri/ MET-ər-ee) is an unincorporated community and census-designated place (CDP) in Jefferson Parish, Louisiana, United States, and is part of the New Orleans metropolitan area. With a population of 143,507 in 2020, Metairie is the largest community in Jefferson Parish, the fifth-largest CDP in the United States, and the largest outside Clark County, Nevada. It is an unincorporated area that (as of 2020) would have been Louisiana's fourth-largest city behind Shreveport if incorporated.

== History ==
Métairie (French: [metɛʁi]) is the French term for a small tenant farm which paid the landlord with a share of the produce, a practice also known as sharecropping (in French, métayage). In the 1760s, many of the original French farmers were tenants; after the Civil War, the majority of the community's inhabitants were sharecroppers until urbanization started in the 1910s.

In the 1720s, French settlers became the first Europeans to settle Metairie in the area known then as Tchoupitoulas and now as Metairie Ridge, a natural levee formed by an ancient branch of the Mississippi River, Bayou Metairie, which flowed through modern-day River Ridge, Metairie, Gentilly, and New Orleans East. It emptied into Mississippi Sound. The Acolapissa Native Americans used this ridge as a road; it is the oldest road in the New Orleans area. An electric streetcar was installed running along the road in the late 1910s, opening the area to greater development. Upscale housing tracts were constructed off the road in the 1920s; this area is now known as "Old Metairie".

The 1947 Fort Lauderdale hurricane, with winds of 125 mph (201 km/h), directly hit Metairie. Much of the community was under 6 feet (1.8 m) of water.

Hurricane Betsy, a Category 3 storm, hit the area in 1965, causing extensive wind damage and moderate flooding. Thirty years later, the May 8, 1995 Louisiana flood, which dumped upwards of 20 inches (510 mm) of rain on Metairie in a twelve-hour period, also flooded some parts of the region, especially areas south and west of Metairie, including Kenner, Harahan, and River Ridge.

In 1989, a Metairie district elected white supremacist David Duke to the Louisiana state legislature for a single term.

On August 29, 2005, Hurricane Katrina caused a new migration from Orleans Parish, because housing was needed to replace what had been destroyed in the flooding of the city.

Veterans Boulevard was laid out alongside a drainage canal, and became a commercial center of the region. The central business district of Metairie is located on Causeway Boulevard near Lake Pontchartrain. In the 1970s and early 1980s, an area of bars and nightclubs opened in a section of Metairie known as "Fat City". Several New Orleans radio and television stations have also established transmitter facilities in Metairie and Jefferson Parish; two of them, WGNO-TV and WNOL, now have studios and main offices in Metairie.

== Geography ==
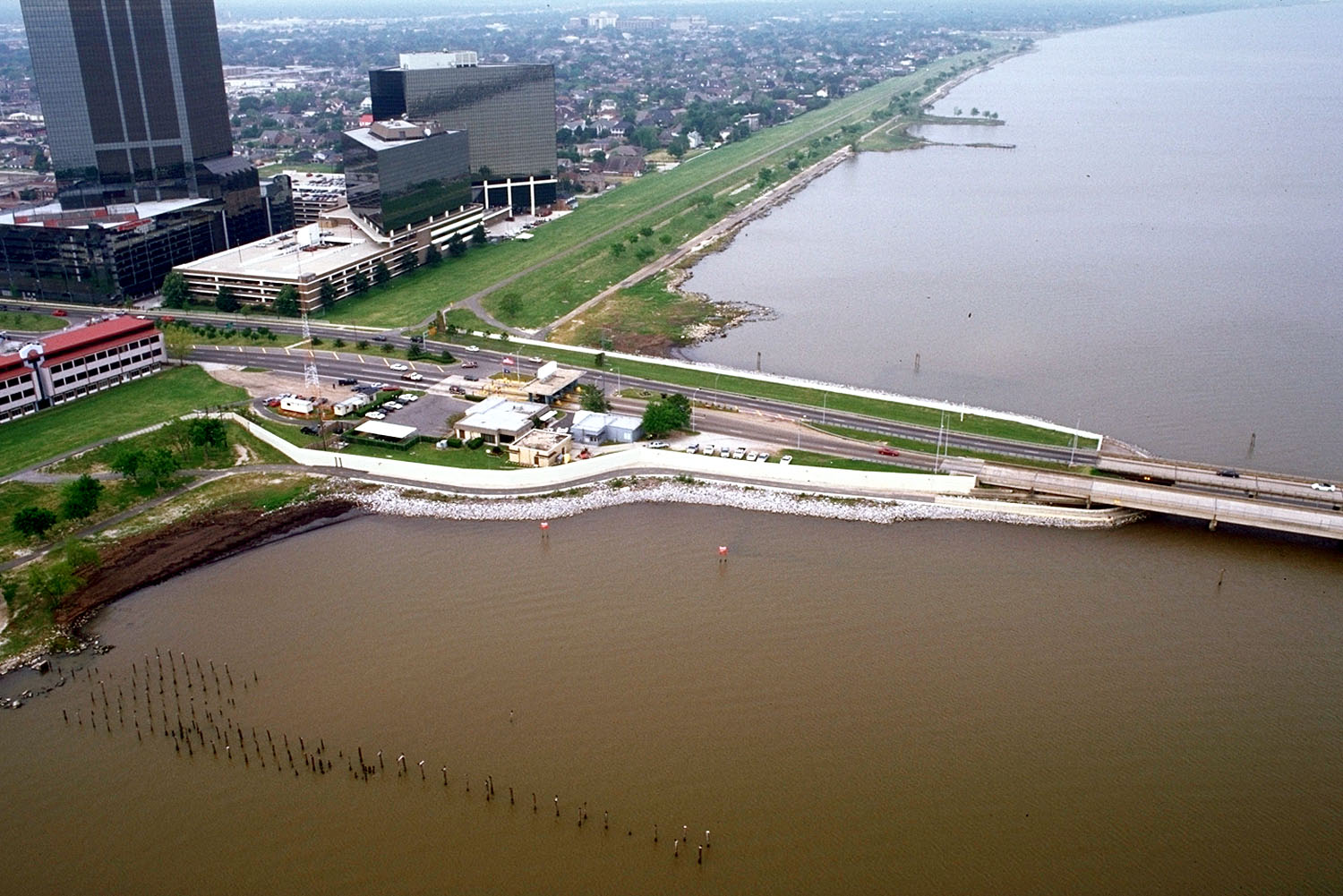
Lake Pontchartrain Causeway at South Shore

Metairie is located in eastern Jefferson Parish and is bordered by New Orleans to the east, Kenner to the west, Lake Pontchartrain to the north, and the Illinois Central Railroad tracks to the south. South of the railroad are River Ridge, Harahan, Elmwood, and Jefferson. The 17th Street Canal forms the border between Metairie and New Orleans to the east. It is a principal community in Greater New Orleans. According to the U.S. Census Bureau, the Metairie CDP has a total area of 23.2 square miles (60.2 km^{2}), of which 23.2 square miles (60.1 km^{2}) is land and 0.04 square miles (0.1 km^{2}), or 0.18%, is water.

=== Climate ===
The climate of Metairie has been classified as humid subtropical. Like the city of New Orleans, it has short, generally mild winters and hot, humid summers. The average precipitation is 62.5 in (1,590 mm) annually; the summer months are the wettest, while October is the driest month. Precipitation in winter usually accompanies the passing of a cold front. On average, there are 77 days of 90 °F (32 °C) or greater highs, 8.1 days per winter where the high does not exceed 50 °F (10 °C), and 8.0 nights with freezing lows annually. It is rare for the temperature to reach 20 or 100 °F (−6.7 or 37.8 °C), with the last occurrence of each being February 5, 1996, and June 26, 2016, respectively.

Climate data for Metairie, Louisiana
Month	Jan	Feb	Mar	Apr	May	Jun	Jul	Aug	Sep	Oct	Nov	Dec	Year
Record high °F (°C)	82 (28)	85 (29)	88 (31)	93 (34)	96 (36)	99 (37)	101 (38)	103 (39)	101 (38)	97 (36)	87 (31)	84 (29)	103 (39)
Mean daily maximum °F (°C)	63 (17)	66 (19)	73 (23)	79 (26)	85 (29)	90 (32)	92 (33)	92 (33)	88 (31)	81 (27)	72 (22)	65 (18)	79 (26)
Mean daily minimum °F (°C)	45 (7)	48 (9)	55 (13)	60 (16)	68 (20)	73 (23)	75 (24)	75 (24)	72 (22)	62 (17)	54 (12)	48 (9)	61 (16)
Record low °F (°C)	16 (−9)	20 (−7)	28 (−2)	37 (3)	51 (11)	54 (12)	64 (18)	64 (18)	—	—	—	—	16 (−9)

== Demographics ==
Historical population
Census	Pop.	Note	%±
1970	136,477		—
1980	164,160		20.3%
1990	149,428		−9.0%
2000	146,136		−2.2%
2010	138,481		−5.2%
2020	143,507		3.6%
U.S. Decennial Census; 1960 1970 1980; 1990 2000 2010 2020

Metairie first appeared as an unincorporated community in the 1970 U.S. census; and as a census designated place in the 1980 United States census.

Metairie CDP, Louisiana – Racial and ethnic composition Note: the U.S. Census Bureau treats Hispanic/Latino as an ethnic category. This table excludes Latinos from the racial categories and assigns them to a separate category. Hispanics/Latinos may be of any race.
Race / Ethnicity (NH = Non-Hispanic)	Pop 2000	Pop 2010	Pop 2020	% 2000	% 2010	% 2020
White alone (NH)	119,535	100,280	89,070	81.80%	72.41%	62.07%
Black or African American alone (NH)	9,860	14,020	15,827	6.75%	10.12%	11.03%
Native American or Alaska Native alone (NH)	336	294	247	0.23%	0.21%	0.17%
Asian alone (NH)	4,002	4,458	5,474	2.74%	3.22%	3.81%
Native Hawaiian or Pacific Islander alone (NH)	31	39	24	0.02%	0.03%	0.02%
Other race alone (NH)	129	372	817	0.09%	0.27%	0.57%
Mixed race or Multiracial (NH)	1,648	1,571	4,604	1.13%	1.13%	3.21%
Hispanic or Latino (any race)	10,595	17,447	27,444	7.25%	12.60%	19.12%
Total	146,136	138,481	143,507	100.00%	100.00%	100.00%

According to the 2019 American Community Survey, there were 130,427 people living in the census-designated place. At the 2010 United States census, there were 138,481 people living in Metairie. The 2020 census reported 143,507 people living in the CDP. As of 2019, population density was 5,607.7 people per square mile, with a median age of 40.6.

At the 2019 American Community Survey, the racial and ethnic makeup was 69% non-Hispanic white, 10% Black and African American, 4% Asian, 1% multiracial, and 16% Hispanic and Latino American. According to 2017 census estimates, the racial makeup of Metairie was 67.5% White, 16.2% Hispanic or Latino American of any race, 9.9% Black and African American, 3.9% Asian, 0.7% from other races, 0.9% from two or more races, and 0.1% Native American. By the time of the 2020 census, its racial and ethnic makeup was 62.89% non-Hispanic white, 10.98% Black or African American, 0.49% Native American, 3.73% Asian, 0.02% Pacific Islander, 18.20% two or more races, and 18.42% Hispanic or Latino American of any race.

Among the population of Metairie, 52% were female in 2019. There were 56,421 households with an average of 2.63 persons per household. An estimated 52% of households were married couples living together, 23% non-family, 18% female householder with no male present, and 7% male householder with no female present. Approximately 61,354 housing units were in the community, and 92% were occupied; 59% of housing units were owner-occupied, and 64% of housing units were single unit structures. The median value of owner-occupied housing units was $246,600, and the median household income was $60,404. Residents had a per capita income of $35,007 at the 2019 American Community Survey.

=== Religion ===
In Metairie, an estimated 54.1% of adult residents identified with some religion as of 2019. Due to Spanish and French colonial influence, Metairie and the surrounding area have an overwhelmingly Catholic populace. Approximately 34.6% identified with the Catholic Church, served by the Roman Catholic Archdiocese of New Orleans; 5.9% were Baptist, 3.1% Pentecostal, 1.4% Methodist, 0.6% Lutheran, 0.6% Latter-Day Saints, 0.5% Anglican, and 0.5% from another Christian group including the Metropolitan Community Church among others.

At this survey, approximately 0.7% were Muslims and 0.4% identified with an Eastern religion such as Hinduism, Buddhism, or Sikhism; 0.6% of the community claimed affiliation with Judaism. Metairie is home to Congregation Gates of Prayer, a Reform synagogue, and beside it is Congregation Beth Israel, the oldest Orthodox congregation in the New Orleans metro area. Beth Israel constructed its new building in Metairie in 2012, several years after its building in Lakeview, New Orleans was destroyed by Hurricane Katrina.

== Arts and culture ==
=== Public libraries ===
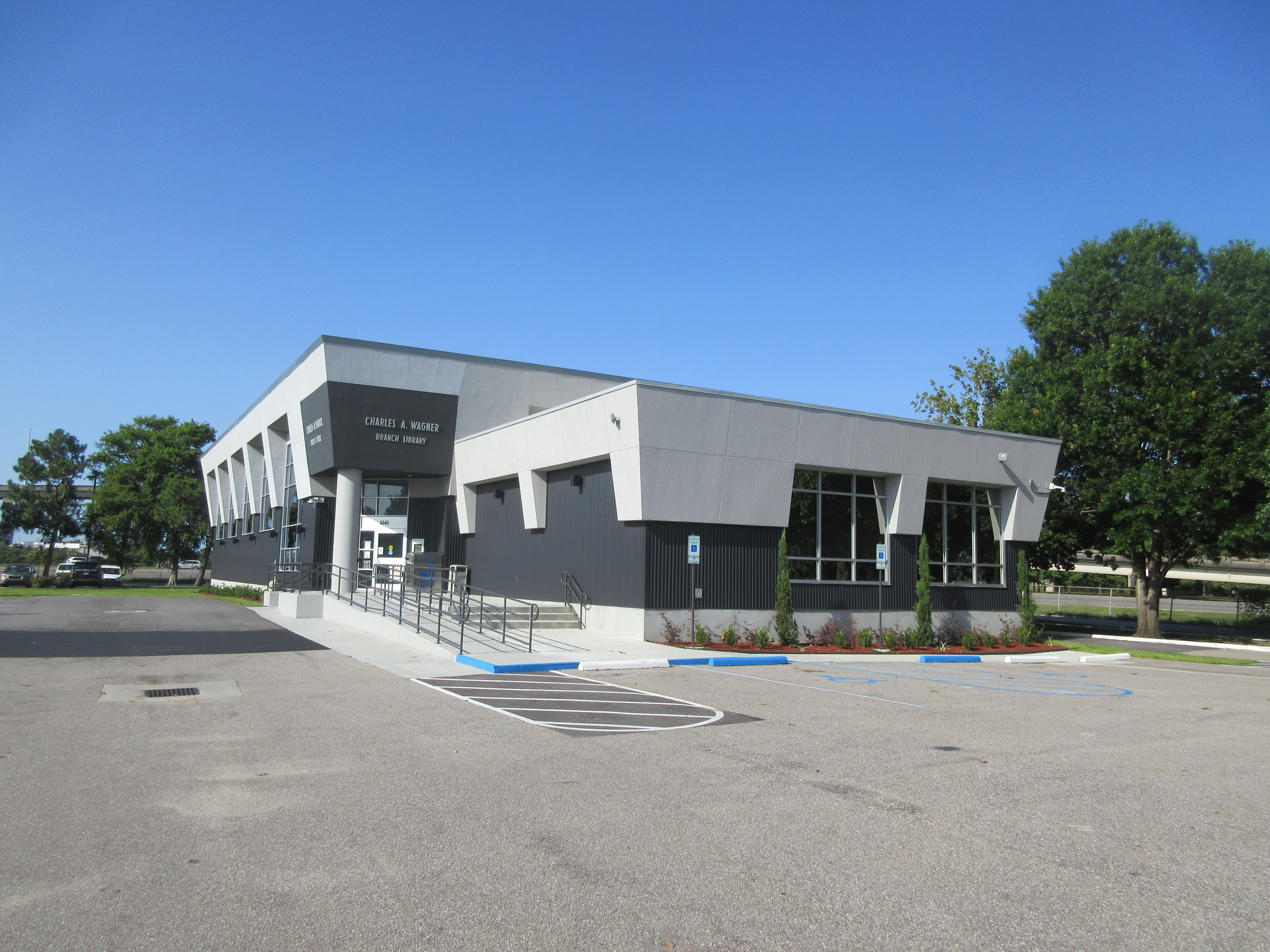
Wagner Branch Library

Jefferson Parish Library operates public libraries. The East Bank Regional Library, which houses the library system's headquarters, is in Metairie. Other public libraries in Metairie include the Lakeshore Library, the Old Metairie Library, and the Wagner Library.

=== Tallest buildings ===
Three Lakeway Center is 403 feet (123 m), and is the tallest building in Louisiana outside of New Orleans and Baton Rouge. The Galleria is 269 feet (82 m).

== Sports ==
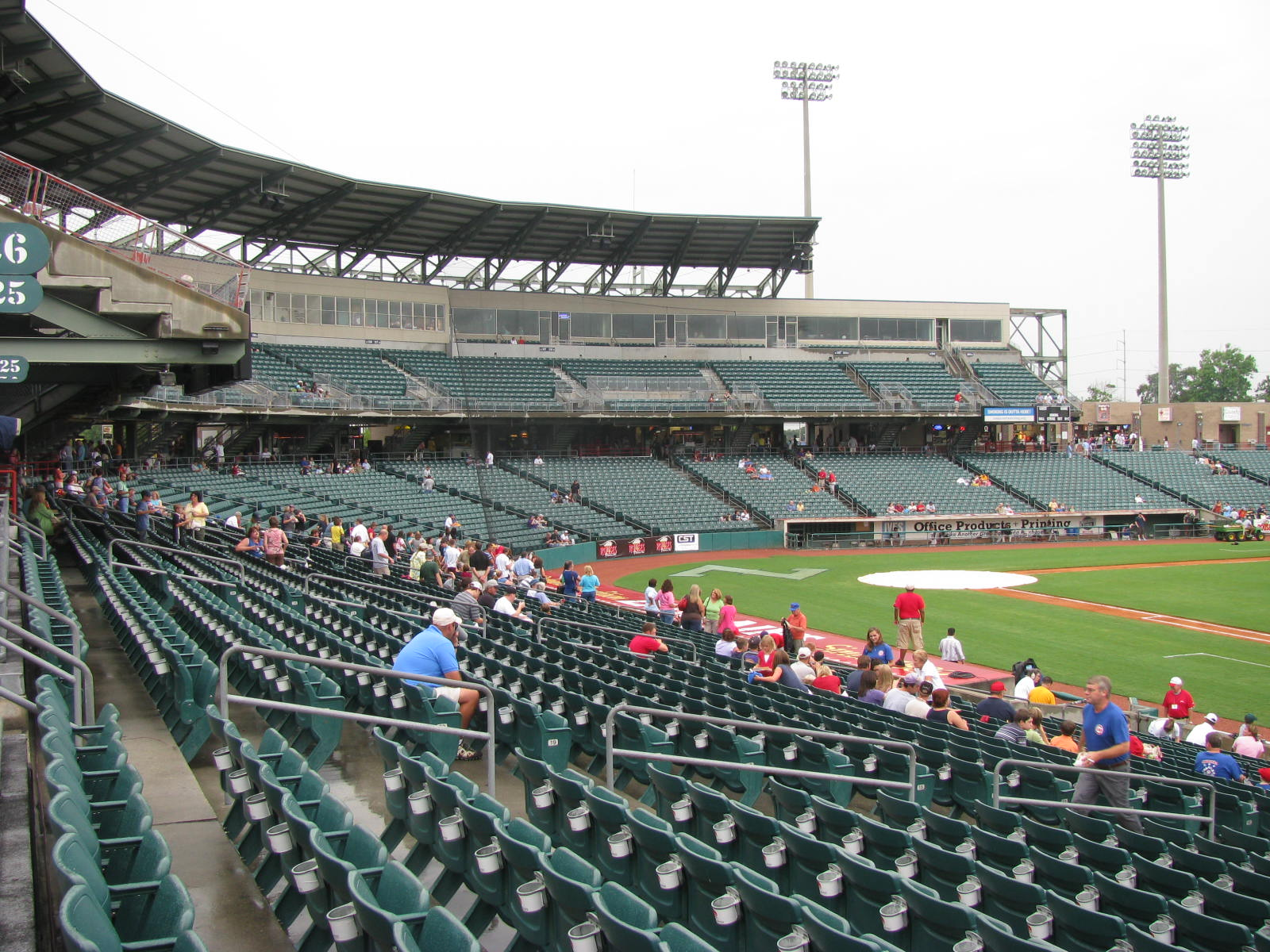
Shrine on Airline

Metairie was home to the New Orleans Baby Cakes Triple-A Minor League Baseball team of the Pacific Coast League from 1993 to 2019. The minor league club played its home games at Privateer Park, home to the University of New Orleans's NCAA baseball team, from 1992 through 1996, and at Shrine on Airline from 1997 to 2019.

The training facilities of NFL franchise New Orleans Saints and the NBA franchise New Orleans Pelicans are located in Metairie. As such, many players reside in the area.

Boxing cards have been held in the Copeland Tower Suites (formerly Landmark Hotel).

Beginning in 2020, the New Orleans Gold of Major League Rugby play their homes games in Metairie at the Gold Mine on Airline.

== Parks and recreation ==
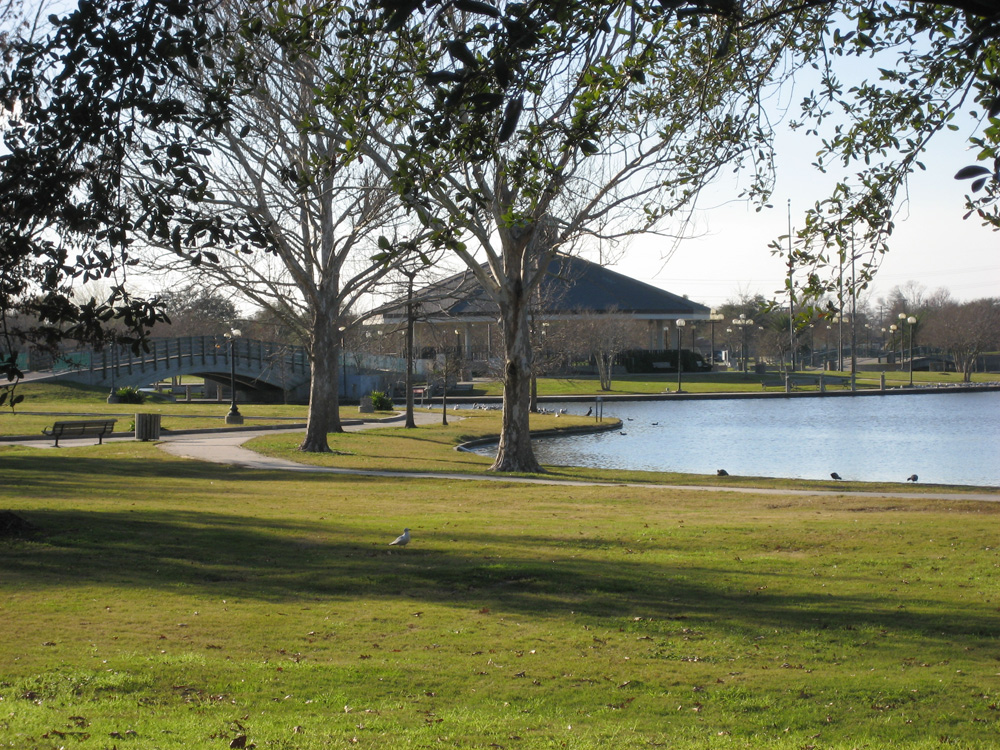
Lafreniere Park

Notable parks include Lafreniere Park and Pontiff Playground.

== Education ==
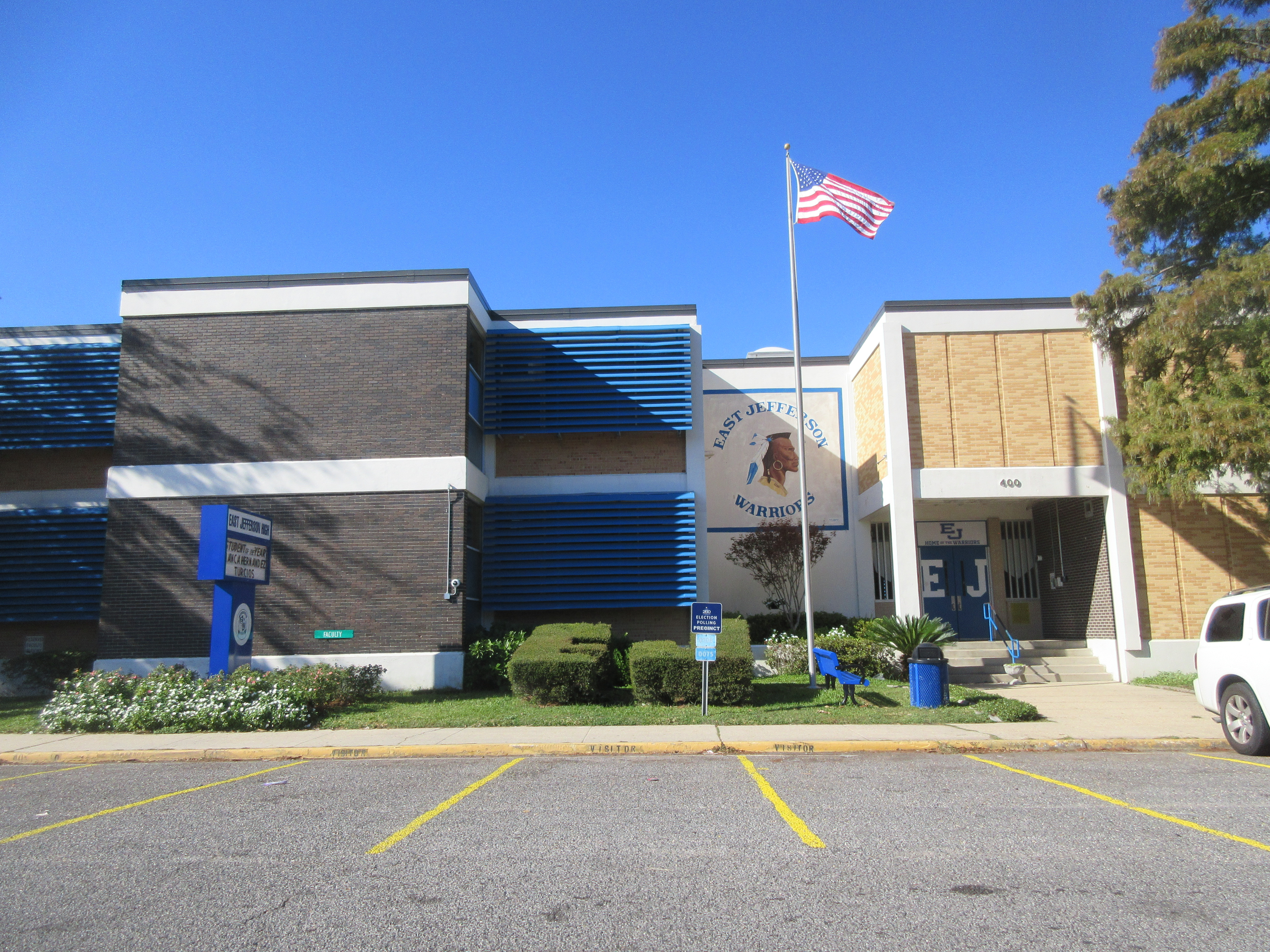
East Jefferson High School

Metairie's public schools are operated by the Jefferson Parish Public School System.

There is one zoned public high school in Metairie: East Jefferson High School. Additionally, many residents are zoned to Alfred Bonnabel High School in Kenner and Riverdale High School in Jefferson.

Previously, some residents were zoned to Grace King High School in Metairie. Grace King High School closed in 2023.

=== Magnet public schools ===
- Haynes Academy for Advanced Studies

=== Private schools ===
- Archbishop Chapelle High School
- Archbishop Rummel High School
- Crescent City Christian School
- Metairie Park Country Day School
- Ridgewood Preparatory School-closed 2023
- St. Martin's Episcopal School
- Ecole Classique

== Infrastructure ==
=== Transportation ===
Mass transit is provided by Jefferson Transit.

Major roads include Interstate 10, Veterans Memorial Boulevard , Earhart Expressway and Airline Highway/ U.S. Route 61. The Lake Pontchartrain Causeway's southern terminus lies in Metairie.

== See also ==
- Metairie Cemetery - Located in New Orleans, east of Metairie
