= Jefferson Parish Library =

Library system in Louisiana, United States

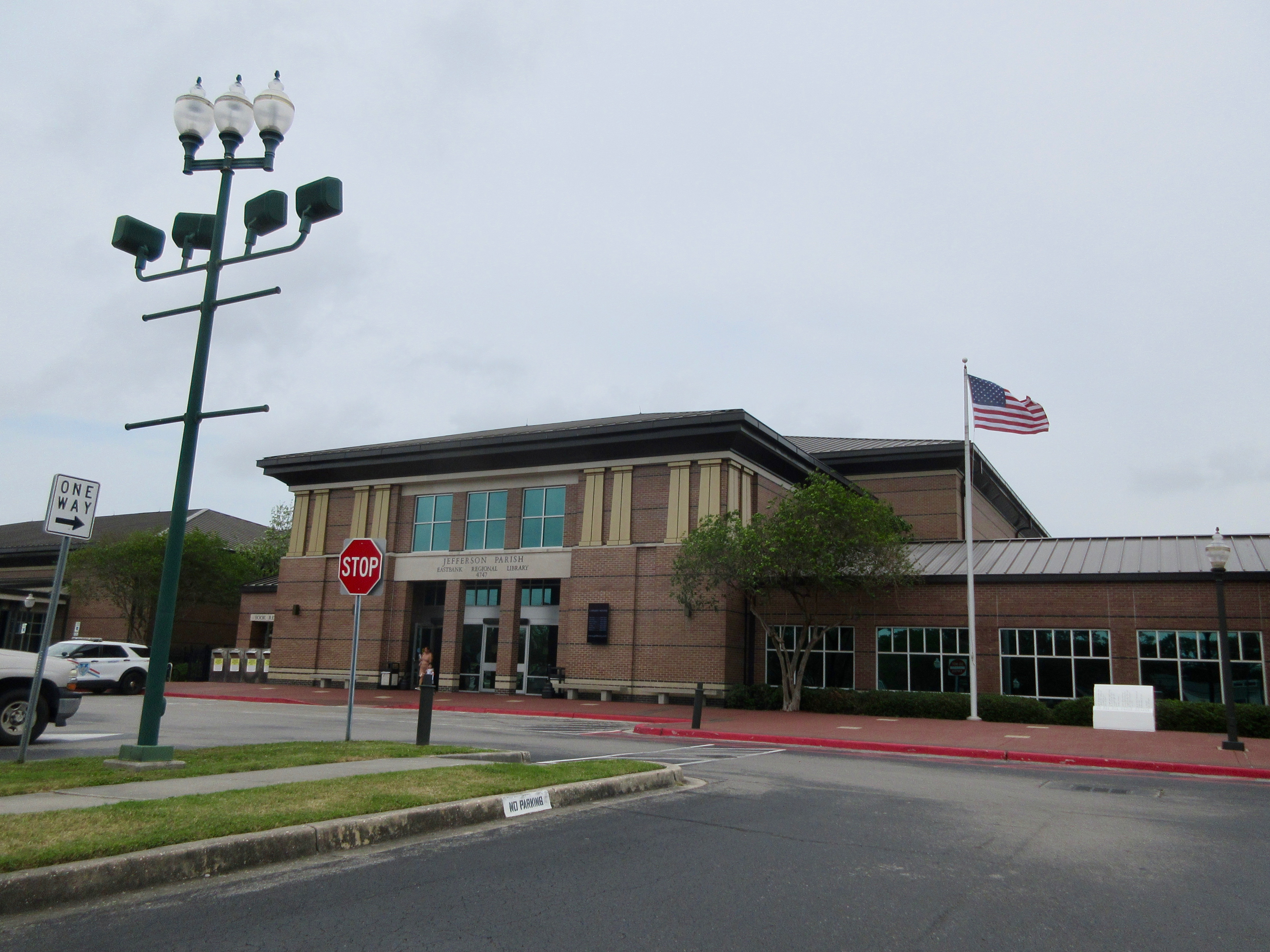
Eastbank Regional Library in Metairie, Louisiana.

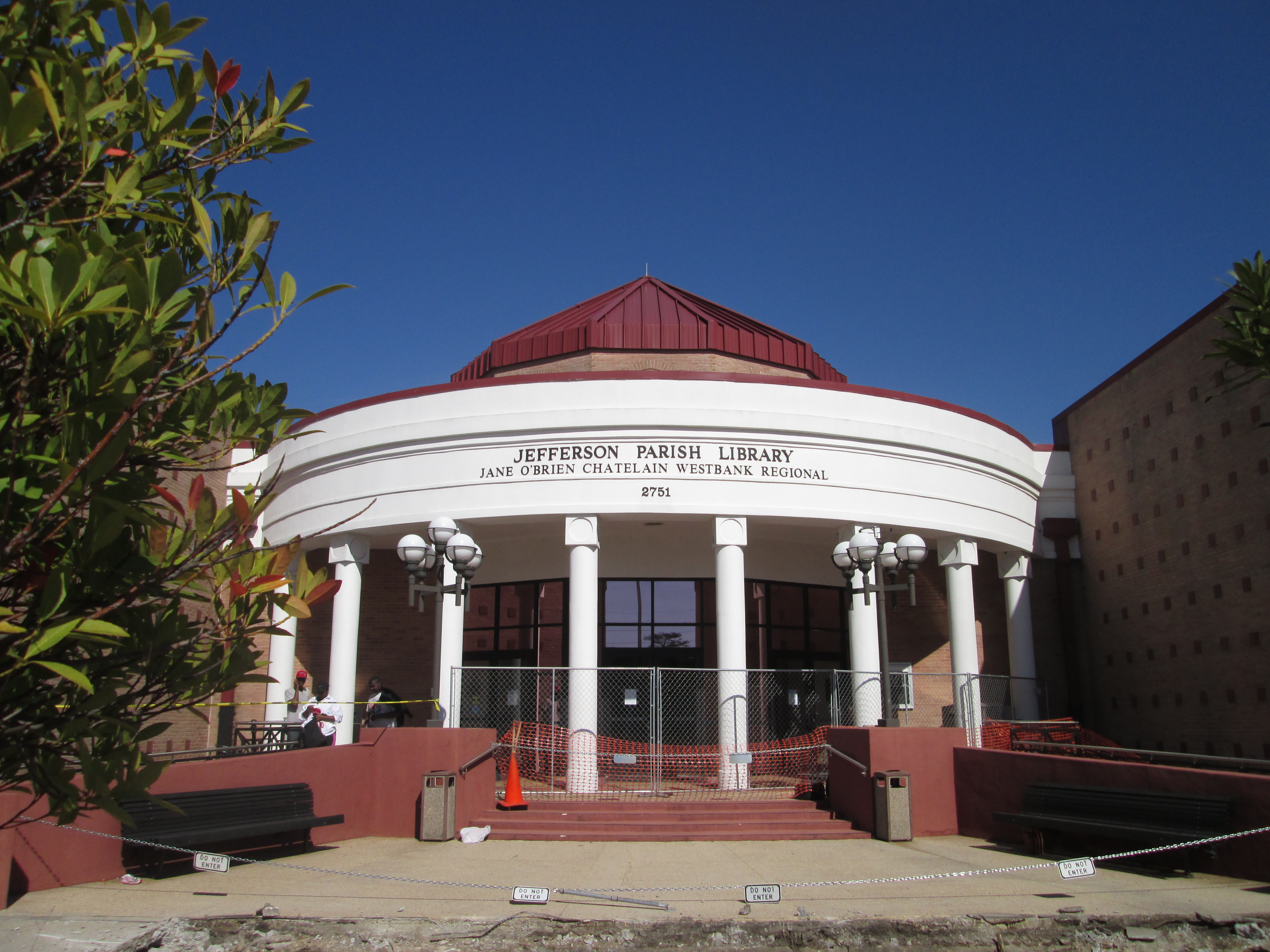
Jane O'Brein Chatelein Westbank Regional Library in Harvey

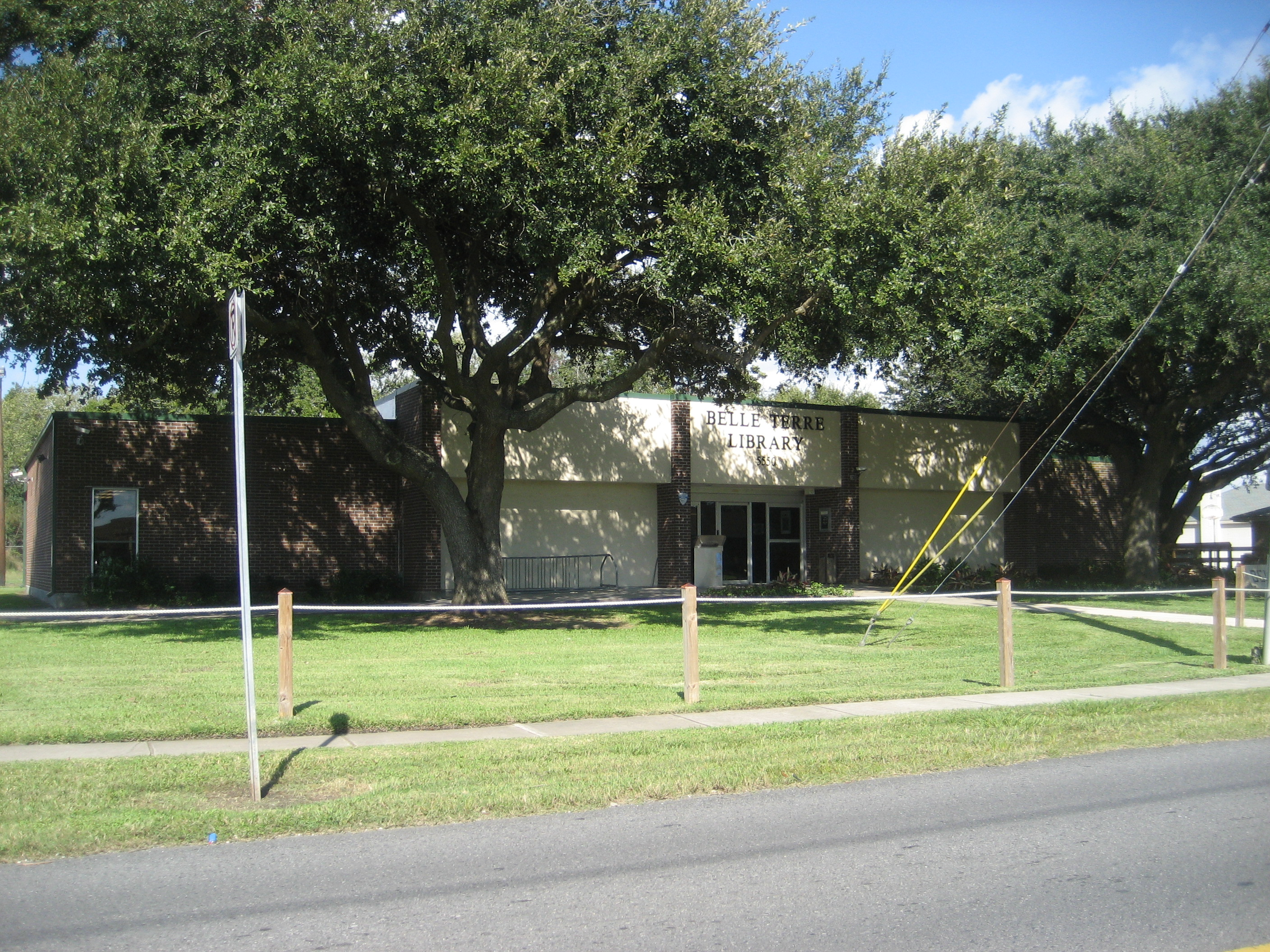
Belle Terre Library in Marrero

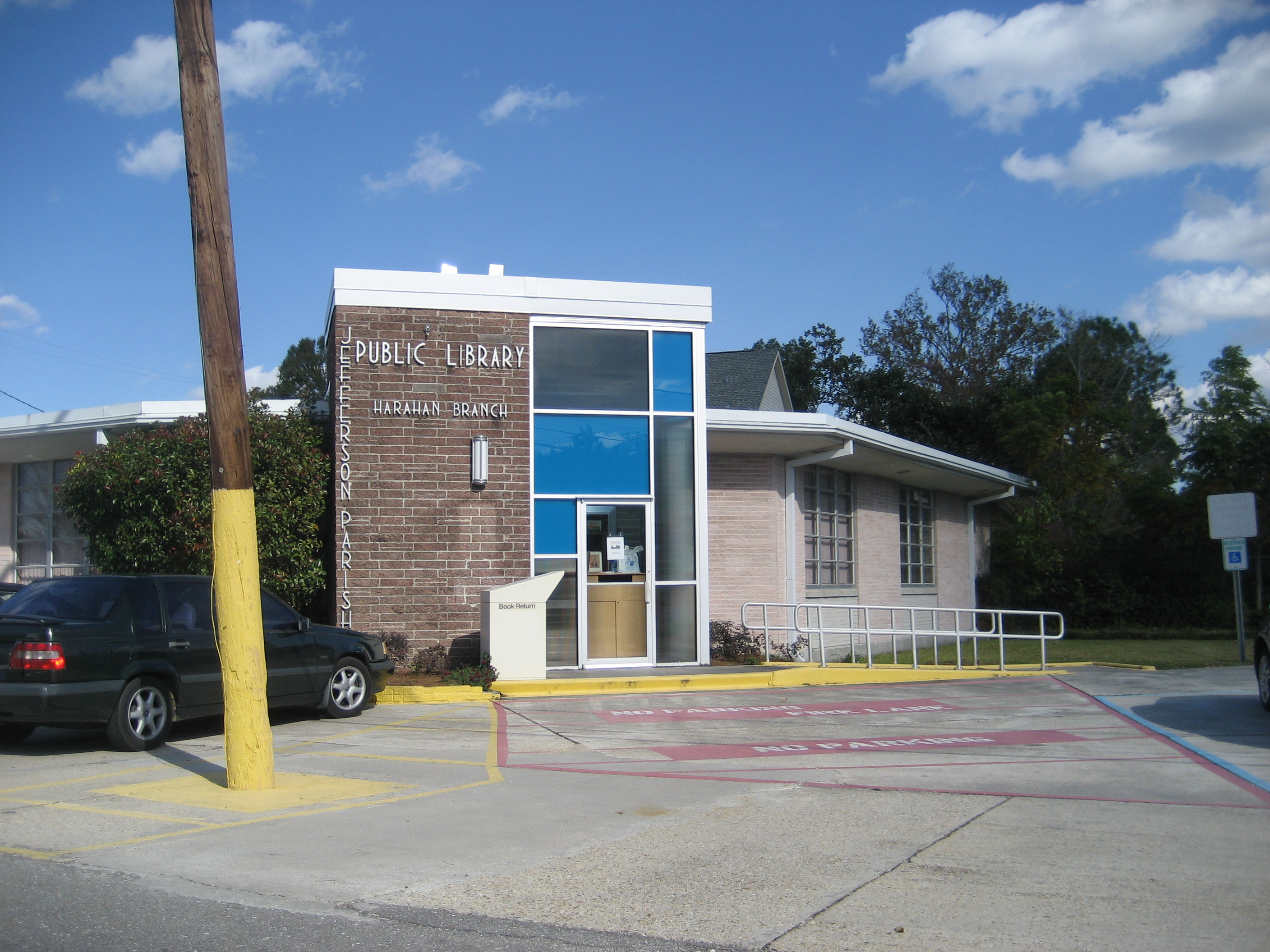
Harahan Library

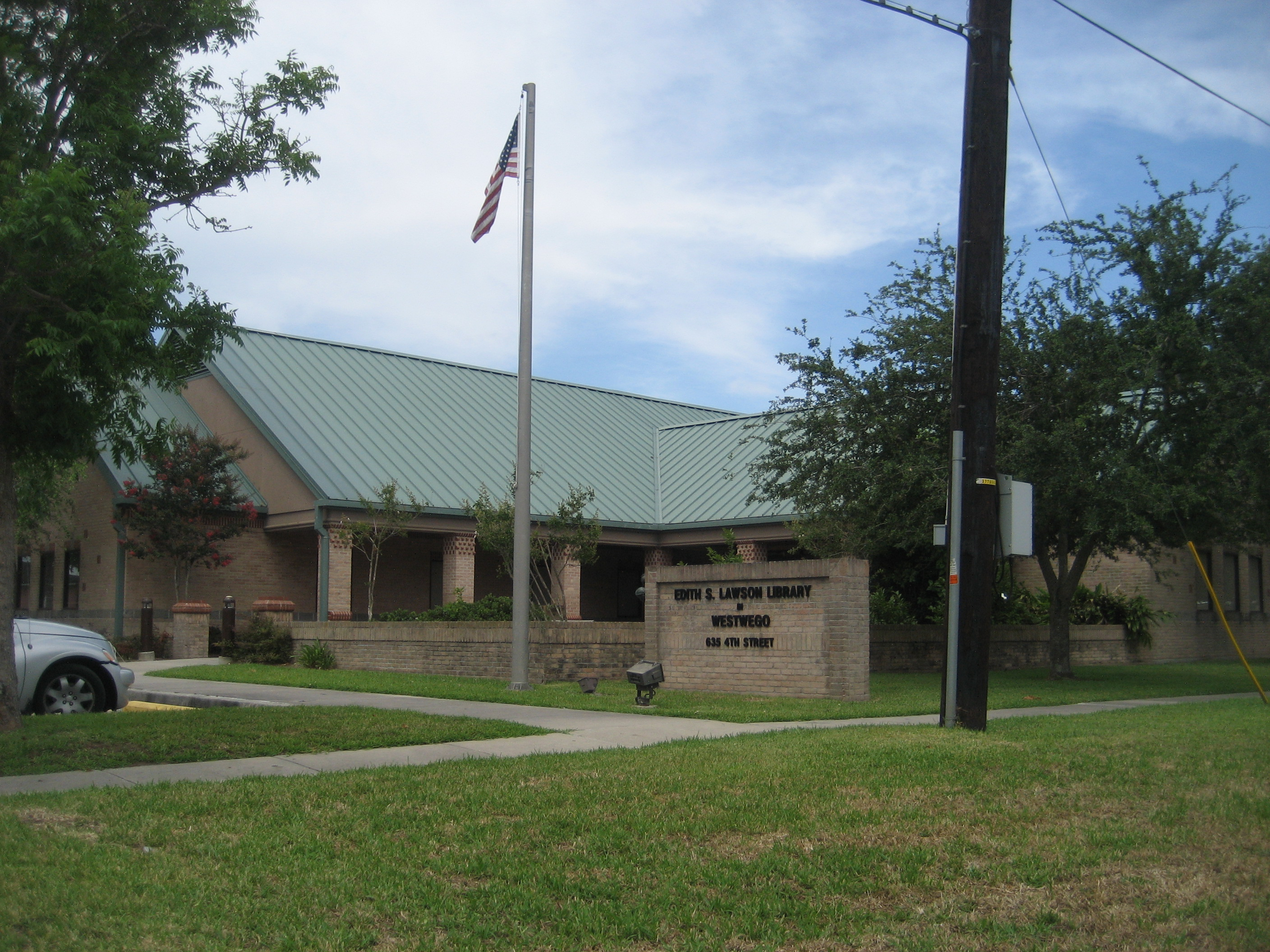
Edith S. Lawson Library in Westwego

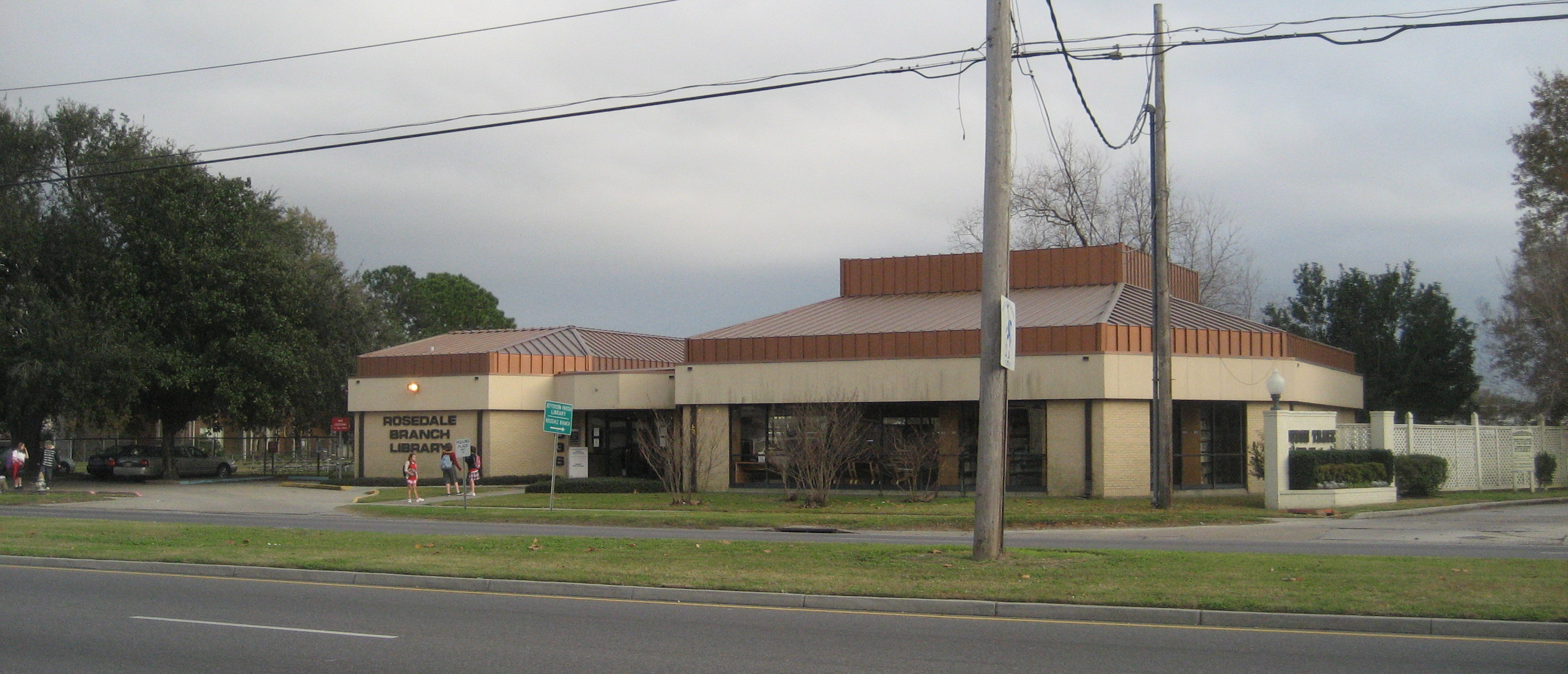
Rosedale Branch Library in Jefferson

Jefferson Parish Library (JPL) is the library system of Jefferson Parish, Louisiana. It has its headquarters in the East Bank Regional Library in Metairie, an unincorporated area in the parish.

== History ==
=== Background ===
Jefferson Parish is a long, narrow strip of land in southeastern Louisiana that stretches 60 miles, from the southern shore of Lake Pontchartrain to Grand Isle on the Gulf of Mexico. Adjacent to Orleans and Plaquemines Parishes on the east and St. Charles and Lafourche Parishes on the west, it was established on February 11, 1825, and named after President Thomas Jefferson, commemorating his role in the Louisiana Purchase of 1803.

=== Founding ===
The police jury of Jefferson Parish voted to approve the establishment of a public library on August 20, 1946, following a campaign by civic organizations including the Metairie Civic Council. The library system was formally inaugurated on November 30, 1949, with a ceremony at the Gretna High School auditorium, opening with approximately 16,500 books.

=== Early Expansion (1950s-1960s) ===
Branches were opened in major cities and towns, and by early 1950 the system comprised nine branches, representing the largest one-parish library demonstration program ever conducted by the Louisiana State Library. At first, none of the original library buildings were owned by the parish. The headquarters and Gretna Branch were originally co-located at 701–705 Second Street, Gretna, having moved from its original location at 337 Huey P. Long Street. The Gretna Branch moved to its current location in 1968. The Metairie, Jefferson, Kenner, Harahan, Marrero, Gretna, and Westwego branches were all opened in late 1949 and the one-room Grand Isle Branch opened in January 1950.

The Harahan Branch, initially housed in Harahan City Hall, opened in 1957 under librarian Celia Moore and is the oldest parish library in operation. The Wagner Branch, named for former Parish Librarian Charles A. Wagner, opened on February 6, 1964, at 6612 Kawanee Avenue in Bissonet Plaza with a collection of 15,000 books.

The new headquarters building at 3420 N. Causeway Boulevard was dedicated in 1967. Funded through a combination of a federal grant, parish funds, and a land donation from the Pontchartrain Levee District, the 30,000-square-foot structure was seven times larger than the previous Gretna headquarters and opened with 52,500 books in closed stacks. By this point Jefferson Parish had the highest per capita library expenditure ($5.54) among Louisiana parishes with a population exceeding 100,000, with the parish spending $156,222 on books in 1967 alone.

=== Outreach Services ===
A bookmobile furnished by the Louisiana State Library began parish-wide service in January 1950. By September 1952, the library operated three bookmobiles, for the East and West Banks and one dedicated to service for Black residents, serving 101 stops across the parish. This service continued until the late 1960s when the library began phasing out its five bookmobiles. The last two bookmobiles were replaced in 1986 by vans used by current outreach services, serving nursing homes, daycare centers, and qualified homebound individuals on both banks of the river.

=== Growth and New Buildings (1970s-1990s) ===
The Grand Isle Branch, destroyed by Hurricane Betsy in 1965, was subsequently rebuilt. The Terrytown Branch on the west bank opened on October 9, 1974, at Heritage Avenue and Concord Road, and was the largest library in the system until the Belle Terre Branch was built in 1981. The first Lafitte Branch, which had originally opened in the town firehouse, moved in 1982 to its present location on Highway 45.

The Rosedale Library on Jefferson Highway was completed in 1987. North Kenner Branch, opened in 1985, became the largest parish library, superseded only by the Old Metairie Branch, which was completed in 1988. The Live Oak Library, designed in the style of an Acadian-style cottage and set among a grove of century-old oak trees in Thomas Jefferson Park, opened in 1989 and was the first fully automated branch in the system. West Bank Regional was built and opened in 1990, upon the recommendations of HBW Associates of Dallas, a library consultant firm that did a detailed study of the library system in 1983.

The new Westwego Library opened in 1995, and is the largest branch on the west bank, and fourth largest in the library system. The Lakeshore Branch, located near historical Bucktown, was opened in 1995 as well. The new flagship library of the system is the new East Bank Regional, opened in 1997 with 100,000 feet of public space and a collection of 300,000 volumes.

The Marrero Branch, in a rented building on the west bank and which was recommended for closing by the 1983 library study, closed in 1997. In 1997, when library administration attempted to close the Kenner Library, housed in a small storefront on Williams Boulevard, it was opposed by members of the Jefferson Parish Council. The Kenner Library closed August 1, 1998.

The library's catalog and many other internet functions were automated in the late 1980s, and the branches first went on-line in 1990. Public microcomputers were also added for public use in the 1990s.

=== Hurricane Damage and Recovery ===
Hurricane Katrina and Hurricane Rita in 2005, and Hurricane Gustav in 2008, extensively damaged the Jefferson Parish Library System. Of the system's 15 branches, 14 sustained some degree of damage with four — Grand Isle, Gretna, Lafitte, and Lakeshore — completely destroyed and requiring full reconstruction.

- Belle Terre Library: Hurricane Katrina damaged more than 50% of the library, requiring extensive renovations.
- East Bank Regional Library: Minor water damage and wind damage on roof from Hurricane Katrina.
- Grand Isle Library: Severe damage from Hurricanes Katrina and Gustav, requiring it to be rebuilt.
- Gretna Library: Hurricanes Katrina and Gustav damaged 70% of the library, requiring it to be rebuilt.
- Harahan Library: Minor damage from Hurricane Katrina, requiring moderate restoration.
- Lafitte Library: Moderate damage from Hurricane Katrina but was badly damaged by Hurricane Rita, requiring it to be rebuilt.
- Lakeshore Library: Hurricane Katrina damaged 70% of the library, requiring it to be rebuilt.
- Live Oak Library: Hurricanes Katrina and Rita damaged 33% of the library, requiring extensive renovations.
- North Kenner Library: Some damage during Hurricane Katrina and damage to 33% of the library from Hurricane Rita, requiring extensive renovations.
- Old Metairie Library: Hurricane Katrina damaged 15% of the library, requiring modest restoration.
- Rosedale Library: Virtually no damage from Hurricanes Katrina and Rita.
- Terrytown Library: Hurricane Katrina damaged 20% of the library, requiring moderate restoration.
- Wagner Library: Hurricane Katrina damaged 40% of the library, requiring extensive renovations.
- West Bank Regional Library: Hurricanes Katrina and Rita damaged 35% of the library, requiring extensive renovations.
- Westwego Library: Hurricane Katrina damaged 33% of the library, requiring extensive renovations.

== Branches ==
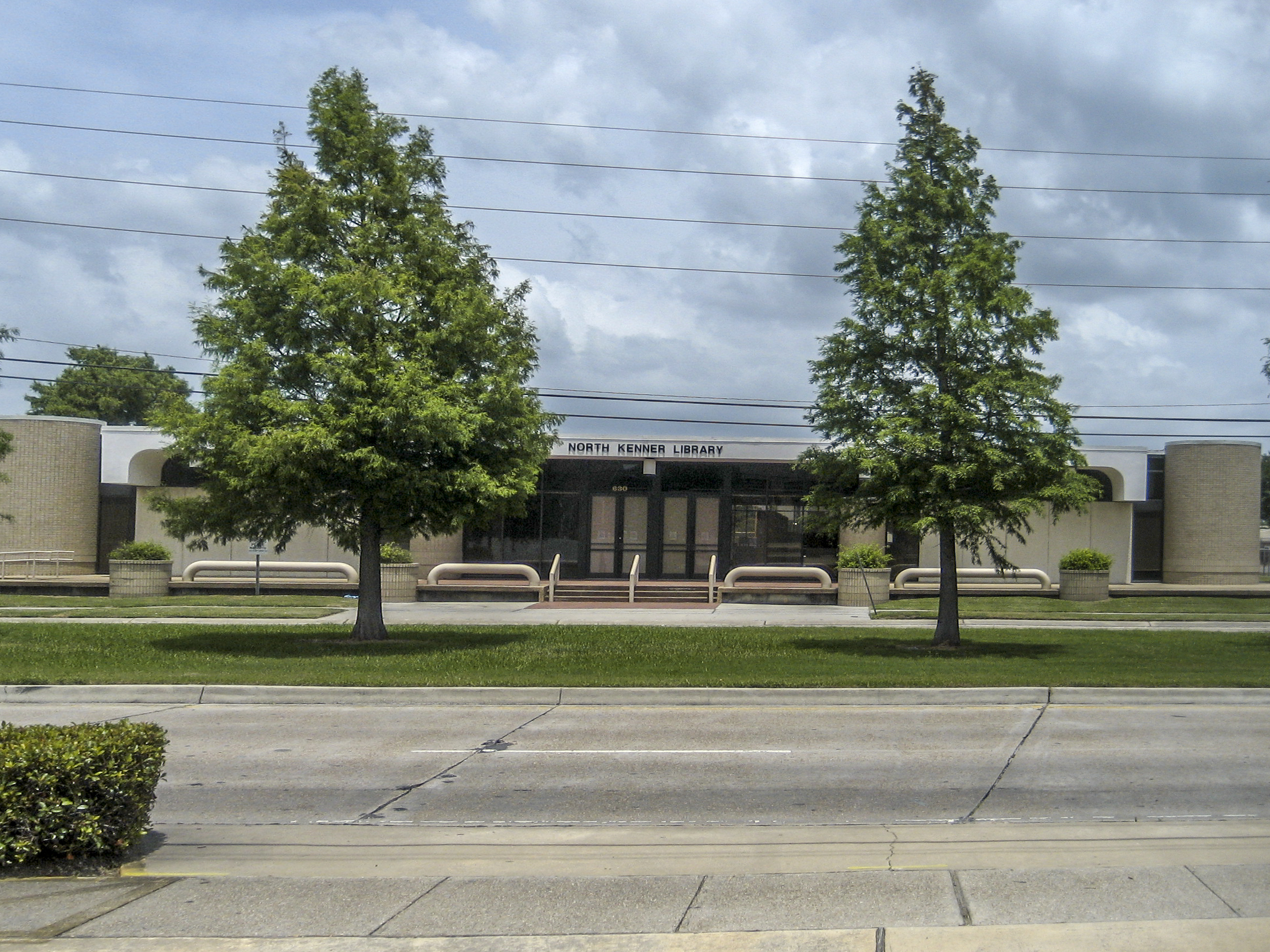
North Kenner Library

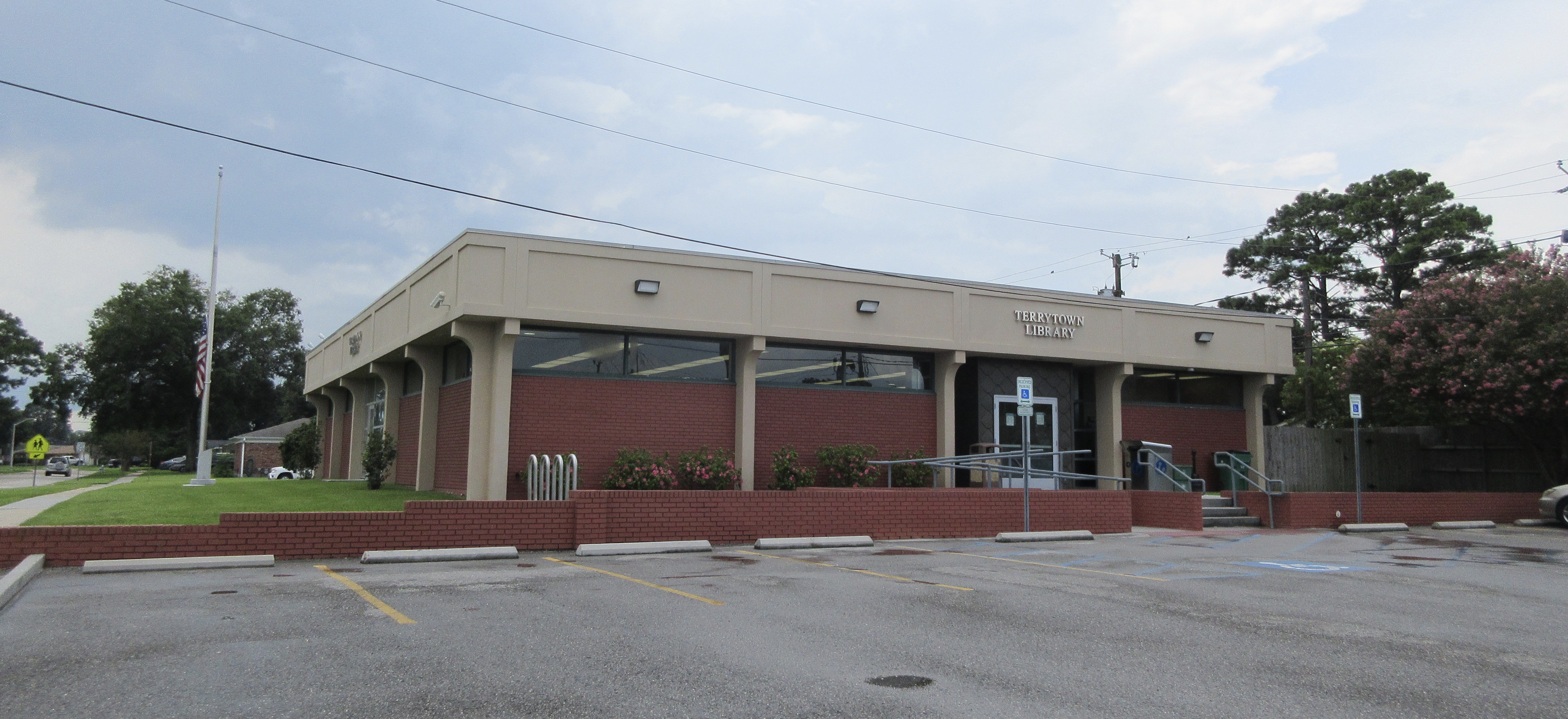
Terrytown Library

East Bank:

- East Bank Regional Library (Metairie, unincorporated area)
- Harahan Library (Harahan)
- Lakeshore Library (Metairie, unincorporated area)
- North Kenner Library (Kenner)
- Old Metairie Library (Metairie, unincorporated area)
- River Ridge (River Ridge, unincorporated area)
- Rosedale Library (Jefferson, unincorporated area)
- Wagner Library (Metairie, unincorporated area)

West Bank:

- Jane O'Brien Chatelain West Bank Regional Library (Harvey, unincorporated area)
- Belle Terre Library (Marrero, unincorporated area)
- Cybermobile at Grand Isle Library (Grand Isle)
- Gretna Library (Gretna)
- Lafitte Library (Jean Lafitte)
- Live Oak Library (Waggaman, unincorporated area)
- Terrytown Library (Terrytown, unincorporated area)
- Edith S. Lawson Library in Westwego (Westwego)
