= Grace King High School =

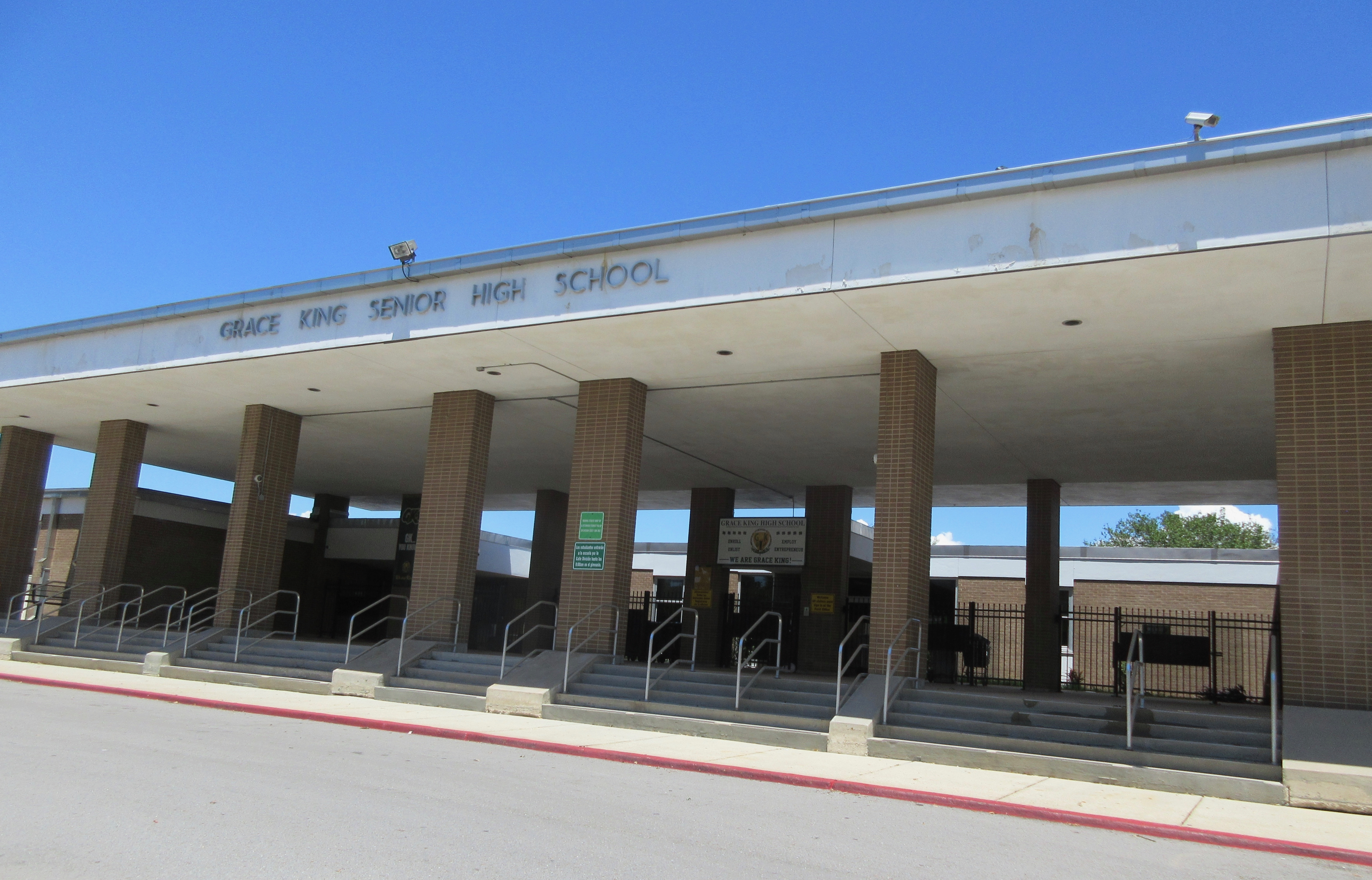
- Main entrance, 2023

Location
- 4301 Grace King Place; Metairie, Louisiana 70002; United States; 30°00′47″N 90°09′58″W

Information
- Type: Public
- Motto: Luck of the Irish
- Established: 1968
- Closed: 2023
- School district: Jefferson Parish Public Schools
- Superintendent: James Grey
- Principal: Gerod K Macon Sr
- Staff: 64.49 (FTE)
- Grades: 9–12
- Enrollment: 1,381 (2018-19)
- Student to teacher ratio: 21.41
- Colors: Hunter green, white, & gold
- Mascot: The Fighting Irish (Also known as Lucky)
- Website: king.jpschools.org

Grace King High School was a public high school located in Metairie, unincorporated Jefferson Parish, Louisiana, United States. It was a part of the Jefferson Parish Public Schools and served portions of Metairie and Kenner.

== History ==
Grace King was built in the late 1960s as a high school, opening its doors in 1968 as an all-girls public school serving Jefferson Parish; remaining such until the 1980s, when it became co-ed.

The school, which served Grades 9–12, was a part of the Jefferson Parish Public Schools system. The school served unincorporated portions of Jefferson Parish and a portion of the city of Kenner. The school was named for Grace King (d. 1932), a New Orleans writer and scholar of Louisiana history. The school's mascot was Lucky, the (Fighting Irish) Leprechaun, and the school colors were hunter green, white, and gold.

During Hurricane Katrina in late August 2005, the school suffered damage to its gymnasium's roof, and housed a National Guard troop until the school reopened in October 2005. Grace King High School recently completed building a minigolf course that is accessible to students who are confined to wheelchairs or crutches.

On May 24, 2023, Grace King High School permanently closed, with Haynes Academy now using the campus. The zoning boundary for King was divided between the boundaries of Alfred Bonnabel High School and Riverdale High School. The school community criticized the closure.

== Demographics ==
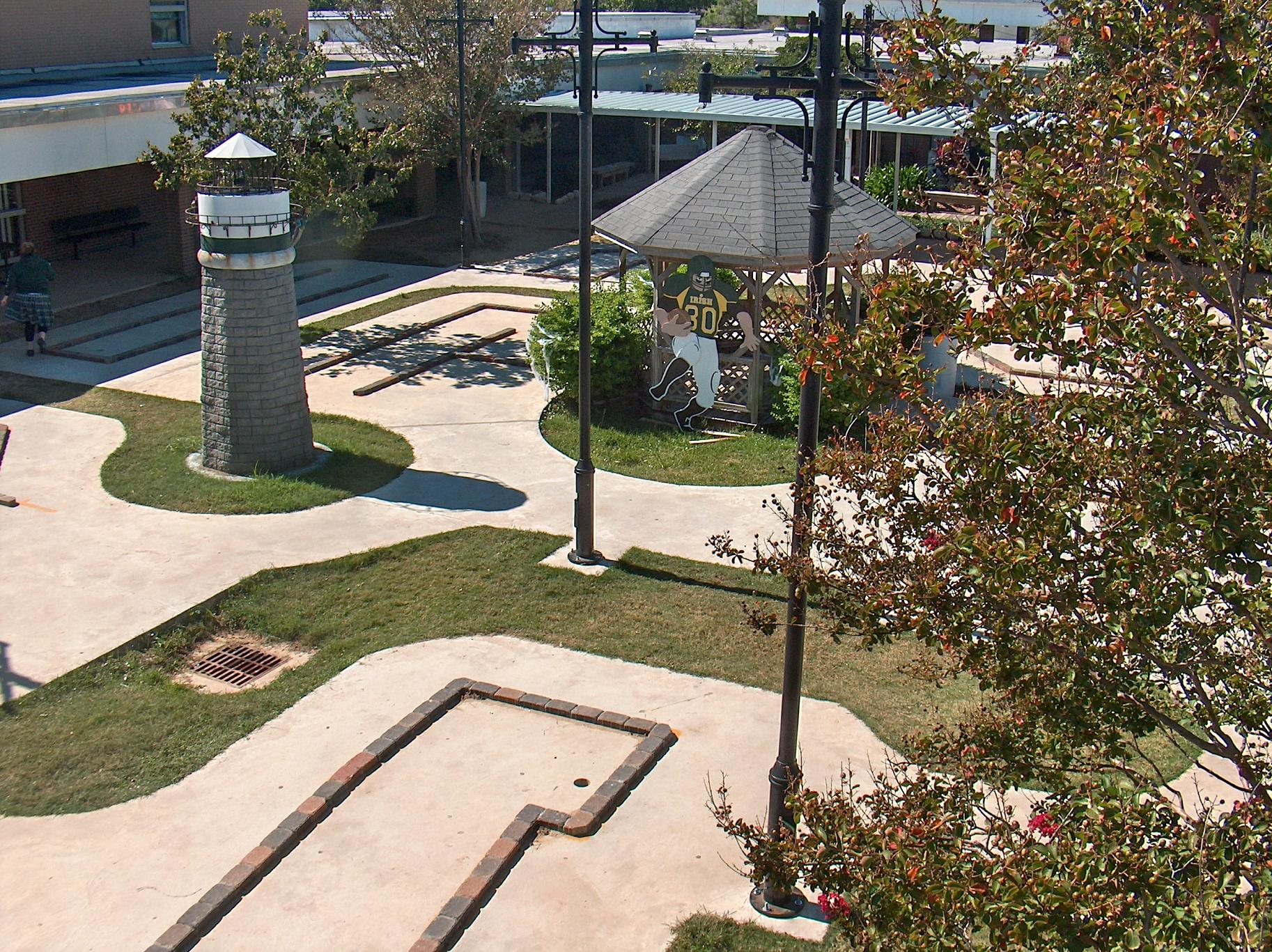
Grace King courtyard and putt-putt course

In May 2023, 64% of the students were Hispanic or Latino, 19% were non-Hispanic Black or African-American, and 12% were non-Hispanic White. There were 1,280 students total.

== Athletics ==
Grace King athletic teams participated as a member of the Louisiana High School Athletic Association (LHSAA). The school's athletic teams compete with eight additional teams classified at the Class 5A level, within District 8.

East Jefferson and Bonnabel High School were the Irish's biggest opponents.

== Notable alumni ==
- Pantera and Down vocalist Phil Anselmo, fronted the local heavy metal band Razor White. He later was the lead singer for Superjoint Ritual, and current lead guitarist in Arson Anthem.
- Donna Brazile, campaign manager for the Al Gore/Joe Lieberman presidential ticket in 2000, was the first African-American to direct a major presidential campaign.
- Ellen DeGeneres, television show host of The Ellen DeGeneres Show was a brief attendant.
- Trent Giambrone, who made his Major League Baseball debut with the Chicago Cubs on September 29, 2021.
- Danny Granger, former NBA forward for the Indiana Pacers, Los Angeles Clippers, and Miami Heat, was a 2001 graduate as a four-year letterman, averaging 24.3 ppg, 12 rpg and 5.5 bpg as a senior.
- Paul Hollis, member of the Louisiana House of Representatives from St. Tammany Parish, graduated in 1990 from Grace King and served as student body president.
- Salman Khan, founder of the Khan Academy, was valedictorian in 1994.
- Michael Lewis ("Beerman"), former San Francisco 49ers and New Orleans Saints wide receiver and kick returner.
- Kevin Mmahat, former MLB player (New York Yankees)
- Mark Mullins, trombonist for Harry Connick, Jr. and Bonerama, is a 1985 graduate.
- Candice Stewart, Miss Louisiana Teen USA in 2002, Miss Louisiana USA in 2005 and a contestant on Big Brother in 2013, is a graduate of the school.
