= Haynes Academy for Advanced Studies =

Location
- 4301 Grace King Pl (1416 Metairie Road until 2023); Metairie, LA 70002; United States; 30°00′48″N 90°09′58″W

Information
- School type: Magnet
- Established: 1909
- Founder: Jefferson Public School Board
- Status: Operating
- School district: Jefferson Parish School District
- Principal: Brent Vollenweider
- Staff: 31.00 (FTE)
- Grades: 6–12
- Enrollment: About 860 (2021-2022)
- Student to teacher ratio: 27.74
- Colors: Yellow and Black
- Athletics conference: LHSAA District 9-3A
- Mascot: Yellow Jackets
- Website: haynes.jpschools.org

Haynes Academy for Advanced Studies is a Magnet School in the Jefferson Parish School District. Haynes has been designated a Five Star School by the Louisiana Department of Education. The Haynes Academy is named after Vernon C. Haynes, a former principal of the school.

== History ==
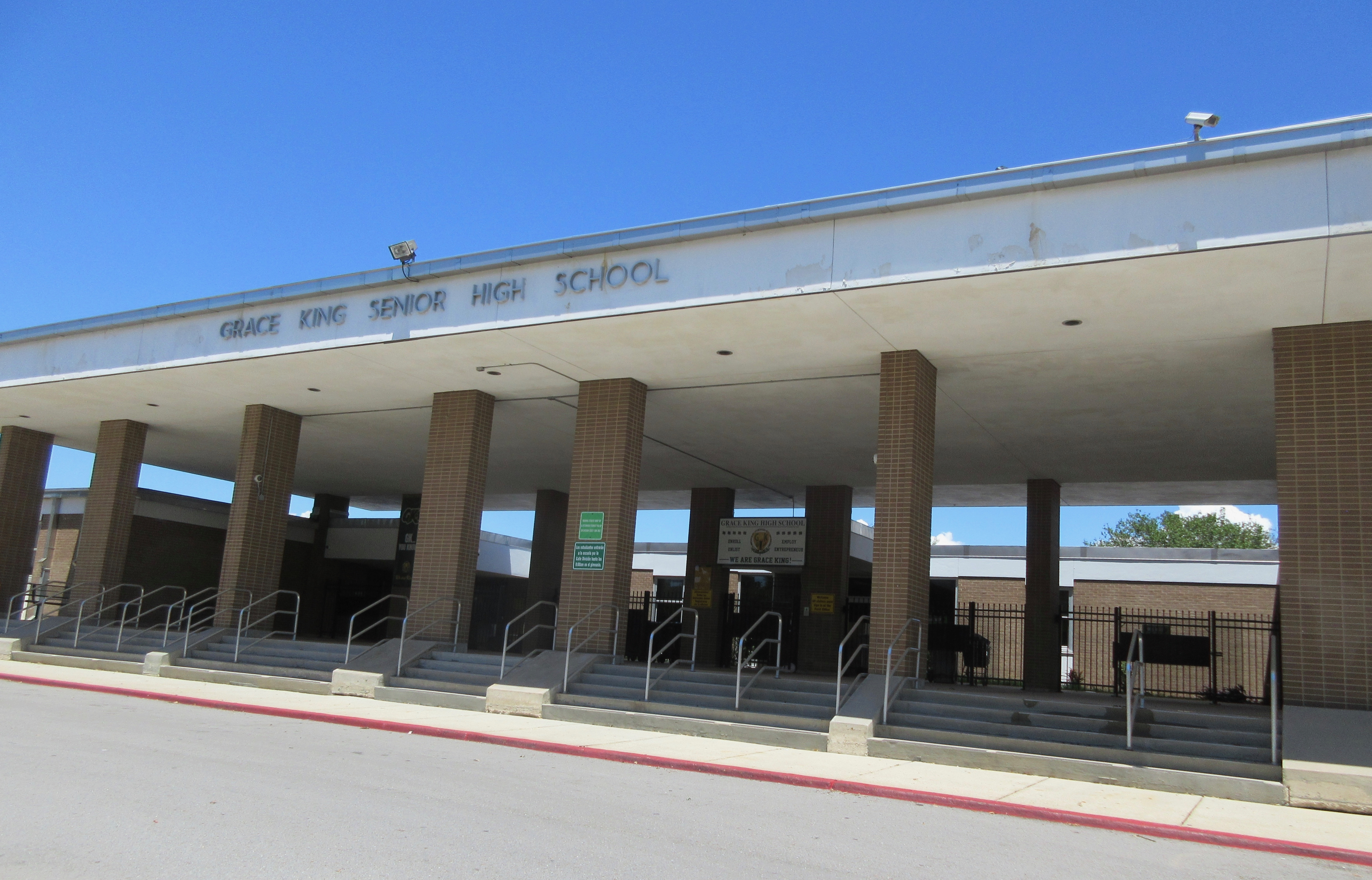
In 2023 the school moved into the former Grace King High School

Haynes Academy for Advanced Studies was established in 1909 by the Jefferson Parish School Board and named Metairie Ridge School. By 1912, the wood-framed, one-room schoolhouse had grown to an enrollment of 54. By 1929, grades 1 through 12 had been established and the school was renamed Metairie High School. After East Jefferson High opened in 1955, it was converted to a junior high school and Vernon C. Haynes became the principal.

During the 1968–69 school year, the two-story school building, which had been used for 44 years, was torn down and replaced with the present single-story building. In 1969, it became Metairie Middle School.

On November 22, 1974, the school's name was once again changed to the Vernon C. Haynes Middle School in honor of the former principal.

Haynes Middle School became Haynes Middle School for Advanced People in October 2004, and then became Haynes Academy for Advanced Studies in May 2006 after adding one high school grade each year. The class of 2010 was the first class to graduate from Haynes Academy for Advanced Studies.

In the 2023-2024 school year, the Jefferson Parish School system saw major changes such as the relocation of Haynes Academy for Advanced Studies students to the Grace King High School campus. The current campus is on Grace King Place. There is a proposal to rename Haynes after Grace King as "Haynes Academy for Advanced Studies at Grace King Place.

Though the school's name has changed many times throughout the years, the mascot has stayed the same. The Haynes Academy for Advanced Studies’ mascot is the Yellow Jacket (named Felix and Felicity).

== Athletics ==
Haynes Academy athletics competes in the LHSAA.

Haynes Academy offers boys football, basketball, baseball, wrestling, soccer, track, and cross country along with girls soccer, golf, swimming, track, softball, cheerleading, and basketball.

=== Championships ===
Volleyball State Champions- 2024/25

== Awards and achievements ==
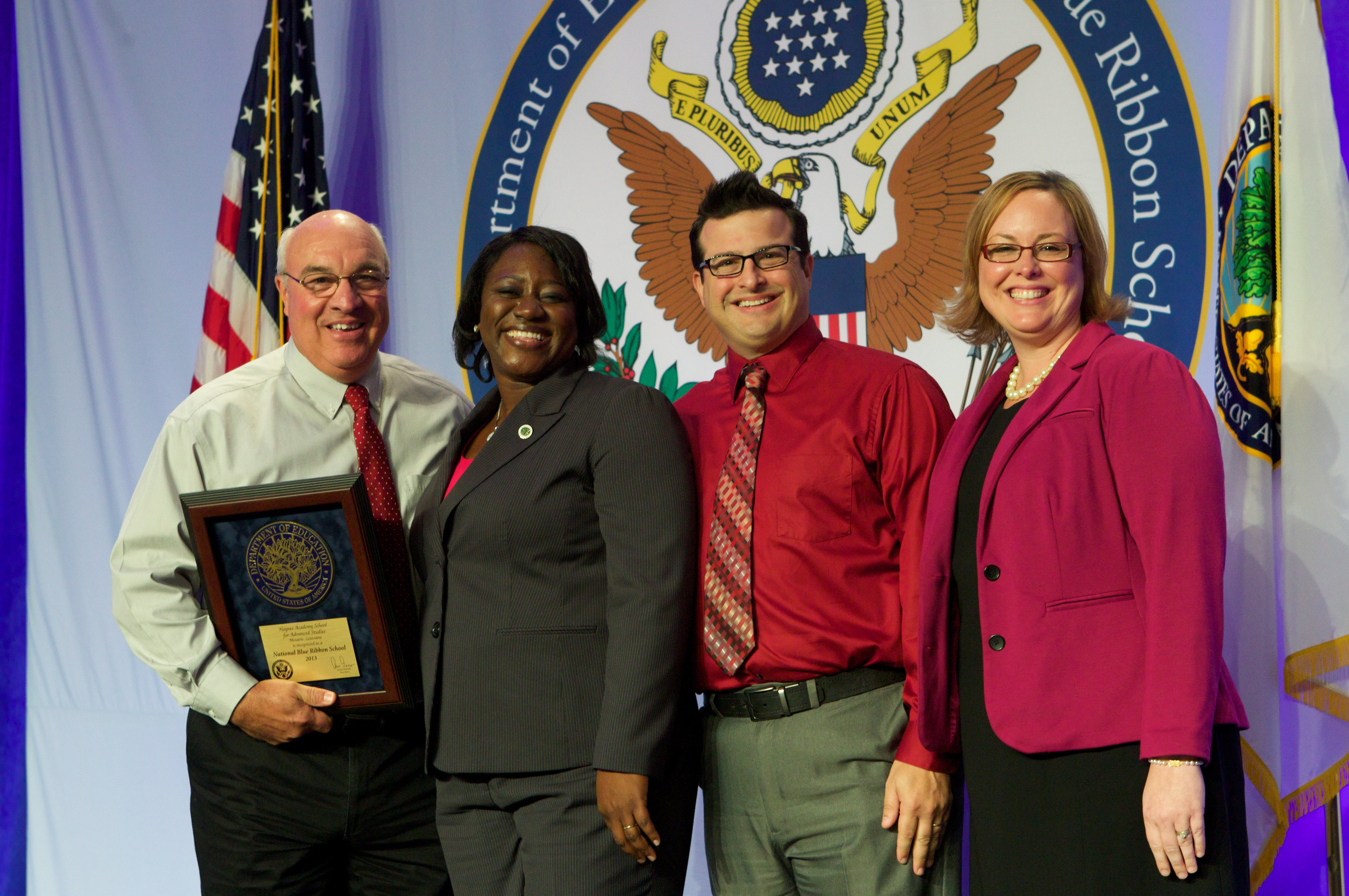
2013 National Blue Ribbon Schools winner

In January 2011, January 2012, January 2013, January 2014, January 2015, January 2016, January 2017, and January 2018 Haynes Academy won the state “We the People” championship. The “We the People: The Citizen and the Constitution” competition takes the form of simulated congressional hearings where groups of students testify as constitutional experts before panels of judges. The program began in 1987 and, since then, more than 30 million students and 90,000 teachers have participated.

In 2021, Haynes won the quiz bowl state championship.
