= List of schools in Jefferson Parish, Louisiana =

This is a list of schools in Jefferson Parish, Louisiana.

== Public schools ==
- See Jefferson Parish Public Schools

== Private schools ==
=== K-12 ===
- Crescent City Christian School (CCCS) - Metairie - Formed from the merger of Crescent City Baptist High School (originally Mid-City Baptist High School) and Celebration Christian School (K-8).
- Conquering Word Christian Academy (CWCA) - Marrero - It previously had two campuses, one in Marrero and one in Metairie. From 2013–2014 to 2014–2015, the enrollment at the Marrero campus declined by 52% and the Metairie campus closed, with the latter having fewer than 10 students. The school was affected by Hurricane Katrina and Hurricane Gustav. Principal Carolyn Treaudo pleaded guilty to misleading the Federal Emergency Management Agency (FEMA) into giving her money for an ineligible building after Gustav. It accepts school vouchers.
- John Curtis Christian School (River Ridge)
- Knights Academy & High School - Circa 2015 it faced a significant enrollment decrease of over 10% from 2013–2014 to 2014–2015.
- St. Martin's Episcopal School (Metairie)
- St. Thérèse Academy for Exceptional Learners - Metairie - Established 2019, replacing Holy Rosary School and Our Lady of Divine Providence School; it occupies the former campus of the latter school.
- Metairie Park Country Day School

=== High schools ===
- The Academy of Our Lady (Marrero)
- Archbishop Chapelle High School (Metairie)
- Archbishop Rummel High School (Metairie)
- Archbishop Shaw High School (Marrero)
- Lutheran High School of Greater New Orleans (Metairie) - This private school is approved by the state of Louisiana. From 2013–2014 to 2014-2015 enrollment increased by 47%; of the state-approved private schools in Jefferson it had the highest increase in percentage of students for that period. It accepts school vouchers.

=== K-8 schools ===
- Islamic School of Greater New Orleans (ISGNO) (Kenner) It faced a significant enrollment decrease of over 10% from 2013–2014 to 2014–2015.
- Torah Academy of New Orleans (Metairie) It was established sometime before 1995, and moved into a permanent facility in 1994. It reached a then-peak enrollment of 60 by 2005, but Hurricane Katrina destroyed its school building. It resumed operations with a reduced number of students and staff and less funding the following year. It temporarily operated out a Catholic school building and the Chabad Jewish Center. Della Hasselle of The Advocate wrote that Torah "struggled just to survive after Hurricane Katrina." In 2014 the current 16,000-square-foot (1,500 m^{2}), eight classroom, $5.7 million school facility, built on the site of the previous building, opened. Federal Emergency Management Agency (FEMA) funds were used to build the building. The facility has an auditorium, a gymnasium, two kitchens, and a play area. Circa 2015 it faced a significant enrollment decrease of over 10%. In 2016 it had 70 students, a new peak enrollment.

=== K-7 schools ===
- Academy of Our Lady (Marrero) - Its enrollment from 2013–2014 to 2014-2015 increased by 3%.
- Christ the King Parish School (Terrytown) - Its enrollment from 2013–2014 to 2014-2015 decreased by 15%.
- Immaculate Conception School (Marrero)
- Our Lady of Perpetual Help School (Kenner) - The school, the parish school of St. Mary's Roman Catholic Church, opened in 1928. In 1951 an annex to the school opened. Another building with classrooms and a gymnasium was dedicated in 1956, and the current school building was dedicated in 1961. The Mercy Center, which houses school offices and a library, gymnasium, and a dedicated room for music classes, was dedicated in August 2004. Its enrollment from 2013–2014 to 2014-2015 increased by 8%.
- Our Lady of Prompt Succor School (Westwego) - Its enrollment from 2013–2014 to 2014-2015 increased by 22%; it is the only school in the parish with an enrollment increase of over 10%.
- St. Angela Merici School (Metairie)
- St. Ann School (Metairie)
- St. Anthony School (Gretna)
- St. Benilde (Metairie)
- St. Catherine of Siena School (Metairie)
- St. Christopher School (Metairie)
- St. Clement of Rome School (Metairie)
- St. Cletus School (Gretna)
- St. Edward the Confessor School (Metairie)
- St. Elizabeth Ann Seton School (Kenner)
- St. Francis Xavier School (Metairie)
- St. Louis, King of France (Metairie) - On September 7, 1953, the school opened. Its peak enrollment was 1,500, though its initial enrollment was 40. The population decreased after new churches were established.
- St. Mary Magdalene School (Metairie)
- St. Matthew the Apostle School (River Ridge)
- St. Philip Neri School (Metairie)
- St. Rita School (Harahan)
- St. Rosalie School (Harvey)
- Visitation of Our Lady School (Marrero)

=== Elementary schools ===
- Jewish Community Day School (Metairie) - It is within the Goldring-Woldenberg Jewish Community Campus. As of 2020 it has about 80 students.

=== Former schools ===
- Archbishop Blenk High School - merged in 2007 into The Academy of Our Lady
- Immaculata High School - merged in 2007 into The Academy of Our Lady
- Our Lady of Divine Providence School (Metairie) - Grades PK-7 - Its enrollment from 2013-2014 to 2014-2015 decreased by 20%. Circa 2014 it had 211 students. In 2019 it had 167 students. It closed in 2019, replaced by St. Thérèse Academy for Exceptional Learners, which occupies the former Our Lady of Divine Providence.
- St. Agnes School (Jefferson) - It was created in 1941. The school accepted school vouchers. From the 2013–2014 school year to the 2014–2015 school year enrollment declined by 27%, the most severe of any Catholic school in the parish. In 2014 it had 161 students, and then in 2015, its year of closure, it had 125 students. Principal Michael Buras stated that the school community gained an acceptance that the school will close. As of 2020 Jefferson Chamber Foundation Academy (JCFA) maintains a charter school for non-traditional students in the building.
- Faith Christian Academy (Marrero) - It had 44 students when it closed circa 2014.
