= List of schools in the Roman Catholic Archdiocese of New Orleans =

This is a list of schools in the Roman Catholic Archdiocese of New Orleans. They are not all operated by the archdiocese. There are 5 universities or colleges and over 20 high schools within the archdiocese.

As per a 2013 strategic plan the New Orleans Archdiocese allows affiliated schools to either be grade PK-7 combined elementary and middle schools (similar to a K-8 school), grade 8-12 senior high schools, or full K-12 schools. As per the plan the standalone middle schools and combined middle and high schools were to reconfigure themselves. The new configurations were to be effective for the 2015-2016 school year. 37 schools were to be affected by the grade reconfiguration. The archdiocese planned to end affiliation with any school that did not comply with the grade configuration regime.

== Universities and colleges ==
New Orleans (Orleans Parish)

- Loyola University New Orleans
- Notre Dame Seminary
- Our Lady of Holy Cross College
- Xavier University of Louisiana

St. Tammany Parish

- Saint Joseph Seminary College (Covington)

== K-12 schools ==
All Female

- Academy of the Sacred Heart - Uptown
- Saint Mary's Academy - New Orleans East - Has separate PK -7 girls' school, grade 4-7 boys' school - and 8-12 girls' school
- St. Thérèse Academy for Exceptional Learners - Gentilly - Established 2019, replacing Holy Rosary School and Our Lady of Divine Providence School. It occupied the site of OLDP, then moved a few miles down the road to the former building of St. Mary Magdalene.Current location is Gentilly.
- Ursuline Academy - Uptown - all-female

All Male

- Holy Cross School - Gentilly; former location in Lower 9th Ward - relocated due to heavy damages from Hurricanes Katrina and Rita

== High schools (Grades 8th - 12th) ==
=== New Orleans (Orleans Parish) ===
All Male

- St. Augustine High School - Tremé
- Brother Martin High School - Gentilly
- Jesuit High School - Mid-City

All-Female

- Cabrini High School - Bayou St. John
- Mount Carmel Academy - Lakeview
- St. Katharine Drexel Preparatory School - Uptown
- St. Mary's Dominican High School - Uptown

Co-Ed

- De La Salle High School - originally all-male, became co-ed in 1992 after accepting female students from the nearby and recently closed Mercy Academy

=== Jefferson Parish ===
Marrero

- The Academy of Our Lady - all-female
- Archbishop Shaw High School - all-male

Metairie

- Archbishop Chapelle High School - all-female
- Archbishop Rummel High School - all-male

=== St. John the Baptist Parish ===
- St. Charles Catholic High School - LaPlace - co-ed

=== St. Tammany Parish ===
Covington

- Archbishop Hannan High School - co-ed; original location in Mereaux, LA, relocation due to Hurricane Katrina
- St. Paul's School - all-male
- St. Scholastica Academy - all-female

Slidell

- Pope John Paul II Catholic High School - co-ed

== K-7 schools ==
=== 8th Grade ===
Sometime in the 1980's, Catholic high schools in the Archdiocese slowly began adding 8th grade to their curriculum. Over the years, other high schools within the Archdiocese also began to add 8th grade as more students and parents became interested in the idea of their child effectively starting high school early. This practice became so popular that many grammar schools began to suffer a significant decrease in enrollment amongst their 8th-grade classes. In 2014, the office of Catholic schools decided to restructure their schools and ordered all Catholic high schools to add 8th grade. In addition, all grammar schools were required to drop their 8th-grade programs and add pre-kindergarten programs. All stand-alone Catholic middle schools, such as Christian Brothers and Stuart Hall, and schools that started in grades 5th, 6th, or 7th - like Holy Cross (5th-12th), St Augustine (7th-12th), and Brother Martin (7th-12th), were required to either add lower grades or begin in 8th grade like the other high schools. K-12 schools were able to keep their established grades. This change became effective by the start of the 2015-2016 school year.

Brother Martin and St. Augustine agreed to drop their 7th-grade programs, while Holy Cross decided to become a PK-12 school.

Many schools and parents were hesitant about this new plan, as some thought it was just a money grab, and also feared the possible fate of many schools.

=== New Orleans ===
- Christian Brothers School
  - Includes two campuses: Canal Street Campus (former St. Anthony of Padua School) in Mid-City, and the City Park (original) campus.
  - The school has a PK-4 coeducational elementary school at the Canal Street campus, an all girls' 5-7 middle school on Canal Street, and an all boys' 5-7 middle school in City Park.
  - It first opened in 1967. Previously Christian Brothers only had middle school and was all boys. In 2013 the archdiocese stated that it would no longer permit combined middle and high schools and standalone middle schools. In 2014 Christian Brothers and St. Anthony of Padua School announced they would merge effective fall 2016. In 2014 it had 360 students.
- Good Shepherd Nativity Mission
- Holy Name of Jesus School
- Resurrection of Our Lord School
- St. Alphonsus School
- St. Andrew the Apostle School
- St. Benedict the Moor School
- St. Dominic School
- St. Joan of Arc School

- St. Leo the Great
- St. Pius X School
- St. Rita School (closed as of Summer 2022)
- St. Stephen School - In Uptown New Orleans
- Stuart Hall School

=== Jefferson Parish ===
Gretna

- St. Anthony School - It was established in 1954.
- St. Cletus School

Harahan

- St. Rita School - It opened in 1953.

Harvey

- St. Rosalie School

Kenner

- Our Lady of Perpetual Help School - The school, the parish school of St. Mary’s Roman Catholic Church, opened in 1928. In 1951 an annex to the school opened. Another building with classrooms and a gymnasium was dedicated in 1956, and the current school building was dedicated in 1961. The Mercy Center, which houses school offices and a library, gymnasium, and a dedicated room for music classes, was dedicated in August 2004. Its enrollment from 2013-2014 to 2014-2015 increased by 8%.
- St. Elizabeth Ann Seton - It opened in August 1984.

Marrero

- Academy of Our Lady - Its enrollment from 2013-2014 to 2014-2015 increased by 3%.
- Immaculate Conception School
- Visitation of Our Lady School

Metairie

- St. Angela Merici School
- St. Ann School
- St. Benilde
- St. Catherine of Siena School
- St. Christopher School
- St. Clement of Rome School
- St. Edward the Confessor School
- St. Francis Xavier School
- St. Louis, King of France - On September 7, 1953, the school opened. Its initial enrollment was 40 students. Its peak enrollment was 1,500, though its initial enrollment was 40. The population decreased after new churches were established.
- St. Philip Neri Catholic School

River Ridge

- St. Matthew the Apostle School - The school opened in September 1960, with an educational building with 16 classrooms. In August 1962 another structure for classes opened, serving alongside the 1960 facility. In 1999 the current dining hall was built.

Terrytown

- Christ the King Parish School - Its enrollment from 2013-2014 to 2014-2015 decreased by 15%.

Westwego

- Our Lady of Prompt Succor School - Its enrollment from 2013-2014 to 2014-2015 increased by 22%; it is the only school in the parish with an enrollment increase of over 10%.

=== Plaquemines Parish ===
Belle Chasse

- Our Lady of Perpetual Help School - In 2018 it was establishing a program for students with moderate disabilities.

=== St. Bernard Parish ===
Chalmette

- Our Lady Of Prompt Succor School

=== St. Charles Parish ===
Destrehan

- St. Charles Borromeo School

=== St. John the Baptist Parish ===
Laplace

- Ascension of Our Lord School
- St. Joan of Arc School

Reserve

- St. Peter School

=== St. Tammany Parish ===
Covington

- St. Peter Catholic School

Mandeville

- Mary Queen of Peace School
- Our Lady of the Lake School

Slidell

- Our Lady of Lourdes School
- St. Margaret Mary School

=== Washington Parish ===
Bogalusa

- Annunciation School

== Others ==
New Orleans (Orleans Parish)

- St. Michael's Special School - school for special populations

Head Start Programs

- St. Mary of the Angels (Algiers)
- St. John the Baptist (Lower Garden District)
- St. Paul the Apostle (NO East)
- Incarnate Word (Uptown)

Jefferson Parish

- Hope Haven Special School (Marrero)

== Former Schools ==
In 1962 there were 153 Catholic schools. In 2000 the system had 52,500 students, in 106 schools. The number of schools was the same in 2003.

Hurricane Katrina in 2005 affected enrollment, with the system losing about 500 students annually, until the 2013, when there were 38,000 students, a 28% decline from the figure in 2000. The enrollment decline from 2003 to 2013 was 25%. The number of schools had declined to 84 in 2013.In the period 2003-2013 22 schools had closed.

In 2012 the archdiocese announced that it would consider closing grade schools with enrollments under 200 and identified 15 schools that it may close, although it did not, at the time, state which ones they were. In 2014 the archdiocese chose to close three schools effective 2015. 50 employees and 507 students were affected. As of 2014 the archdiocese initiates a discussion on whether to close a Catholic grade school if the number of its students falls below 200.

Jefferson Parish

Former High Schools

- Archbishop Blenk High School - merged in 2007 into The Academy of Our Lady
- Immaculata High School - merged in 2007 into The Academy of Our Lady

Former Grammar Schools

- Our Lady of Divine Providence School (Metairie) - Grades PK-7 - Its enrollment from 2013-2014 to 2014-2015 decreased by 20%. Circa 2014 it had 211 students. In 2019 it had 167 students. It closed in 2019, replaced by St. Thérèse Academy for Exceptional Learners, which occupies the former Our Lady of Divine Providence.
- St. Agnes School (Jefferson) - It was created in 1941, and closed in 2015. From the 2013-2014 school year to the 2014-2015 school year enrollment declined by 27%, the most severe of any Catholic school in the parish. In 2014 it had 161 students, and then in 2015 it had 125 students. Principal Michael Buras stated that the school community gained an acceptance that the school will close. The school accepted school vouchers. As of 2020 Jefferson Chamber Foundation Academy (JCFA) maintains a charter school for non-traditional students in the building.
- St. Jerome School (Kenner, LA) - closed in 1971
- St. Lawrence the Martyr (Metairie, LA) - closed at the end of the 1999 school year
- St. Mary Magdalene (Metairie, LA) - closed in 2022

New Orleans (Orleans Parish)

Former High Schools

- Academy of the Holy Angels - all-female, grades 9th-12th; closed in 1992 due to declining enrollment
- Annunciation High School - The parish high school of Annunciation Church, it opened in 1932 and closed in 1971.
- Holy Rosary School - co-ed (K-12) - Closed in 2019
- St. John Vianney Prep - closed in 1985
- St. Joseph's Academy - all-girls, grades 9th thru 12th; merged with Sacred Heart in 1975 to form Seton Academy; the school's former location was used for Redeemer-Seton and then eventually Holy Cross High School
- Mercy Academy - grades 9-12, closed in 1992
- Redeemer-Seton High School - co-ed (9-12) - closed in 2006 due to Hurricane Katrina; was the 2nd most damaged high school in the city, after Alfred Lawless High School; the former buildings were demolished and Holy Cross, who's original campus was also destroyed from Hurricanes Katrina and Rita, relocated to rebuild on the now empty lot.
- Redemptorist High School) - all male, grades 9-12; merged with Seton Academy for form Redeemer-Seton in 1994
- Sacred Heart - (all-female, grades 9-12) - closed in 1975; opened the next year as Seton Academy
- Seton Academy (all-female, grades 9-12) - opened in 1976 at the former site of Sacred Heart; closed in 1994 to merge with Redemptorist High School
- St. James Major High School (the all-girls school) officially closed its doors in 1994.
- Xavier University Preparatory School - all-female (8th-12th) - closed in 2013, but was able to re-open as St. Katherine Drexel Prep due to strong alumni funding

Former Middle Schools

- Marian Central School (Gentilly) - all boys, grades 6-8, closed due to Hurricane Katrina
- Bishop Perry School (NO East) - all boys, grades 6-8, opened in 1993, closed in 2006 due to Hurricane Katrina

Former Grammar Schools

- Immaculate Heart of Mary School
- Annunciation Elementary School - Opened in 1894.
- Cathedral Academy, originally St. Louis Cathedral School - In the French Quarter It opened in 1914, and had a building separate from that of its parish. In 2012 the archdiocese decided to close the school. It had 156 students in 2012, and the archdiocese's criterion for optimal enrollment in a K-7 was 200. St. Stephen offered places to St. Louis Cathedral students. Cathedral Academy parents stated opposition against the closure.
- Holy Ghost School (Uptown) - It was a part of the Katharine Drexel Parish, and accepted school vouchers. It closed in 2015; it had 166 students that year.
- Our Lady of Lourdes School
- Our Lady of the Rosary School - The building has a capacity of 500. It housed the Morris Jeff Community School, and after that one moved out in 2015, Bricolage Academy of New Orleans. Bricolage moved down Esplanade Avenue to the former John McDonogh High School campus in the fall of 2018. New Harmony High School is now housed in the former Our Lady of the Rosary school buildings.
- St. Francis of Assisi School - The building was later leased by the charter school Milestone SABIS Academy. In November 2011 St. Francis of Assisi Church agreed to lease its school building to another charter school, Lycée Français de la Nouvelle-Orléans. The Milestone SABIS school leadership learned of the change through the media.
- St. Anthony of Padua School - merging with Christian Brothers in the 2016-2017 school year
- St. Cecilia School - now a DePaul Community Health Center
- St. Peter Claver School - It was in Tremé. It was established in 1921, and closed in 2019. In its final year it had 147 students, while the archdiocese's expected enrollment was 200. At the time its budget shortfall was $83,000. Its tuition usually ranged from $5,400 to $5,900 during the 2017-2018 school year.
- St. Matthias School - Opened in 1921 closed in 1979. The school building was affected by Hurricane Katrina.
- St. Monica School - Master P attended this school. In 1999 it had 125 students. That year the archdiocese leadership stated that it was considering closing the school and merging it into Our Lady of Lourdes. Master P sent $250,000 to the school so it could remain in operation. Hurricane Katrina damaged the school and its affiliated church in 2005; by 2011 the archdiocese sold the property for the buildings to be razed.
- St. Paul the Apostle School
- St. Philip the Apostle School
- St. Raphael - merged with St. James Major to form St. Joseph Central School
- St. Raymond School
- St. Rose of Lima School - In 1962 the school desegregated, which resulted in anti-integration protests. In 1978 the congregation ended the school.
- St. Simon Peter School
- St. James Major Elementary School - merged with St. Raphael at the beginning of the 1999-2000 school year; officially closed as a standalone parish school in 2005 due to the catastrophic flooding and damage caused by Hurricane Katrina.

Plaquemines Parish

- Our Lady of Good Harbor School (Buras) - grades PK-8; It was the first school that the archdiocese ordered desegregated circa the 1960s. As a result, area white families boycotted the school. In August 1963 a vandal bombed the school. Hurricane Camille in 1969 damaged the school.

St. Bernard Parish

- St. Louise de Marillac School (Arabi)
- St. Robert Bellarmine School (Arabi)

St. John the Baptist Parish

- Our Lady of Grace School (Reserve) - Closed in 2015; it had 171 students remaining, with about 51 having taken advantage of a Louisiana school voucher regime. There were two graduating classes in 2015.

St. Landry Parish

- St. Charles College (Grand Coteau) - closed in 1922
