= Michelle Kosinski =

American journalist

- Born: Willingboro, New Jersey, United States
- Occupation: Journalist
- Known for: NBC News/CNN correspondent
- Spouse: Kimbell Duncan (2014–present)
- Children: 2

Michelle Kosinski is an American journalist, host, and public speaker. She wrote and hosted the podcast The Perfect Scam. Previously she was a Senior Diplomatic Correspondent for CNN and White House Correspondent for CNN until 2019.

Kosinski was a foreign correspondent for NBC News based in London (2010–2014); before that, she was a correspondent based in Miami (2005–2009).

She has covered numerous international news stories, including the US war in Afghanistan, the Arab Spring, the assassination of Benazir Bhutto, the Haiti earthquake, the BP oil spill, the Virginia Tech shootings, the Obama White House, and the tenure and firing of Rex Tillerson.

== Early life and education ==
Kosinski was born in Willingboro Township, New Jersey, and grew up in nearby Cinnaminson Township, New Jersey. She is one of four children of Jeanette, a chemist, and Robert, a retired biologist who worked for the New Jersey Department of Environmental Protection. While working as a television news photographer and reporter in Charlotte, North Carolina, she also performed with the award-winning Piedmont Players theater group, in roles such as Elvira in Blithe Spirit and Suzanne in Don't Dress for Dinner.

Kosinski attended St. Charles Borromeo School and graduated from Holy Cross High School as valedictorian. She earned bachelor's and master's degrees from the Medill School of Journalism at Northwestern University.

== Career ==
Kosinski began her broadcast journalism career in Rockford, Illinois, working for WIFR while she attended Northwestern University. She left WIFR and moved to Charlotte, North Carolina, to work at WSOC-TV, where she founded the Piedmont Bureau.

In the fall of 2001, she left WSOC-TV for WTVJ in Miami. She is a 2003 Suncoast Regional Emmy Awards Craft Winner for reporting on Haitian immigrants and was named Woman of the Year in 2005 by Women in Communications of South Florida.

Kosinski has covered such world events as the War in Afghanistan, terrorist plots in Europe, international court cases, and the 2010 Haiti earthquake.

=== NBC News ===
In 2005, Kosinski worked as a foreign correspondent for NBC News based in London. She covered numerous international events such as the 2010 Haiti earthquake, the aftermath of the Arab Spring, the assassination of Benazir Bhutto, terrorist plots and bombings in Europe, US-Russia relations, as well as the Virginia Tech shooting.

In August 2005, while covering the Natalee Holloway disappearance in Aruba, NBC arranged an interview with the director of Aruban prisons and a tour of suspect Joran van der Sloot's prison. During the tour, Kosinski ran into van der Sloot and conducted an off-camera interview. Prison director Fred Maduro appeared live on MSNBC and admitted that he offered her the tour. After Van der Sloot's attorneys called for a hearing on the matter, NBC declined to air the footage.

In 2005, while covering New Jersey flooding for NBC, Kosinksi paddled a canoe through what she called deep floodwaters, until two pedestrians walked through the shot, revealing the water to only be a few inches deep. Kosinski admitted on air, "O.K., this probably looks a little bad". News reports from the time showed waist-deep water and people using boats. Kosinski later told The New York Observer that the shot was originally in the deeper water, but the crew moved the boat to the edge of the water, to properly light and mic her, and out of safety concerns over the fast moving current. The move was visible in the taped piece that aired with the live report.

In 2009, she won a national Emmy Award for live reporting during NBC News' special coverage of the 2008 U.S. presidential election.

In 2010, Kosinski was named a foreign correspondent and moved from NBC's Southeast Bureau to London.

In 2014, she became a White House correspondent for CNN.

== Personal life ==
In August 2013, Kosinski announced her engagement to retired investment banker and philanthropist Kimbell Duncan. They married on August 9, 2014. The Times of London reported allegations about a 2018 "passionate affair [lasting] at least several months" with the UK's ambassador to the US, which "resulted in impressive scoops for Kosinski." Kosinski denied that the scoops originated with the ambassador.
