= HRHS =

HRHS may refer to:

- Hypoplastic right heart syndrome, a rare congenital heart defect

== Schools ==
- Hampshire Regional High School, Westhampton, Massachusetts, United States
- Hickory Ridge High School, Harrisburg, North Carolina, United States
- Highlands Ranch High School, Highlands Ranch, Colorado, United States
- Holy Redeemer High School, Wilkes-Barre, Pennsylvania, United States
- Holy Rosary High School (New Orleans), Louisiana, United States
- Hood River Valley High School, Hood River, Oregon, United States
- Heritage Regional High School, Saint-Hubert, Quebec, Canada
