= St. Christopher's School =

St. Christopher's School is the name of several schools around the world, including:

- St. Christopher's School, Bristol, UK
- St. Christopher's School, Bahrain
- St. Christopher's School (Harare), Zimbabwe
- St. Christopher's School, Richmond, Virginia, USA
- St. Christopher's School, Metairie, Louisiana, USA

== See also ==
- St Christopher School, Letchworth Garden City, England
