= St. Charles Borromeo School =

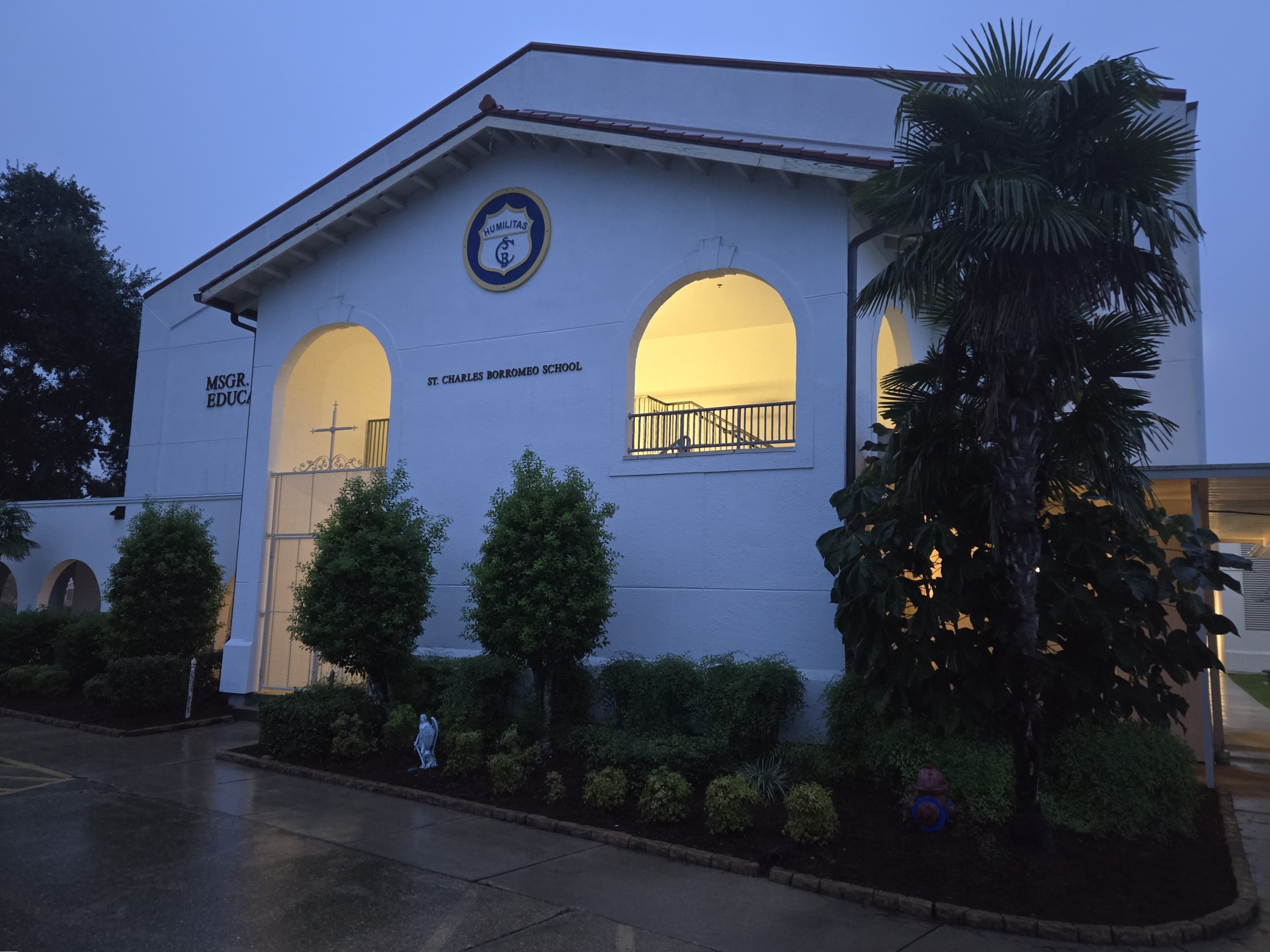
- St. Charles Borromeo School building

Location
- 13396 River Road; Destrehan, Louisiana 70047; United States; 29°57′1″N 90°22′29″W

Information
- Motto: Humilitas
- Denomination: Roman Catholic
- Patron saint: St. Charles Borromeo
- Opened: 1929
- Oversight: Archdiocese of New Orleans
- Principal: Rachel Hafford
- Teaching staff: 30.1 (on an FTE basis)
- Grades: PK–7
- Gender: Co-Ed
- Enrollment: 443 (2019–20)
- Average class size: 20
- Student to teacher ratio: 11.6
- Colors: Blue and Gold
- Slogan: Humilitas
- Athletics: Soccer (Co-Ed), Flag Football (Girls and Boys), Baseball, Softball, Volleyball (Girls), Basketball (Girls and Boys), Cheerleading, Dancing
- Sports: Soccer (Co-Ed), Flag Football (Girls and Boys), Baseball, Softball, Volleyball (Girls), Basketball (Girls and Boys), Cheerleading, Cross Country
- Mascot: Hurricanes
- Nickname: SCB
- Team name: Hurricanes
- Website: school.scbhumilitas.org
- Southern Association of Colleges and Schools

St. Charles Borromeo School is a private Catholic school in Destrehan, Louisiana, located on the 17-acre grounds of St. Charles Borromeo Catholic Church. It serves students from Pre-kindergarten to seventh grade.

== History ==
In 1929, an elementary school and was built on the grounds of St. Charles Borromeo Catholic Church. It was the first parochial school opened between New Orleans and Baton Rouge, and it was operated by the Sisters of the Congregation of the Immaculate Conception. In 1948, a parochial high school, St. Charles Borromeo High School, opened on the site.

In 1960, the Sisters of the Most Holy Sacrament took over operation of the schools, and in 1978 the high school closed and moved to LaPlace, Louisiana becoming St. Charles Catholic High School.

St. Charles Borromeo School is still located on the site of St. Charles Borromeo Catholic Church.

== Extracurricular activities ==
Student groups and activities include Academic Games, Student Council, Jr. Beta Club, choir, PK - 7th grade cheerleading, competition cheerleading, Spanish, art, Brown Foundation Service Learning, Missoula, drumline, and both boys and girls varsity and junior varsity sports.

== See also ==
- List of schools in the Roman Catholic Archdiocese of New Orleans
- St. Charles Parish, Louisiana
- Saint Charles Borromeo
