= Joe Zimmerman Stadium =

Stadium in New Orleans

Coordinates: 29°53′32″N 90°6′13″W

- Zimmerman Stadium
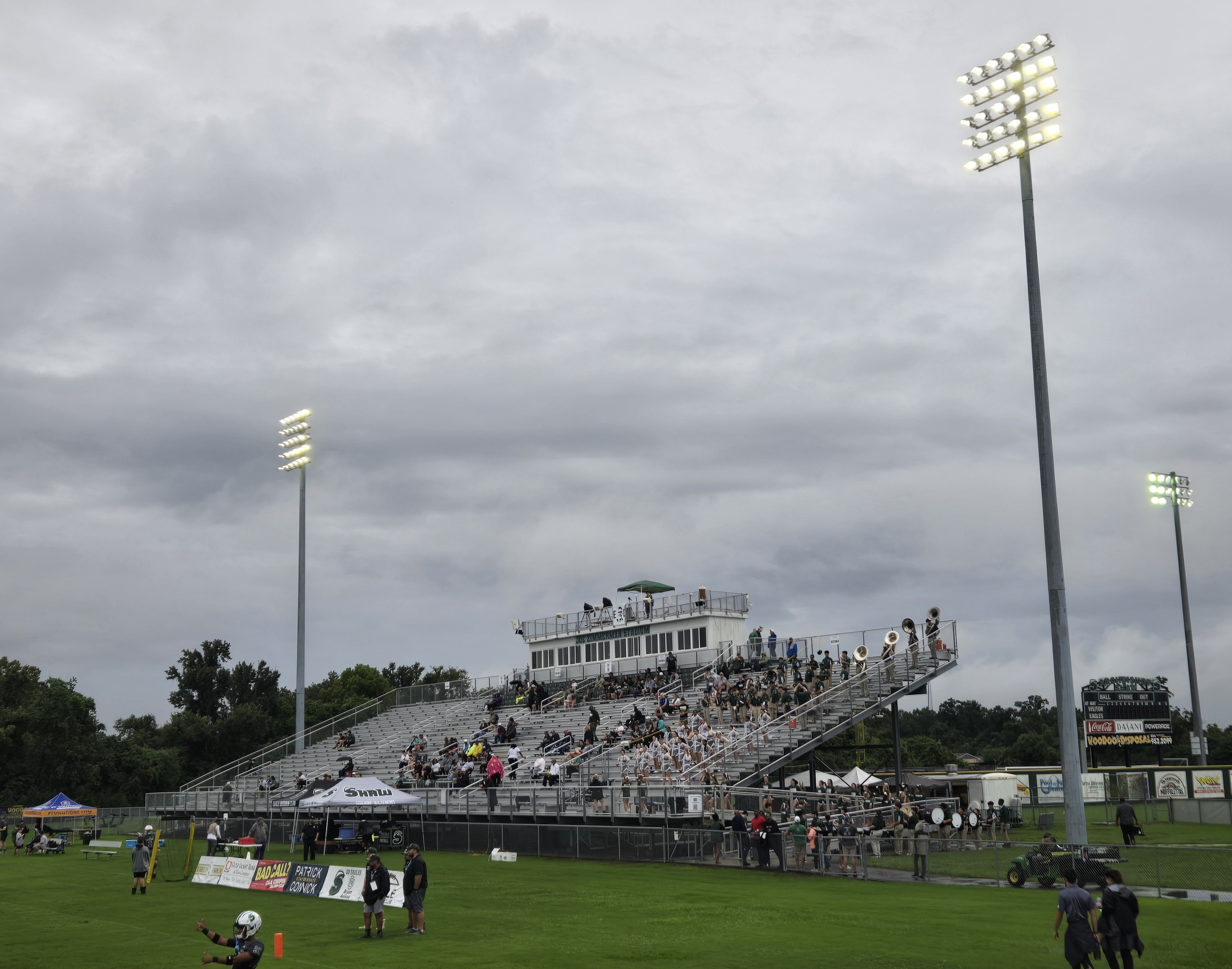
- Interactive map of Joe Zimmerman Stadium
- Former names: Archbishop Shaw High School Stadium
- Owner: Eagle Athletic Facilities L3C
- Operator: Eagle Athletic Facilities L3C
- Capacity: 3,000
- Surface: Grass

Construction
- Groundbreaking: 2017
- Opened: 2018
- Architect: Dalton Architects Inc.

Tenants
- LHSAA (football)(lacrosse)(soccer) (2018–Present); New Orleans Gold (MLR) (2018–2019)

Joe Zimmerman Stadium is a 3,000-seat natural turf football/multipurpose stadium located on the campus of Archbishop Shaw High School. It is the home stadium for Archbishop Shaw athletics in addition to hosting sporting events for multiple area schools.

== History ==
Groundbreaking for the stadium, originally named Archbishop Shaw High School Stadium, took place on November 1, 2017. The stadium opened in 2018 and was later renamed Joe Zimmerman Stadium on September 13, 2019 after former Archbishop Shaw head football coach, Joe Zimmerman. He served as head coach at the school from 1969 to 1982.

From 2018 to 2019, it was the home stadium for the New Orleans Gold of Major League Rugby under the branding of Gold Stadium.

In 2021, permanent lighting was added to the stadium.

== Sports ==
Football, flag football, lacrosse, rugby and soccer are played at the stadium.

== Gallery ==
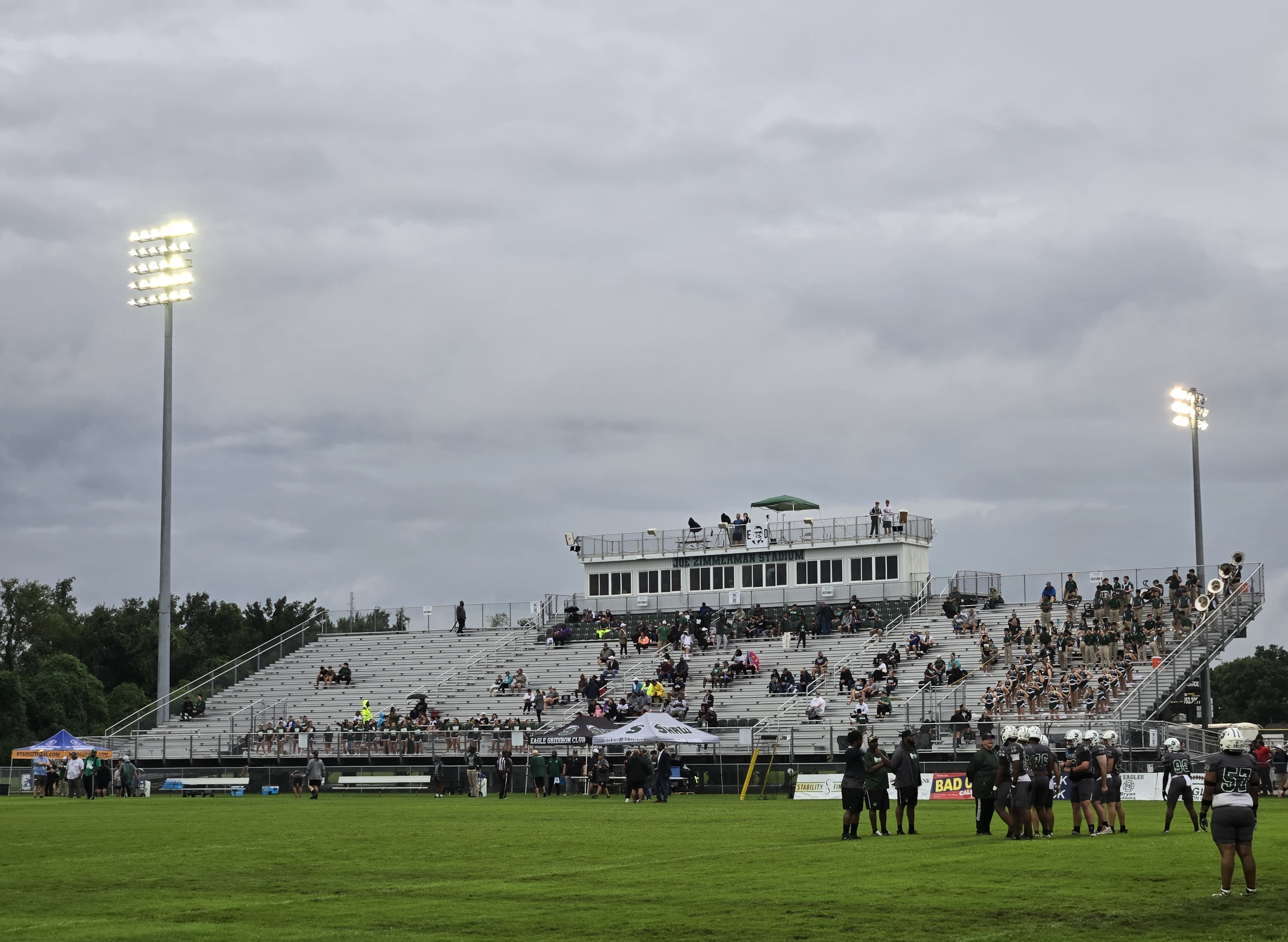

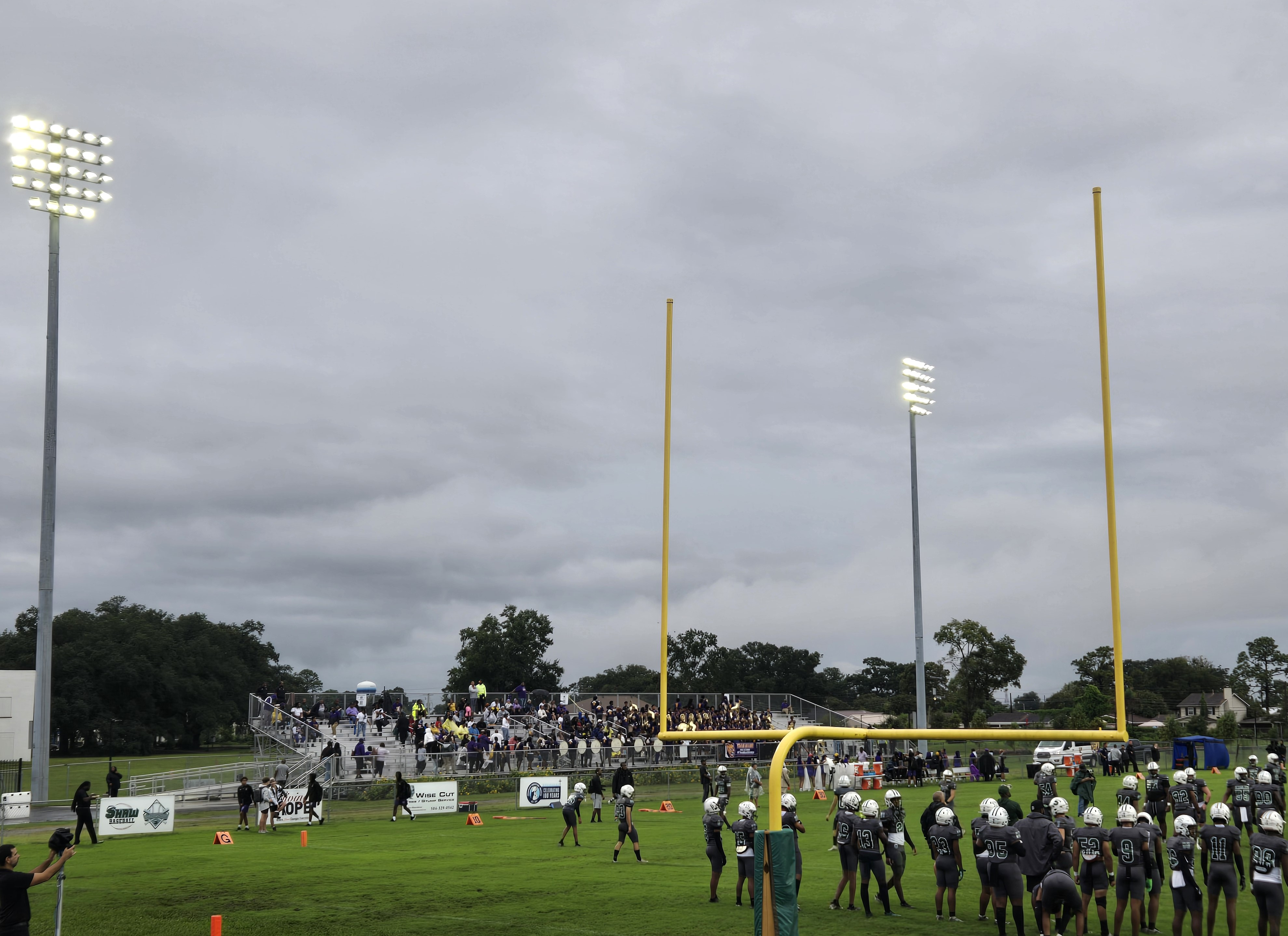

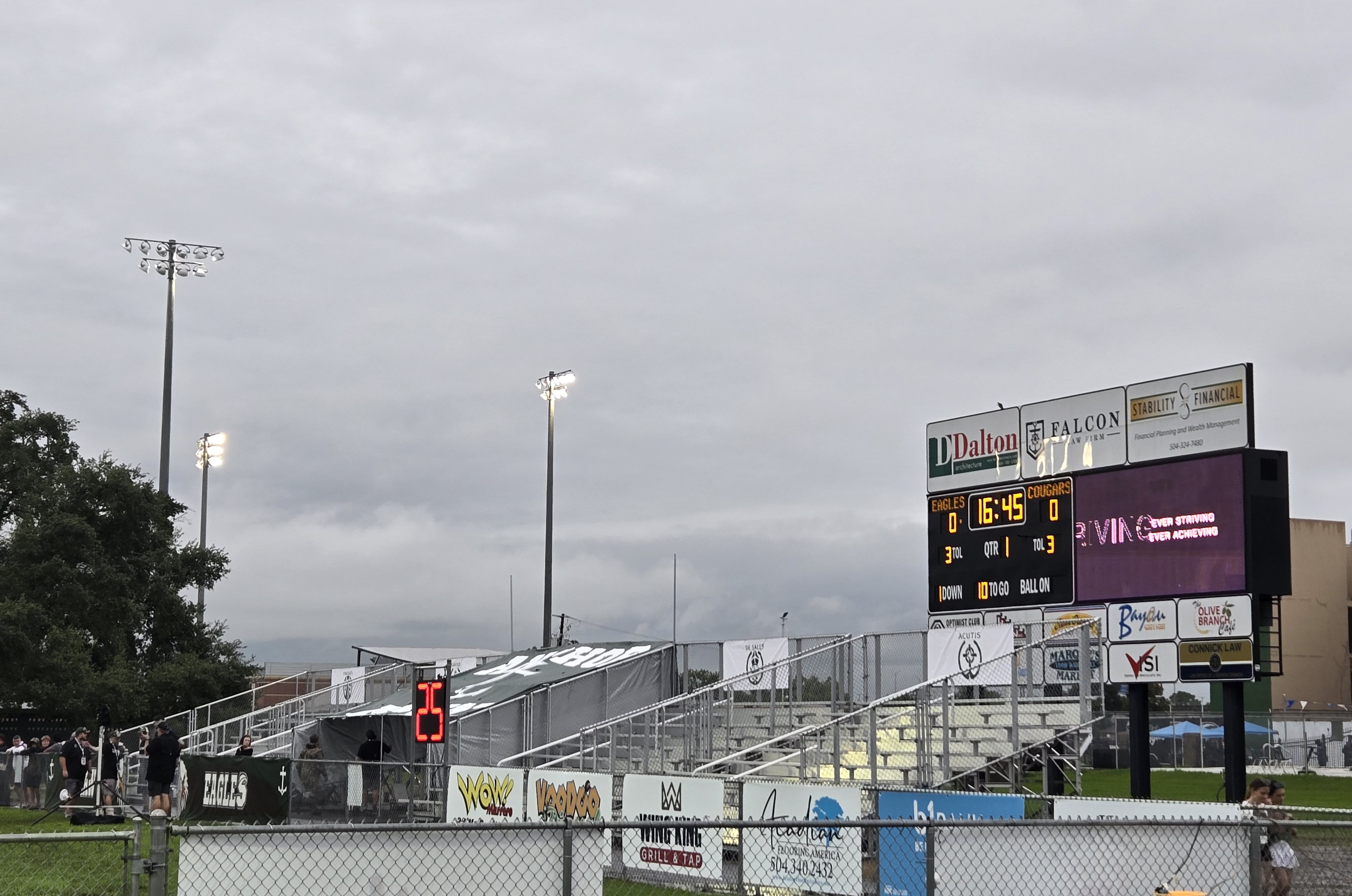
