= Samuel Joseph (American football) =

American football player and coach (born 1983)

Nicholls Colonels
- Title: Running backs coach
- CFL status: American

Personal information
- Born: May 10, 1983 (age 43); Marrero, Louisiana, U.S.
- Listed height: 5 ft 11 in (1.80 m)
- Listed weight: 184 lb (83 kg)

Career information
- High school: Marrero (LA) Archbishop Shaw
- College: LSU
- NFL draft: 2007: undrafted

Career history

Playing
- San Francisco 49ers (2007); Toronto Argonauts (2009–2010)

Coaching
- LSU (2014–2015) Strength and conditioning intern; St. Michael Catholic Academy (2017) Strength and conditioning coach; Nicholls (2018–present) Running backs coach
- Stats at CFL.ca (archive)

Samuel Louis Joseph (born May 10, 1983) is the running backs coach for the Nicholls Colonels football team.

== Playing career ==
Joseph played college football at Colorado in 2003 and at LSU from 2005 to 2006 after transferring and sitting out the 2004 season. He was signed by the San Francisco 49ers as an undrafted free agent in 2007. From 2009 to 2010, Joseph played defensive back in the Canadian Football League for the Toronto Argonauts.

== Coaching career ==
Joseph began his coaching career as a strength and conditioning intern at LSU from 2014 to 2015. He spent the 2017 season at St. Michael's Catholic Academy as the head strength and conditioning coach. In 2018, Joseph became the running backs coach for the Nicholls Colonels football team.

== Personal life ==
Joseph's older brother, Vance, was a quarterback and running back for the Colorado Buffaloes from 1990 to 1995. Vance served as head coach of the Denver Broncos from 2017–2018 and currently serves as their defensive coordinator. Joseph's other older brother, Mickey, played quarterback for the Nebraska Cornhuskers and is the current head coach at Grambling State.
