= Lavar Edwards =

American football player (born 1990)

No. 98, 95, 76, 93, 92
- Position: Defensive end

Personal information
- Born: April 29, 1990 (age 36); Gretna, Louisiana, U.S.
- Listed height: 6 ft 4 in (1.93 m)
- Listed weight: 277 lb (126 kg)

Career information
- High school: Desire Street Academy (Baton Rouge, Louisiana)
- College: LSU
- NFL draft: 2013: 5th round, 142nd overall pick

Career history
- Tennessee Titans (2013); Dallas Cowboys (2014); Oakland Raiders (2015)*; Chicago Bears (2015); Dallas Cowboys (2015)*; Buffalo Bills (2015); Carolina Panthers (2016); Indianapolis Colts (2016); Cleveland Browns (2017); Saskatchewan Roughriders (2018–2019)
- * Offseason or practice squad member only

Career NFL statistics
- Total tackles: 23
- Sacks: 2.0
- Stats at Pro Football Reference

Lavar M. Edwards (born April 29, 1990) is an American former professional football player who was a defensive end in the National Football League (NFL) and Canadian Football League (CFL). He played college football for the LSU Tigers. He was selected by the Tennessee Titans in the fifth round of the 2013 NFL draft.

== Early life ==
Edwards attended Desire Street Academy high school. He was ranked among the top 40 prospects in the state of Louisiana by Rivals.com. During high school, He was named to the Baton Rouge Advocate's Super Dozen.

College recruiting
Name	Hometown	School	Height	Weight	40^{‡}	Commit date
Lavar Edwards; Defensive end	Baton Rouge, Louisiana	Desire Street Academy	6 ft 4 in (1.93 m)	300 lb (140 kg)	4.9 (According to Scouts.com)	Jan 26, 2008
Lavar Edwards; Defensive end	Recruit ratings: Scout: Rivals:					
Overall recruit ranking: Scout: 23 (TE) Rivals: 42 (DE), 33 (Louisiana)
‡ Refers to 40-yard dash; Note: In many cases, Scout, Rivals, 247Sports, On3, and ESPN may conflict in their listings of height, weight and 40 time.; In these cases, the average was taken. ESPN grades are on a 100-point scale.; Sources: "2008 LSU Football Commitments". Rivals.; "2008 LSU Football Recruiting Commits". Scout.; "Scout.com Team Recruiting Rankings". Scout.; "2008 Team Ranking". Rivals.com.

== College career ==
He accepted a scholarship to play at Louisiana State University for coach Les Miles's LSU Tigers football teams from 2009 to 2012. In his last two years, he played defensive end behind Barkevious Mingo and Sam Montgomery.

He finished his college career with a total of 96 tackles, 10.5 sacks, two interceptions and two forced fumbles. On January 25, 2013, he was selected to participate in the 2013 Senior Bowl.

== Professional career ==
Pre-draft measurables
Height	Weight	Arm length	Hand span	40-yard dash	Vertical jump	Broad jump
6 ft 4 in (1.93 m)	277 lb (126 kg)	35 1/2 in (0.90 m)	10 in (0.25 m)	4.80 s	33.0 in (0.84 m)	119 ft 0 in (36.27 m)
All values from the NFL Combine

=== Tennessee Titans ===
Edwards was selected by the Tennessee Titans in the fifth round (142nd overall) of the 2013 NFL draft, with the intention of playing defensive end in defensive coordinator Jerry Gray's 4-3 defense. As a rookie, he was inactive for nine games, played in 7 contests (one start), while registering 10 tackles, one tackle for loss, one quarterback pressure and a pass defensed.

The next year defensive coordinator Ray Horton was hired to change the defense to a 3–4 alignment, so he was traded to the Dallas Cowboys in exchange for a conditional seventh round pick (not exercised) on August 30, 2014.

=== Dallas Cowboys (first stint) ===
Edwards was waived on September 20, 2014, with this pattern repeating two additional times during the season, until being re-signed to the practice squad on November 3. He was placed on the injured reserve list on December 10, finishing with 10 tackles. He was cut on September 6, 2015, to make room for running back Christine Michael.

=== Oakland Raiders ===
A day after being waived by the Dallas Cowboys, Edwards was claimed by the Oakland Raiders. On September 11, 2015, he was cut to make room for linebacker Aldon Smith.

=== Chicago Bears ===
On September 16, 2015, he was signed by the Chicago Bears. He was released on September 25.

=== Dallas Cowboys (second stint) ===
On September 29, 2015, Edwards was signed to the Cowboys' practice squad.

=== Buffalo Bills ===
On December 1, 2015, he was signed by the Buffalo Bills from the Cowboys practice squad. On September 2, 2016, he was released by the Bills as part of final roster cuts.

=== Carolina Panthers ===
On September 4, 2016, Edwards was claimed off waivers by the Panthers. He was released on October 18, 2016.

=== Indianapolis Colts ===
Edwards was claimed off waivers by the Indianapolis Colts on October 19, 2016. He was released by the Colts on December 15, 2016, and was signed to the practice squad. He signed a reserve/future contract with the Colts on January 2, 2017. On September 2, 2017, Edwards was waived by the Colts.

=== Cleveland Browns ===
On December 13, 2017, Edwards was signed by the Cleveland Browns.
