= Vance Joseph =

American football player and coach (born 1972)

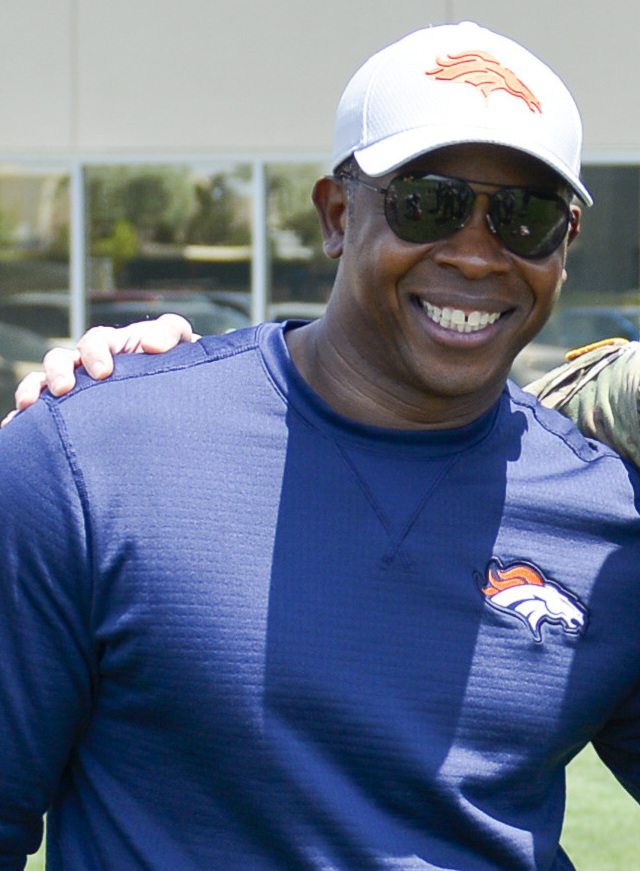
- Joseph with the Denver Broncos in 2018

Denver Broncos
- Title: Defensive coordinator

Personal information
- Born: September 20, 1972 (age 54); Marrero, Louisiana, U.S.
- Listed height: 6 ft 0 in (1.83 m)
- Listed weight: 202 lb (92 kg)

Career information
- Position: Cornerback (No. 43)
- High school: Archbishop Shaw (Marrero)
- College: Colorado (1990–1994)
- NFL draft: 1995: undrafted

Career history

Playing
- New York Jets (1995); Indianapolis Colts (1996); Denver Broncos (1997)*; Rhein Fire (1999); Orlando Predators (1999)
- * Offseason or practice squad member only

Coaching
- Colorado (1999–2003); Graduate assistant (1999–2001); Defensive backs coach (2002–2003); Bowling Green (2004) Defensive backs coach; San Francisco 49ers (2005–2010); Assistant defensive backs coach (2005); Defensive backs coach (2006–2010); Houston Texans (2011–2013) Defensive backs coach; Cincinnati Bengals (2014–2015) Defensive backs coach; Miami Dolphins (2016) Defensive coordinator; Denver Broncos (2017–2018) Head coach; Arizona Cardinals (2019–2022) Defensive coordinator; Denver Broncos (2023–present) Defensive coordinator

Awards and highlights
- National champion (1990)

Career NFL statistics
- Tackles: 21
- Interceptions: 2
- Stats at Pro Football Reference

Head coaching record
- Regular season: 11–21 (.344)
- Coaching profile at Pro Football Reference

Vance Desmond Joseph (born September 20, 1972) is an American professional football coach and former player who is the defensive coordinator for the Denver Broncos of the National Football League (NFL). He played college football for the Colorado Buffaloes as a quarterback and running back in the 1990s, and was signed by the New York Jets as an undrafted free agent in 1995, playing cornerback for them and then the Indianapolis Colts in 1996. After spending 12 years as a defensive coach in the NFL with the San Francisco 49ers, Houston Texans, Cincinnati Bengals, and Miami Dolphins, Joseph was hired by the Broncos to be their head coach in 2017 before getting fired the following year. After his first tenure with the Broncos, Joseph served as defensive coordinator for the Arizona Cardinals from 2019 to 2022, before being re-hired by Denver as their defensive coordinator in 2023.

== Playing career ==
=== High school ===
Joseph was the starting quarterback for three seasons for the Archbishop Shaw High School Eagles. He led his team to a 37–6 record in his three seasons and won Louisiana’s 4A state championship as a sophomore. Joseph garnered USA Today honorable-mention All-America honors as a senior and finished as 4A state runner-up to Ruston High School. He was also a starting guard on Archbishop Shaw's 1988–89 Class 4A state champion basketball team and lettered all four seasons in basketball.

=== College career ===
Joseph attended the University of Colorado and played for the Colorado Buffaloes football team as a quarterback and running back from 1990 to 1994. He played in 30 games for the Buffs as a backup to All-Americans Darian Hagan and fellow Marrero native Kordell Stewart. Joseph completed 34-of-61 passes (55.7%) for 454 yards with four touchdowns to go along with 50 carries for 237 yards and a touchdown during his college career. He was also a member of the 1990 National Championship team.

Joseph graduated from the Leeds School of Business with a degree in marketing in 1994.

=== National Football League ===
Joseph was signed by the New York Jets as an undrafted free agent in 1995 and switched to cornerback and played two seasons in the NFL for the Jets and Indianapolis Colts. Joseph finished his career with 21 tackles and two interceptions.

== Coaching career ==
=== College ===
Joseph became a graduate assistant for the Colorado Buffaloes in 1999 and was there until 2001. After a brief stint as the secondary coach for Wyoming Cowboys in 2002, he returned to Colorado to become the defensive backs coach. Joseph spent the 2004 season as the defensive backs coach for the Bowling Green Falcons.

=== San Francisco 49ers ===
On February 17, 2005, Joseph was hired by the San Francisco 49ers as a secondary assistant. In 2006, he was promoted to secondary coach, a position he shared with Johnnie Lynn until 2010, when Lynn resigned for personal reasons.

=== Houston Texans ===
Joseph joined the coaching staff of the Houston Texans in 2011. He served as the defensive backs coach under defensive coordinator Wade Phillips and head coach Gary Kubiak. Joseph helped the Texans to three consecutive top-seven NFL rankings in overall defense. Joseph’s secondary contributed to the team allowing the third-fewest passing yards per game (203.5) during that three-year stretch, helping Houston to its first two division titles in team history and playoff wins from 2011–12.

=== Cincinnati Bengals ===
Joseph was hired as the defensive backs coach of the Cincinnati Bengals in January 2014. He helped the Bengals to back-to-back playoff appearances as their defensive backs coach from 2014 to 2015 under head coach Marvin Lewis, guiding a unit that contributed to a league-best 41 interceptions during that span.

=== Miami Dolphins ===
Joseph was announced as the defensive coordinator of the Miami Dolphins for the 2016 season under head coach Adam Gase. Joseph oversaw a defense that played a key role in the Dolphins returning to the playoffs for the first time in eight seasons. Despite having to use 13 different starting lineups due to injury, the defense ranked fourth in the NFL on third downs (36.2%) while forcing the sixth-most negative plays (107) in the league. The Dolphins won nine of their final 11 regular-season games in 2016 with Joseph’s defense accounting for the fourth-most takeaways (21) in the NFL during that stretch.

=== Denver Broncos (first stint) ===
Joseph was hired as head coach for the Denver Broncos on January 11, 2017, after signing a four-year contract. He is the second African American head coach in Broncos history, after Eric Studesville was interim head coach for four games in 2010, and their first African-American head coach on a permanent basis.

On September 11, 2017, on Monday Night Football, Joseph won his head coaching debut in the 24–21 victory over the Los Angeles Chargers.

Joseph finished his first season as head coach with a 5–11 record and improved to only 6–10 the following year, resulting in back-to-back losing seasons for the Broncos for the first time since the 1971 and 1972 seasons. On December 31, 2018, Joseph was fired by the Broncos.

=== Arizona Cardinals ===
On January 11, 2019, Joseph was hired by the Arizona Cardinals as their defensive coordinator under head coach Kliff Kingsbury.

On October 15, 2021, Kingsbury and several other coaching staff members tested positive for COVID-19. This resulted in Joseph and special teams coordinator Jeff Rodgers taking over as co-interim head coaches for the Cardinals' Week 6 matchup against the Cleveland Browns, and they led the Cardinals to a 37–14 victory.

=== Denver Broncos (second stint) ===
The Broncos re-hired Joseph as their defensive coordinator under new head coach Sean Payton on February 25, 2023.

Following Week 3 of the 2023 season, Joseph was heavily criticized for the defense's performance in a catastrophic road loss to the Miami Dolphins, where the Dolphins scored 70 points (being the first team to do so in a game since 1966, and the fourth team to ever accomplish the feat), as well as racking up 726 yards of total offense (the second-most yards in an NFL game and the most since 1951 in a single game). Many observers and fans subsequently called for his firing over the horrific defensive performance, despite it only being three weeks into the season. However, Payton said that there would be no firings in the wake of the lopsided loss. Five weeks after the 70–20 loss to the Dolphins, the Broncos defense allowed no touchdowns in a 24–9 victory over the defending champion and eventual Super Bowl champion Kansas City Chiefs.

In the 2024 season, Joseph's defense led the league in sacks, ranked third in points allowed, and was seventh in total defense, helping lead to their franchise's first playoff appearance since 2015. Joseph received widespread praise for the defense's significant turnaround from the previous season.

On January 22, 2026, Joseph was named the PFWA Assistant Coach of the Year.

== Head coaching record ==
Team	Year	Regular season					Postseason			
Team	Year	Won	Lost	Ties	Win %	Finish	Won	Lost	Win %	Result
DEN	2017	5	11	0	.313	4th in AFC West	–	–	–	–
DEN	2018	6	10	0	.375	3rd in AFC West	–	–	–	–
Total		11	21	0	.344		0	0	.000	

== Personal life ==
Vance's older brother, Mickey, is a coach and former quarterback currently serving as the head coach at Grambling State. His younger brother, Sammy, played defensive back in the NFL and CFL.

Joseph and his wife, Holly, have two children.

=== Sexual assault allegations ===
In 2004, Joseph was accused of sexually assaulting two female trainers while serving as the defensive backs coach at the University of Colorado. The allegations were investigated by a state task force as part of a massive recruiting scandal that involved multiple women claiming they were raped by football players. Joseph was placed on administrative leave, but after one of the two women involved said she did not want to press charges and the other declined to talk to police, the case was closed and Joseph was not charged. Joseph left the University of Colorado and took a job with Bowling Green shortly afterwards. CU’s then-president said at the time that Joseph was also being investigated for sexual harassment in connection with a different incident in which he had sex with a trainer in a campus athletic facility.

The sexual assault allegations resurfaced in 2017 when Joseph was hired as head coach of the Denver Broncos. Before hiring Joseph, Broncos general manager John Elway conducted an investigation into sexual assault and sexual harassment complaints against Joseph and Joseph was asked directly about the accusations during the interview process. Joseph said that the allegations were false but that he was deeply embarrassed by the sexual harassment incident because he was a married father.
