= Mickey Joseph =

American football player and coach (born 1968)

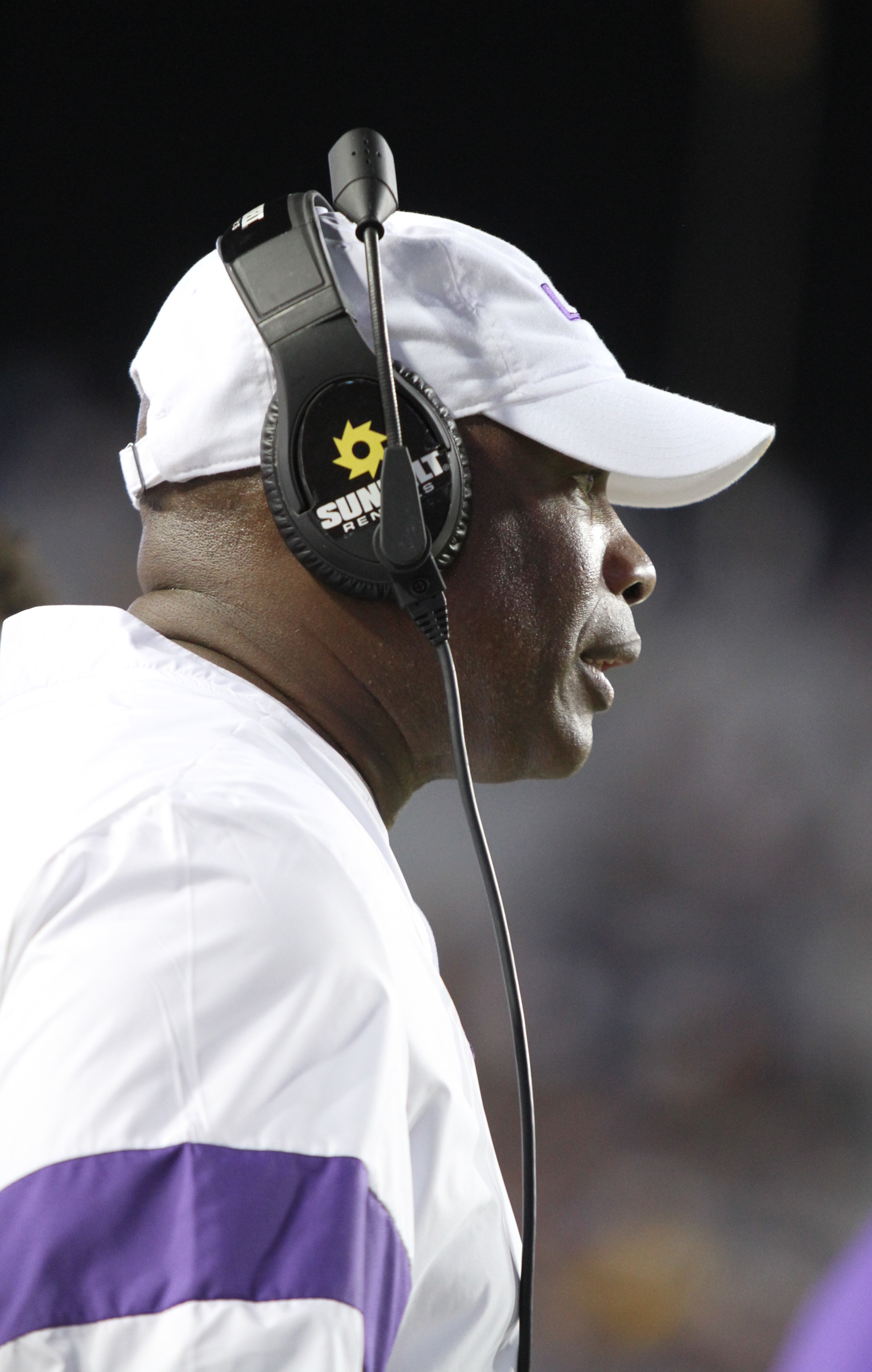

Current position
- Title: Head coach
- Team: Grambling State
- Conference: SWAC
- Record: 12–11

Biographical details
- Born: March 5, 1968 (age 58); Marrero, Louisiana, U.S.

Playing career
- 1988–1991: Nebraska
- 1992*: Hamilton Tiger-Cats
- Position: Quarterback

Coaching career (HC unless noted)
- 1995–1996: Omaha North HS (NE) (QB/WR)
- 1997: Wayne State (NE) (RGC)
- 1998: Archbishop Shaw HS (LA) (QB)
- 1999: Tulane (GA)
- 2000: Alabama State (WR)
- 2001–2003: Nicholls State (QB)
- 2004–2005: Central Oklahoma (RB)
- 2005–2008: Desire Street Academy (LA)
- 2008–2011: Langston (AHC)
- 2011–2012: Langston
- 2013: Alcorn State (AHC/ST/WR)
- 2014–2015: Grambling State (ST/WR)
- 2016: Louisiana Tech (RB)
- 2017–2019: LSU (WR)
- 2020–2021: LSU (AHC/WR)
- 2022: Nebraska (AHC/WR/PGC)
- 2022: Nebraska (interim HC)
- 2024–present: Grambling State

Administrative career (AD unless noted)
- 2005–2008: Desire Street Academy (LA)

Head coaching record
- Overall: 28–24 (college); 19–19 (high school)

Accomplishments and honors

Championships
- 1 National (2019); 1 CSFL (2011)

Robert L. "Mickey" Joseph (born March 5, 1968) is an American college football coach and former player. He is the head football coach for Grambling State University, a position he has held since 2024. He served as the interim head coach at the University of Nebraska in 2022. Joseph was the associate head coach and wide receivers coach at Louisiana State University (LSU) from 2017 to 2021, and was also head football coach at Langston University in Langston, Oklahoma, from 2011 to 2012.

== College football career ==
Joseph attended the University of Nebraska–Lincoln, where he played quarterback for the Nebraska Cornhuskers. The native of Marrero, Louisiana, who attended Archbishop Shaw High School started off his career as a capable backup playing behind starters Steve Taylor and Gerry Gdowski for his freshman and sophomore years. He took over the team as the starter in a two-quarterback system with teammate Mike Grant during Joseph's junior year in 1990. As a starter at Nebraska, he led his team to a 9–2 regular season record in his only season as the team's starting signal caller under the direction of head coach Tom Osborne.

That season, Joseph got Nebraska off to a perfect 8–0 record as expectations in Lincoln, Nebraska, were building up off a No. 3 ranking from the AP Poll. The next game came on November 3, 1990, as Nebraska faced nationally ranked No. 1 Colorado. With 2:38 left in the third quarter of this contest, Joseph connected with his tight end Johnnie Mitchell on a 48-yard touchdown pass to give the Huskers a 12–0 lead. However, Colorado surged ahead by scoring 27 unanswered fourth quarter points to win the game, 27–12.

During the regular season finale on November 23, the dual-threat quarterback suffered a season-ending injury by breaking his leg early in the first quarter of the game with the Oklahoma Sooners in Norman, Oklahoma. Without Joseph, Nebraska lost, 45–10, and struggled in their bowl game. The 1990 Nebraska Cornhuskers finished at 9–3 and ranked No. 24 nationally after a loss in the Florida Citrus Bowl to co-national champion Georgia Tech, 45–21, on January 1, 1991. The 5-foot-10, 175-pound Joseph ran the triple option as an option quarterback. He led Nebraska in passing yards with 624 and completed 34-of-78 passes with 11 touchdowns and six interceptions in 11 games as a junior. He also ran a tailback predicated option offense that included three I-backs—Leodis Flowers, Scott Baldwin, and Derek Brown—that combined for nearly 2,000 rushing yards. Joseph rushed 91 times for 554 yards including 10 touchdowns and recorded a longest run of 70 yards.

Joseph's best single game passing performance came on November 10, 1990, at Kansas in a 41–9 win over the Jayhawks where he completed 7-of-16 passes for 164 yards and threw touchdown passes of 35 and 28 yards to his tight end, Mitchell. Joseph also had 10 rushes for 58 yards. The Husker signal caller's finest single game rushing performance came on October 27, 1990, in a 45–27 blasting of Iowa State at Ames, Iowa. Joseph rushed for 123 yards on eight carries and went 4-for-4 passing the ball for 67 yards that included touchdown passes to Mitchell of 23 and three yards.

Joseph's most productive offensive performance in a single game came on October 13, 1990, in a 69–21 win over Missouri when he accounted for five touchdowns. Joseph had nine rushes for 95 yards and was 4-for-8 passing the ball for 65 yards that included a 10-yard scoring pass to split end Jon Bostick. Joseph also scored on touchdown runs of 15, five, two, and three yards in the contest with the Tigers.

Joseph finished his career at Nebraska the same way it began. He fell down the depth chart after returning from the leg injury for his senior season as Keithen McCant became the Huskers' starting quarterback. McCant went on to win the 1991 Big Eight Offensive Player of the Year Award. For the 1991 season, Joseph passed for 200 yards off 15-of-30 attempts with a touchdown in 11 games. He rushed 26 times for 112 yards and recorded two touchdowns in limited playing time.

Due to his leg injury at Nebraska, Joseph had to forgo playing quarterback for the Hamilton Tiger-Cats of the Canadian Football League where, at 5-foot-10 inches tall and mobile, his skillset would have been suited for the position. Instead, Joseph graduated from Nebraska in 1991 and pursued a teaching and coaching career.

=== College statistics ===
	Passing						Rushing			
YEAR	CMP	ATT	CMP%	YDS	TD	INT	ATT	YDS	AVG	TD
1988	2	4	50.0	16	0	2	24	218	9.1	3
1989	4	12	33.3	69	2	0	39	224	5.7	1
1990	34	78	43.6	624	11	6	91	554	6.1	10
1991	15	30	50.0	200	1	0	26	112	4.3	2
Totals	55	124	44.4	909	14	8	180	1,108	6.2	16

== Coaching career ==
=== Early coaching career ===
From 1995 to 1996, Joseph was quarterbacks and wide receivers coach at Omaha North High School. In 1997, he became running game coordinator at Wayne State College in Wayne, Nebraska. Joseph returned to his alma mater, Archbishop Shaw High School, in 1998 as quarterbacks coach.

In 1999, Joseph became a graduate assistant at Tulane. For the 2000 season, he was wide receivers coach at Alabama State. From 2001 to 2003, Joseph served as quarterbacks coach at Nicholls State University. Starting in 2004, he became running backs coach at Central Oklahoma until 2005.

In 2005, Joseph left college football and took a job in his hometown of New Orleans as a coach, seventh-grade history and gym teacher at Desire Street Academy. This was an all-boys school located in one of the poorest neighborhoods that is in the Ninth Ward of New Orleans, Louisiana. Then in late August 2005, Joseph's school suffered badly from the flooding and other damage caused by Hurricane Katrina forcing Desire Street Academy to relocate some four hours east of New Orleans to a 4-H camp which is located along the Choctawhatchee Bay in Florida.

It was then that Joseph took on a surrogate fatherlike role as he was able to round up 75 of his students from Louisiana and relocate them to the 4-H camp in Florida. This program known as "Florida 4-H Youth Development" was led by former Heisman Trophy winner and Washington Redskins' quarterback, Danny Wuerffel. There, Joseph took care of his students, survivors of Hurricane Katrina, by serving as their dorm resident. "I'm a dorm dad," commented Joseph. "Actually, they say I'm the dorm grandpa, because I'm a supervisor of the dorm dads." Joseph mentored the children who were separated from their families during this period of tribulation in the fall of 2005.

For Joseph, his role was expanded as he found more and more of his time being spent with his displaced students. He made certain they were all in bed by 10:00 pm and was still their teacher as classroom responsibilities fell upon him early in the day. He also had a football team formed from his available student body that finished with a record of 2-1 that fall. When he was interviewed in November 2005, Joseph explained of the harsh realities his children had experienced of how they were traumatized in some way. He explained that some had stayed at the New Orleans Superdome for days. Joseph summarized his students' lives by saying, "They showed a lot of courage to just come here and continue their education, but they're really out of their environment. And I'm going to teach them now living with them. So I've been really able to find out a lot of things about them." Then Joseph added, "I'm literally raising them. So some days are good. Some days are bad ... but there's never a day where you say, 'I want to quit.'"

=== Langston ===
From 2011 to 2013, Joseph was the head coach at Langston University. Joseph had been an assistant coach for the Lions from 2008 to 2011.

=== Alcorn State ===
In 2013, Joseph was the assistant head coach/wide receivers coach and special teams coordinator at Alcorn State.

=== Grambling State ===
In 2014 and 2015, Joseph served as the wide receivers coach and special teams coordinator at Grambling State.

=== Louisiana Tech ===
On January 15, 2016, Joseph was hired as the running backs coach for Louisiana Tech and coached the 2016 season at that position.

=== LSU ===
On February 7, 2017, Joseph was named wide receivers coach at LSU. In 2020, Joseph received the additional title of assistant head coach at LSU.

=== Nebraska ===
In December 2021, it was announced that Joseph would return to his alma mater as the wide receivers coach, associate head coach, and passing game coordinator. After the firing of coach Scott Frost on September 11, 2022, Joseph was named interim head coach. On November 26, 2022, it was announced Matt Rhule had been hired as Nebraska's new head coach for the 2023 season. Four days later, on November 30, Joseph was placed on administrative leave by Athletic Director Trev Alberts following his arrest for domestic violence. His official separation from the university was announced on December 6, 2022.

=== Return to Grambling State ===
On December 18, 2023, Joseph was introduced as the 15th head coach of the Grambling State Tigers.

== Personal life ==
Joseph has six children and is married to Priscilla Joseph. Mickey Joseph's younger brother, Vance, was a quarterback and running back for the Colorado Buffaloes from 1990 to 1995. Vance was hired as head coach of the Denver Broncos on January 11, 2017, after signing a four-year contract. He coached the Broncos through the 2018 season. His other younger brother, Sammy, played defensive back in the National Football League (NFL) and Canadian Football League (CFL).

=== Legal issues ===
On November 30, 2022, Joseph was arrested by the Lincoln Police Department on suspicion of domestic assault and strangulation. Joseph is accused of having pushed his wife, pulled her hair, grabbed her by the throat, and then striking her in the face. Police confirmed that Joseph's wife had trauma marks on her face. He was charged with one felony count of assault by strangulation. The charges against Mickey Joseph were later dropped.

== Head coaching record ==
=== College ===
Year	Team	Overall	Conference	Standing	Bowl/playoffs	NAIA^{#}
Langston Lions (Central States Football League) (2011)
2011	Langston	7–3	4–1	T–1st		23
Langston Lions (NAIA independent) (2012)
2012	Langston	6–4				
Langston:		13–7	4–1			
Nebraska Cornhuskers (Big Ten Conference) (2022)
2022	Nebraska	3–6 (Note: Served as interim head coach after Scott Frost was fired after 3 games.)	3–5	6th (West)		
Nebraska:		3–6	3–5			
Grambling State Tigers (Southwestern Athletic Conference) (2024–present)
2024	Grambling State	5–7	2–6	T–5th (West)		
2025	Grambling State	7–5	4–4	T–3rd (West)		
Grambling State:		12–12	6–10			
Total:		28–25				

=== High school ===
Year	Team	Overall	Conference	Standing	Bowl/playoffs
Desire Street Academy Lions () (2005–2008)
2005	Desire Street Academy	1–3	1–1	2nd	
2006	Desire Street Academy	7–5	3–1	3rd	
2007	Desire Street Academy	7–6	2–3	4th	
2008	Desire Street Academy	4–5	2–3	4th	
Desire Street Academy:		19–19	8–8		
Total:		19–19			
