= Desire Street Academy =

Location
- Louisiana; United States
- 29°59′44″N 90°02′06″W

Information
- Type: Private school
- Opened: 2002
- Grades: 7 to 12
- Colors: Black, Gray, Maroon
- Team name: Lions

Desire Street Academy was a 7–12 private school in New Orleans and later Baton Rouge, Louisiana.

== History ==
The school opened in the upper 9th Ward of New Orleans in 2002. The school was forced to relocate multiple times due to flooding from Hurricane Katrina including moving to Niceville, Florida before settling in Baton Rouge. The school was forced to close due to economic reasons in 2009.

The school was an offshoot of the Desire Street Ministries in New Orleans. Former New Orleans Saints quarterback, Danny Wuerffel, was the school's Development Director.

== Athletics ==
Desire Street Academy athletics competed in the LHSAA. Mickey Joseph was head coach and athletic director at the school.

== Notable alumni ==
- Lavar Edwards, NFL defensive end
- DeAngelo Peterson, NFL tight end
