= St. Charles Catholic High School (Laplace, Louisiana) =

- SCC

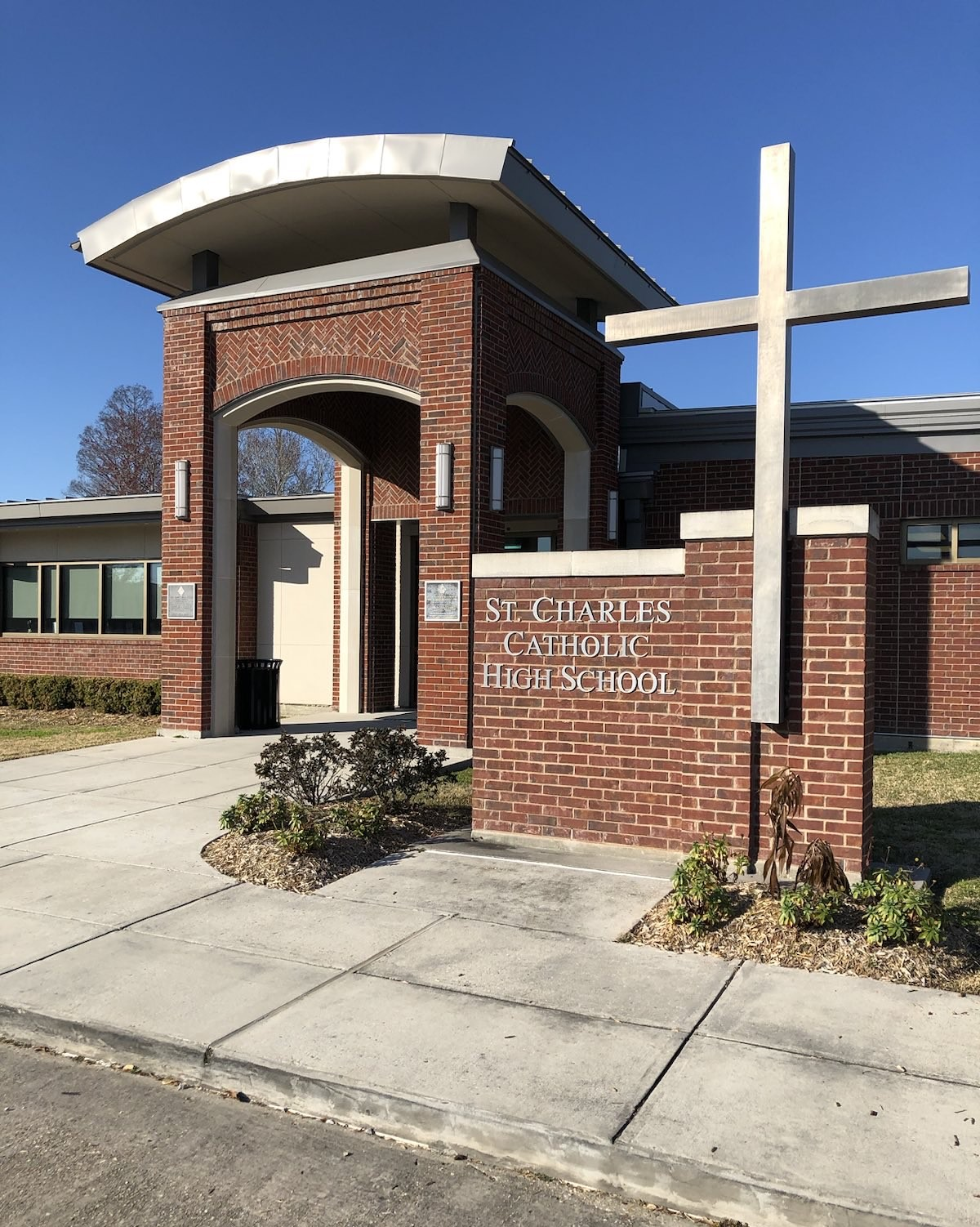

Location
- 100 Dominican Drive; LaPlace, (St. John the Baptist Parish), Louisiana 70068; United States; 30°4′33″N 90°29′41″W

Information
- Type: Private, Coeducational
- Motto: Fly High and Shine Bright
- Religious affiliation: Roman Catholic
- Patron saint: St. Charles Borromeo
- Founded: 1948 in Destrehan; 1978 relocated to LaPlace
- Oversight: Archdiocese New Orleans Office of Education
- School code: 190–690
- Principal: Dr. Courtney Millet (2019 - Present); Andrew Cupit (1989-2019); C.J. Tastet (1983-1989); Sister Sylvia Bourgeois, O.P. (1978-1981)
- Chaplain: Fr. Walter Austin
- Grades: 8–12
- Gender: Male and Female
- Student to teacher ratio: 12:1
- Colors: Blue and Yellow
- Mascot: Charlie Comet
- Team name: Comets
- Rival: Riverside Rebels
- Accreditation: Southern Association of Colleges and Schools
- Website: http://www.stcharlescatholic.org/

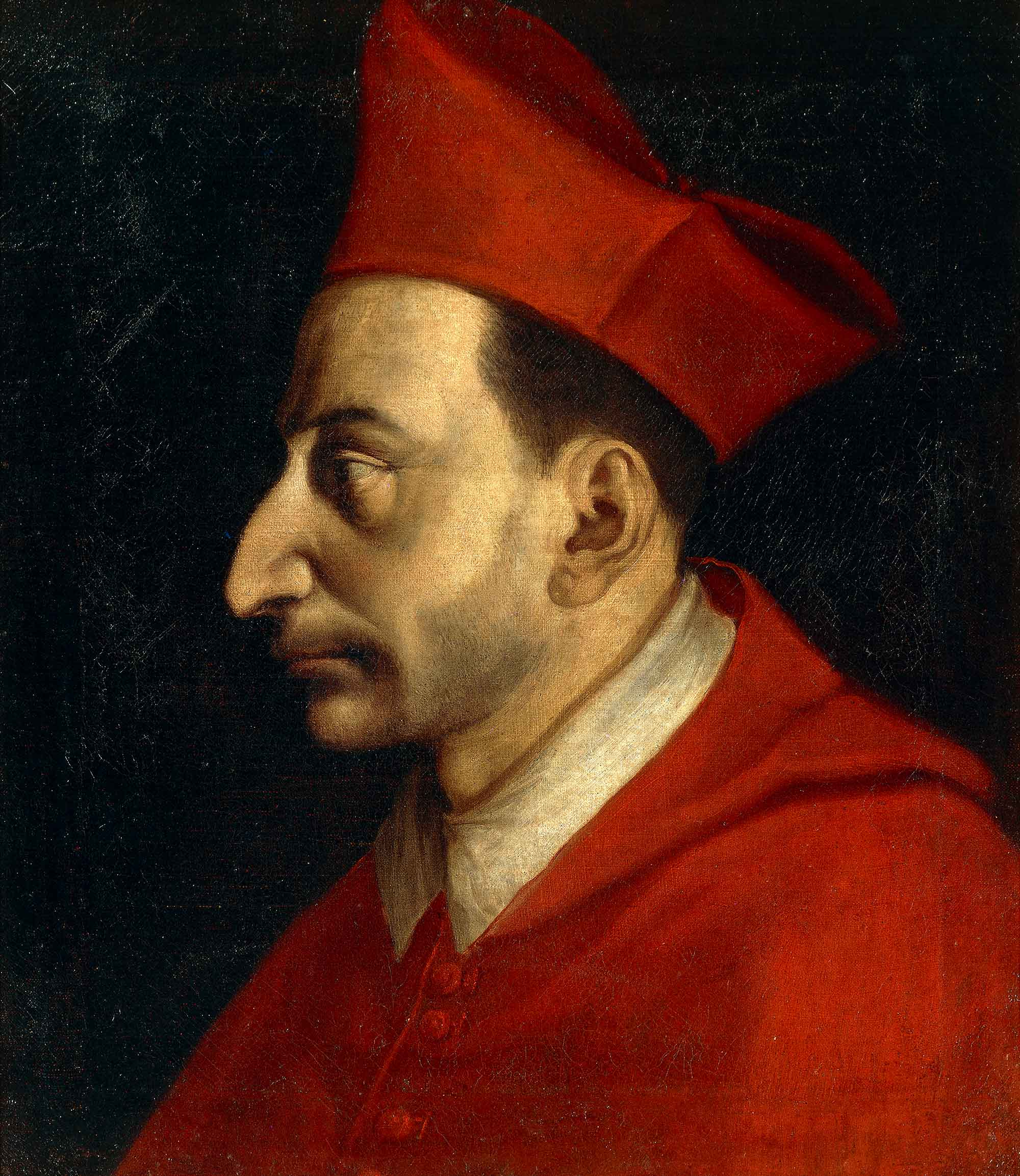
Saint Charles Borromeo

St. Charles Catholic High School is a private, Roman Catholic high school in Laplace, Louisiana. It is located in the Roman Catholic Archdiocese of New Orleans.

== History ==
In 1948, a parochial high school, St. Charles Borromeo High School, opened in Destrehan, Louisiana. The school was located on the grounds of the St. Charles Borromeo Church and was operated by the Sisters of the Congregation of the Immaculate Conception.

In 1960, the Sisters of the Most Holy Sacrament took over operation of the school and in 1978 the high school moved to LaPlace, Louisiana becoming St. Charles Catholic High School.

== Athletics ==
St. Charles Catholic High athletics competes in the LHSAA.

SCC participates in baseball, basketball, cross country, football, golf, powerlifting, soccer, softball, swimming, tennis, track and field, and volleyball.

=== State championships ===
- Football: 2011 (Class 3A), 2021, 2022 (Division III), 2025 (Division II)
- Baseball: 2019 (Division II), 2022, 2023 (Division III)
- Softball: 1998 (Class 2A), 2008 (Class 3A)

== Notable alumni ==
- Tyrell Fenroy, NFL running back
- Curtis Johnson, NFL coach and head football coach at Tulane University

== See also ==
- List of schools in the Roman Catholic Archdiocese of New Orleans
