= Academy of Our Lady (Louisiana) =

The Academy of Our Lady

Location
- 5501 Westbank Expressway; Marrero, Jefferson Parish, Louisiana 70072; United States
- 29°54′6″N 90°5′48″W

Information
- Type: Private, All-Girls
- Religious affiliation: Roman Catholic
- Patron saint: St. Mary Mazzerello
- Established: 2007
- Founder: Merger of Archbishop Blenk High School and Immaculata High School
- Sister school: Archbishop Shaw High School
- School district: 4A District 10
- Dean: Amy Danos
- Administrator: Angela Goyette
- Principal: Sister Michelle Geiger
- Teaching staff: 35
- Grades: 8–12
- Gender: Female
- Enrollment: 341-6217 (2021)
- Average class size: 18-22
- Colors: Carolina blue and silver
- Athletics: LHSAA
- Mascot: Emperor penguin
- Team name: Penguins
- Accreditation: Southern Association of Colleges and Schools
- Newspaper: Penguin Post
- Yearbook: The Fleur De Lis
- Affiliation: Salesian Sisters
- Athletic Director: Ken Marraoccoli
- Website: www.theacademyofourlady.org

The Academy of Our Lady is a private high school for girls on the west bank of Jefferson Parish, Louisiana. It is located in the Roman Catholic Archdiocese of New Orleans.

== Background ==
The Academy of Our Lady was established in August 2007, created from a merger of Archbishop Blenk High School and Immaculata High School. Archbishop Blenk opened in 1962 and Immaculata High School opened in 1956 as part of Immaculate Conception Parish and was served by the school Sisters of Notre Dame until 1979. Now run by the Salesian Sisters, the academy operates a curriculum based on St. John Bosco's education system with a feminine perspective based on the teaching of St. Mary Mazzarello. The current academy is located next to Archbishop Shaw High School, their all boy's counterpart.

== Students ==
Tuition at Academy of Our Lady is $8,450, not including all fees. Students are each given updated IPads. Laptops are also available in the library. School begins at 7:35 and ends at 2:45, students begin coming in around 7:15.

== Academics ==
Academy of Our Lady offers over 100 courses and 74 electives. 98% of its students are eligible for TOPS. It offers five pre-professional programs and institutes; Culinary Arts, Health Care Connections, Civil law, and Engineering Design, and Fine Arts, with focus in choir, piano, theater, or art. The classroom size is 13:1 which makes it better to study. All students have a block schedule (four classes a day). It offers AP, Dual Enrollment, and Honors courses in all subjects.

== Campus ==
Academy of Our Lady is located at 5501 Westbank Expressway Marrero, Louisiana 70072. It is located next to Archbishop Shaw High School, and has been at this address since mid-2014 when the school relocated to the new state-of-the-art campus. It has a gym, library, cafeteria, classroom buildings, and chapel along with a separate Performing Arts building which has a multipurpose room with movable seats so that it can be used as a gallery or auditorium.

The school enjoys its own cafeteria with a hot lunch line, salad bar and private faculty dining room. The school has a commercial-style kitchen, giving the girls more of a restaurant learning experience than the old-fashioned home-ec approach. Students also enjoy a technology hub, where they can learn to troubleshoot computer network problems and fix computers. It hosts an 1,000-seat gym where they hold home sports events and tournaments, a full-size softball field, and a track surrounding the soccer field.

== Athletics ==
Academy of Our Lady athletics competes in the LHSAA.
