= Archbishop Shaw High School =

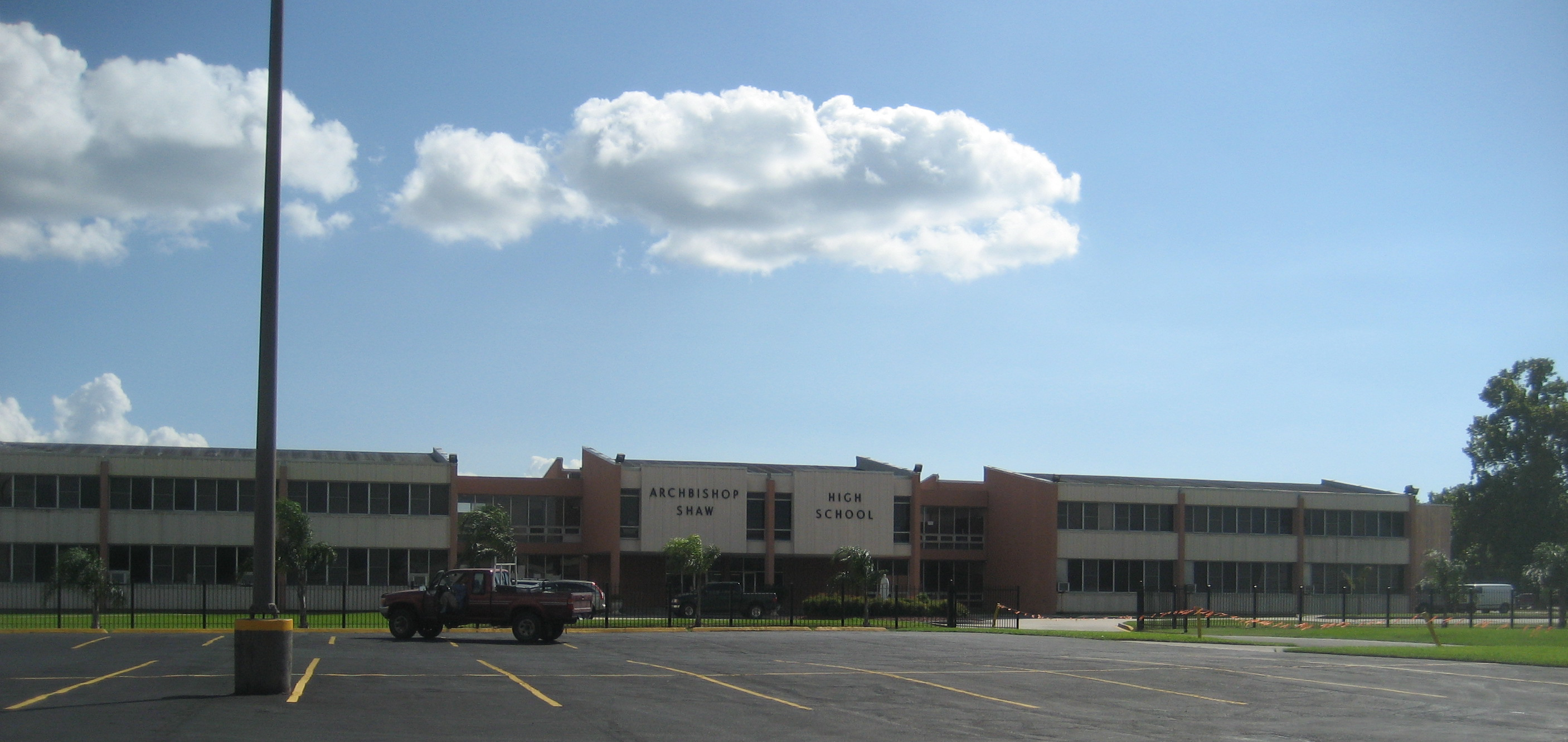

Location
- 1000 Barataria Boulevard; Marrero, Louisiana 70072; United States; 29°53′32″N 90°6′13″W

Information
- Type: Private
- Motto: Excelsior (Ever Striving, Ever Achieving)
- Religious affiliations: Roman Catholic, Salesian
- Established: August 19, 1962
- Founder: Archbishop Joseph Rummel
- Head of school: Fr. Steve Ryan, SDB
- Staff: 55
- Grades: 8–12
- Gender: All-Boys
- Enrollment: 445 (2022)
- Average class size: 19
- Student to teacher ratio: 13:1
- Campus size: 72 acres
- Colors: Green and white
- Athletics conference: Louisiana High School Athletic Association District 10-5A
- Mascot: Eagle
- Team name: Eagles
- Rival: Archbishop Rummel Raiders
- Accreditation: Southern Association of Colleges and Schools
- Newspaper: The Eagle Times
- Yearbook: The Talon
- School fees: $1,000 (2026-2027) - Registration $200 - (2026-2027) - Senior Fee
- Tuition: $10,300 (2026-2027)
- Athletic Director: Tom Alef
- Website: www.archbishopshaw.org

Archbishop Shaw High School is an archdiocesan school administered under the Salesians of Don Bosco. It is approved by the Louisiana State Department of Education and the Southern Association of Secondary Schools and Colleges. Founded in 1962, it is located in Marrero, Louisiana, and is part of the Roman Catholic Archdiocese of New Orleans.

== History ==
Archbishop John W. Shaw, whose leadership of the Archdiocese New Orleans ran from 1918 to 1934, had a special interest in the Catholic community of the West Bank. During this time, many churches and schools were founded. In that time, Hope Haven Institute, an orphanage and foster home for boys was founded and the Salesians of Don Bosco were asked to staff it.

The mission of the Salesians is to serve the poor and the young through the Preventive System of John Bosco in light of the gospel and Jesus Christ. In 1962 Archbishop Joseph Rummel of New Orleans dedicated a new high school on the West Bank and named it in honor of Shaw. The school was built on the same 70-acre plot of land that was used by Hope Haven.

Paul Avallone was the school's founding principal. Originally, only a small complex was built to meet the needs of the developing West Bank. Every year the school continued to grow in both admissions and infrastructure. While Archbishop Shaw High School is the only school for boys on the West Bank, it also attracts students from all over southeast Louisiana.

== Origins ==
The West Bank of Jefferson Parish did not have any Catholic High Schools prior to 1955, when Immaculate Conception parish of Marrero added Immaculata High School. It was envisioned to provide Catholic secondary education as an all-girls institution. However, the absence of an alternative for boys prompted parents to request admission of their sons. Immaculata accommodated and began admitting boys. By 1959, Immaculata High School was fully established, graduating its first class of Seniors in 1960.

Responding to the rapid suburban growth of the New Orleans area, the New Orleans Archdiocese proceeded with the development of four new high schools to be established in Jefferson Parish, two on the west bank of the Mississippi River and two on the east bank. These included Archbishop Shaw for boys in Marrero; Archbishop Blenk for girls in Gretna; Archbishop Rummel for boys in Metairie; and Archbishop Chapelle for girls in Metairie.

Archbishop Shaw High School began classes in August 1962, admitting only freshman 9th grade students, all boys. Immaculata High School continued to provide secondary education for boys and girls, but the boys were phased out one class per year as Shaw added each successive grade. When Shaw opened, a number of male faculty members moved from Immaculata. Immaculata continued to graduate co-ed classes until 1966, when the final nine boys reached commencement. The first graduating class of Shaw was in 1965, so for two years boys graduated from both high schools. After 1966, Immaculata continued as an all-girls secondary school.

== Facilities ==
The campus of Archbishop Shaw was at first partially developed to accommodate a singular incoming class of freshman 9th grade students. Ground was broken in October 1961, and included two annex buildings and a cafeteria. Construction was completed in time for the 1962–1963 school year and the new school was dedicated on August 19, 1962. Ceremonies were officiated by Archbishop Francis Rummel and Archbishop John Cody.

In 1965, the first major expansion of the campus facilities began. The project included a main building facing the West Bank Expressway with 12 classrooms, an administrative area, science laboratories and library and a separate gymnasium. In all, the additions were an investment of over $1.1 million (U.S.) raised by the United Catholic Education Fund.

The school has expanded in the past 50 years to contain 4 academic buildings, 4 sport facilities (football, soccer, baseball, and wrestling), as well as a swimming pool.

== The anchor ==
Archbishop Shaw has historically incorporated an anchor in its logos, crests and insignias. Once established, the school organized a Navy Junior Reserve Officer Training Corps (NJROTC) that participated in local parades and competitions, adopting the name "Sea Eagles." The anchor was acquired by Edward Zammit who was a Marine and a WW2 vet in the Pacific war campaign. He did this for the Eagles because his son Eric Zammit was an original member of the (NJROTC) program and became an All-American football player for the Eagles. In 1972, two of its members were selected for Navy Reserve Officer Training Corps scholarships at the collegiate level. They were also named first and second alternate appointments to the U.S. Naval Academy in Annapolis.

In the 1976–1977 school year, the unit consisted of 53 cadets, 22 of which were on the drill team, under the direction of Lt. Cmdr. Hillary G. Parrish. Though the unit was successful, winning 17 awards in professional competitions that year, it was disbanded due to regulations that required a minimum of 100 members.

== Athletics ==
Archbishop Shaw athletics competes in the LHSAA.

=== Championships ===
Bowling championships

- (3) State Championships: 2009, 2024, 2025 (Class 4A)

Football championships

- (2) State Championships: 1987 (Class 4A), 2024 (Division II Select)

Boys' Basketball championships

- (1) State Championship: 1988–89 (Class 4A)

=== Coaches ===
- Hank Tierney - Coach Tierney was head coach at Archbishop Shaw from 1983 to 2001 and again starting with the 2022 season. During his nineteen seasons at Archbishop Shaw in his first stint as head coach, he compiled a 185–48–0 record and won twelve New Orleans Catholic League championships and won a state championship in 1987 with three state runners-up in 1988, 1997, and 2000. In 2024, in his third season after returning to Archbishop Shaw, Tierney won his second state championship winning the LHSAA Division II Select title.

In the 2021 season, Tierney reached three hundred overall wins during his career at Archbishop Shaw and also at West Jefferson High School (36–27–0 in six seasons) from 2002 to 2007 and Ponchatoula High School (79–45–0 in eleven seasons) from 2011 to 2021 with a state runners-up in 2021.

- Joe Zimmerman - Coach Zimmerman served as head coach for 14 seasons from 1969 to 1982. The on-campus football stadium is named after Zimmerman.

=== Athletic facilities ===
Archbishop Shaw has four on-campus sports facilities. A stadium for football, lacrosse and soccer. Additional facilities include a gymnasium for basketball and wrestling, a baseball field and swimming pool.

==== Joe Zimmerman Stadium ====
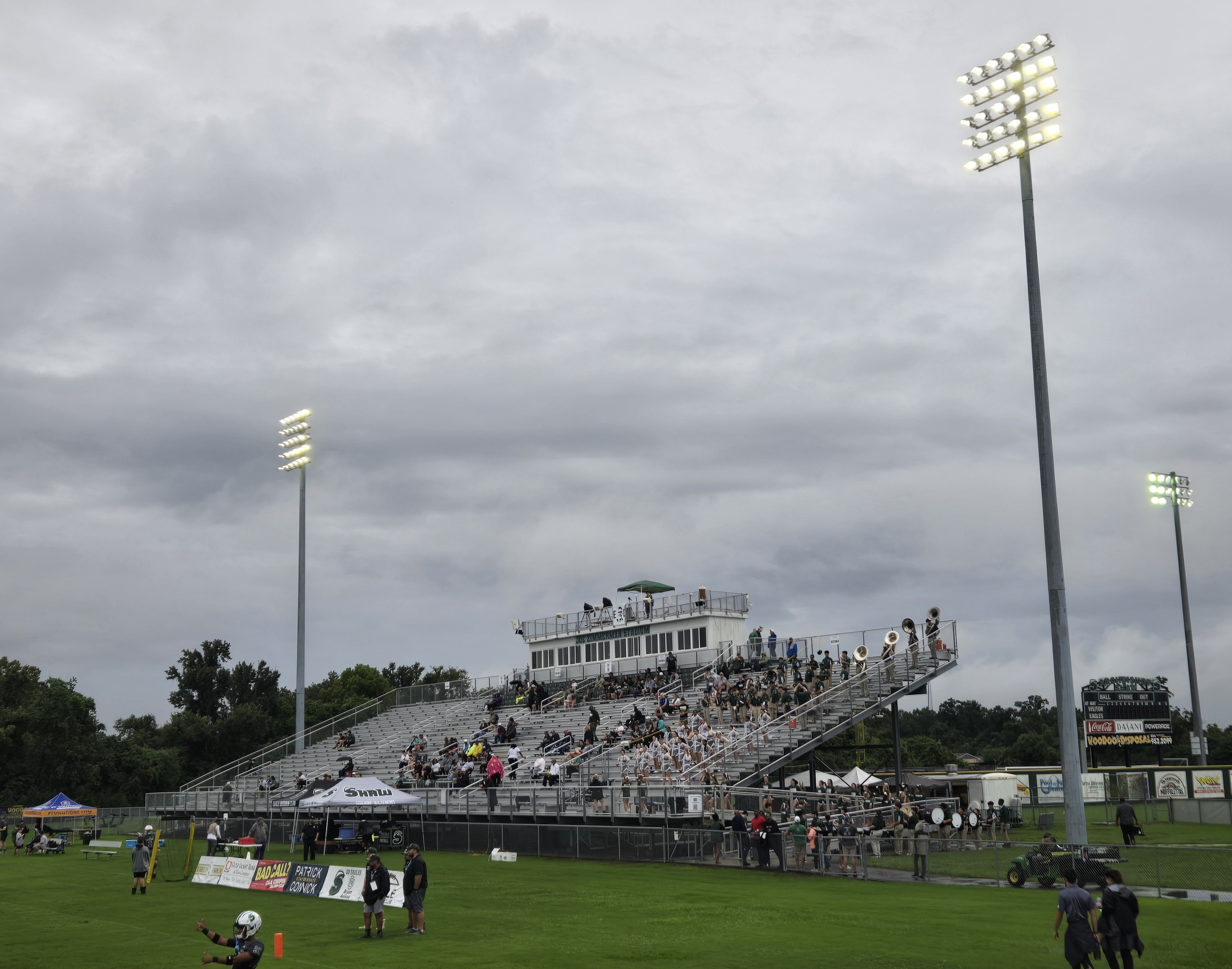
Joe Zimmerman Stadium

Joe Zimmerman Stadium is a 3,000-seat natural turf football/multipurpose stadium located on the campus of Archbishop Shaw. It is the home stadium for Archbishop Shaw athletics in addition to hosting sporting events for multiple area schools. Football, flag football, lacrosse, rugby and soccer are played at the stadium.

Groundbreaking for the stadium, originally named Archbishop Shaw High School Stadium, took place on November 1, 2017. The stadium opened in 2018 and was later renamed Joe Zimmerman Stadium on September 13, 2019 after the former Archbishop Shaw head football coach.

== Notable alumni ==
- Steve Mott – Former NFL Center Detroit Lions - Last Team Captain under Bear Bryant University of Alabama Crimson Tide
- Bobby Barbier – head baseball coach of the Southeastern Louisiana Lions
- Darren Barbier – head football coach at Nicholls State University
- Ron Bellamy – retired NFL wide receiver and wide receivers coach for the Michigan Wolverines
- Gary Carter, Jr. – Member of Louisiana House of Representatives from Algiers neighborhood of New Orleans
- Ryan Clark – current NFL analyst at ESPN, retired NFL free safety, Pittsburgh Steelers and Washington Redskins
- Patrick Connick – state representative for Jefferson Parish
- John Fourcade – retired NFL quarterback
- Ronnie Harris - former mayor of Gretna, Louisiana
- Tory James – retired NFL cornerback
- Mickey Joseph – head football coach of the Nebraska Cornhuskers and wide receivers coach for the LSU Tigers
- Sammy Joseph – running backs coach for the Nicholls Colonels
- Vance Joseph – Defensive Coordinator of the Denver Broncos
- Pat Riley – former NFL defensive end for the Chicago Bears
