= St. Christopher's School (Metairie, Louisiana) =

St. Christopher School

Location
- 3900 Derbigny St; Metairie, Louisiana 70001; United States
- Coordinates: 29°58′36″N 90°10′13″W

Information
- Denomination: Roman Catholic
- Established: 1949
- Oversight: Archdiocese of New Orleans
- Principal: Rachel Trahan
- Teaching staff: 22.6 (on an FTE basis)
- Grades: PK–7
- Gender: Co-Ed
- Enrollment: 514 (2019–20)
- Student to teacher ratio: 16.1
- Nickname: SCS
- Team name: Thoroughbreds
- Website: https://stchristopherschool.org/

Saint Christopher School is an elementary school located in Metairie, Louisiana. The school teaches children from kindergarten to seventh grade. Saint Christopher is recognized by the United States Department of Education as a National School of Excellence and was named a Blue Ribbon School for the 1993–1994 school year.
