= Immaculata High School (Marrero, Louisiana) =

Defunct private high school in Louisiana, USA

Location
- Marrero, Louisiana; United States; 29.901321°N 90.096758°W

Information
- Type: Private, Coeducational
- Religious affiliation: Roman Catholic
- Established: 1956
- Closed: 2007
- Grades: 9-12
- Website: immaculatahigh.org

Immaculata High School was a Catholic high school in Marrero, Louisiana.

Immaculata High School opened in 1956 as a part of Immaculate Conception Parish. Immaculata answered a growing need for Catholic secondary education on the Westbank. Located in the Roman Catholic Archdiocese of New Orleans, the School Sisters of Notre Dame served Immaculata from its inception until May 1979. In August 1979, the Salesian Sisters came to Immaculata. The founding pastor, Msgr. Paul Gaudin, envisioned a girls' school. At the time, however, the absence of a boys' Catholic High School in the area prompted parents to seek admission also for their sons.

On September 10, 1956, Immaculata High School opened its doors to 50 freshmen. In 1960, 24 students comprised the first graduating class; the total enrollment was 188 in that year. Immaculata continued as a co-ed school until the opening of Archbishop Shaw High School in 1962. Archbishop Shaw began with only a Freshman class of 9th grade boys and added successive grades each year thereafter. Immaculata phased out the admission of boys within each grade that Archbishop Shaw accommodated, until 1966, when Immaculata awarded diplomas to the last 9 boys to attend the school.

== Immaculata/Archbishop Blenk Merger ==
In 2007, Immaculata High School and Archbishop Blenk High School, both located on the West Bank, were merged. The merged school is called The Academy of Our Lady. Alumni, parents of students, and students protested against this merge. One group of concerned parents, students, and alumni created a website called Stop The Merger to pass along information in the hope of preventing the merge of Archbishop Blenk and Immaculata. The new school, like Immaculata, is run by the Salesian Sisters.
