= Archbishop Blenk High School =

Location
- Gretna, (Jefferson Parish), Louisiana; 29.910794°N 90.045548°W

Information
- Type: Private, All-Female
- Religious affiliation: Roman Catholic
- Established: 1962
- Closed: 2007
- Grades: 8-12
- Website: https://web.archive.org/*/http://www.blenkhs.org

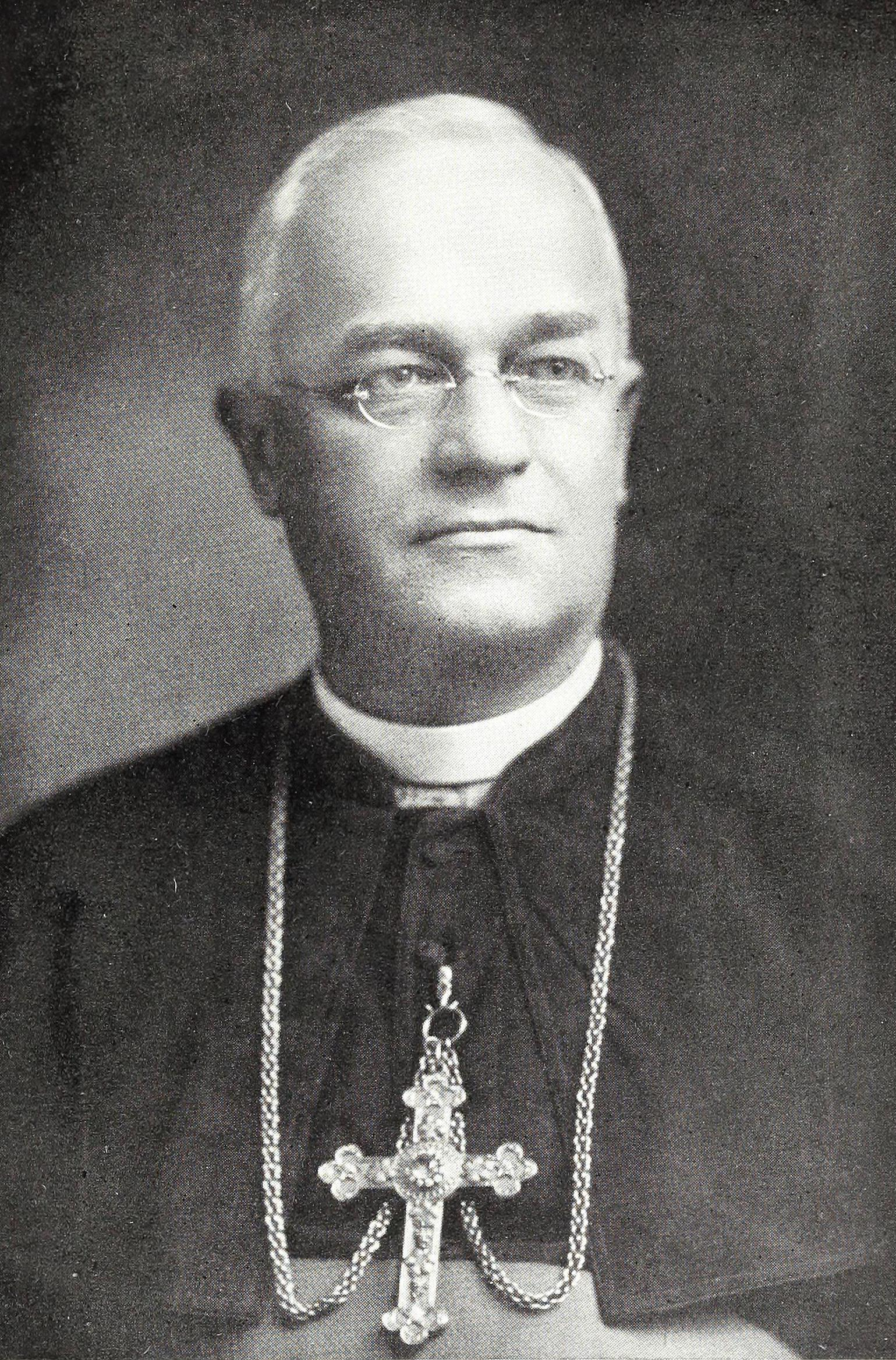
Archbishop James Blenk

Archbishop Blenk High School was an all girl Catholic high school in Gretna, Louisiana. The school was located on the West Bank of Jefferson Parish. Located in the Roman Catholic Archdiocese of New Orleans, the school was founded in 1962, named after Archbishop James Blenk, and staffed by the Marianites of Holy Cross. Blenk's school colors were blue and gray and proud home to the doves, their mascot.

The school has been accredited by the Southern Association of Colleges and Schools since 1975.

== Blenk/Immaculata merge ==
The Archdiocese of New Orleans has announced that after the 2006–2007 school year, Archbishop Blenk and Immaculata High School, both located on the West Bank, will merge. The new school will be called The Academy of Our Lady. Alumni, parents of students, and students have protested against this merger. One group of concerned parents, students and alumni have created a web site called Stop The Merger to pass along information in the hope of preventing the merger of Archbishop Blenk and Immaculata. The new school, like Immaculata, will be run by the Salesian Sisters.

The Times-Picayune reported on January 4, 2007: "Reversing course for the third time in less than a year, the Archdiocese of New Orleans will close the 46-year-old Archbishop Blenk High School in Gretna at the end of the school year and shift its students to Immaculata High in Marrero. Under a plan announced last spring, students at both schools would have been consolidated at Blenk’s Gretna Boulevard campus, and Immaculata closed, until construction of a new all-girls Catholic school on the West Bank. Then, a second plan to retain both campuses under a new name was announced in October."

The Blenk building was remodeled and used for a new magnet school, named Thomas Jefferson High School. Since the magnet school is public, all religious figures and statues were removed from campus.

== Awards and recognition ==
During the 1994–98 period, Archbishop Blenk High School was recognized with the Blue Ribbon School Award of Excellence by the United States Department of Education, the highest award an American school can receive.
