= Holy Rosary School (New Orleans) =

- Holy Rosary
- Sanctus Rosary Altus Schola

Location
- 2437 Jena Street, New Orleans, Louisiana 70115 USA; Former address: 2545 Bayou Road; 3368 Esplanade Avenue New Orleans, Louisiana 70119
- 29.9350°N 90.1037°W

Information
- Type: Private, Coeducational
- Religious affiliation: Roman Catholic
- Denomination: Roman Catholic
- Patron saint: Our Lady of the Most Holy Rosary
- Established: 2005
- Founder: Father James A. Tarantino
- Closed: 2019
- Superintendent: Sr. Kathleen Finnerty, OSU,
- Dean: Byron Q. Iverson
- Rector: Very Reverend David J. Robicheaux, V.F.
- Principal: Leonard Enger
- Chaplain: Very Reverend David J. Robicheaux, V.F.
- Grades: K–12
- Gender: Co-ed
  - Grade 10: 17
  - Grade 11: 15
  - Grade 12: 20
- Hours in school day: 7 Hours
- Classrooms: English
- Colors: Navy Blue, Silver and White
- Athletics: Lhsaa
- Mascot: Bulldog
- Team name: Bulldogs
- Accreditation: Southern Association of Colleges and Schools
- Newspaper: The Bulldog Bark
- Tuition: $10,500
- Athletic Director: Nick Arccardo
- Website: http://www.hra-hrhs.org

Holy Rosary Academy and High School was a private, Roman Catholic K-12 school in New Orleans, Louisiana, United States. It was located in the Roman Catholic Archdiocese of New Orleans.

It was in Uptown New Orleans.

== Background ==
Holy Rosary High School also educated students with learning disabilities such as dyslexia, dysgraphia, language delay, academic anxiety, and/or Attention Deficit Disorder.

== History ==
Holy Rosary High School was established in 2005 at 3368 Esplanade Avenue near City Park. The school opened its doors to 33 students, of whom 28 returned following Hurricane Katrina. In 2010, the school had up to 150 students. In 2012, the school moved to 2437 Jena St. in New Orleans.

In the 2014–2015 school year, it had 159 students. By 2019 this declined to 110.

In 2019 the archdiocese announced that it was closing in 2019, along with a special education school in Metairie, Our Lady of Divine Providence School. St. Thérèse Academy for Exceptional Learners in Metairie was established that year to replace the two schools.
