= John T. Curtis Jr. =

American football coach

John Thomas "J.T." Curtis Jr. (born 1947) is an American high school football coach for John Curtis Christian School. In 2023, he broke John McKissick’s record of 621 wins, securing his 622nd win against nationally recognized Edna Karr High School. In 2010, he was inducted into the Louisiana Sports Hall of Fame and in 2015, he was inducted into the National High School Hall of Fame.

As of September 22, 2026, his coaching record stands at 642 wins, 88 losses, and 6 ties in over 54 seasons.

== Family ==
J.T. had three children with his late wife, Lydia. His eldest daughter, Joanna Fabacher, is married to Tommy Fabacher. They have two daughters, Reaghan and Rylee Fabacher. His son-in-law (Tommy) serves as an assistant coach at John Curtis.

J.T.’s second child is his son, John Thomas Curtis III (Johnny), who is married to, Dawn. They have three sons: John Thomas Curtis IV (Jay), Michael, and Jason. Johnny currently serves as Special Teams Coordinator at John Curtis and has previously served on staff at Ball State. Jay is also an assistant coach at John Curtis and Jason serves as a student assistant coach at LSU.

J.T.’s third child is Jeffrey (Jeff), who is also married and has five children: Anna, Abbi, Jeffrey Jr., Avery, and Jackson.

It was important to J.T.'s late wife, Lydia, to have a close-knit family, and in many photographs, he has one of his children or grandchildren by his side. J.T. has his sons and son-in-law serve as his assistant coaches over the past 30 years.

== Early life ==
Curtis is a native of New Orleans, Louisiana. He graduated from East Jefferson High School in Metairie, Louisiana in 1966, where he was an all-state and All-American offensive lineman for the school's football team. Curtis attended the University of Arkansas on a football scholarship for three years before transferring to Louisiana College in 1968, where he continued to play football.

== Coaching career ==
Curtis' father, John T. Curtis, Sr., founded John Curtis Christian School in River Ridge, Louisiana, in 1962, where he was named head football coach in 1969 at the age of 22. In his first season, the Patriots football team finished the year 0-10 and scored only two touchdowns the entire season. The following season, the Patriots made the playoffs, and by 1973, they had made their first appearance in the LHSAA quarterfinals. In 1975, Curtis led his team to the school's first football state championship, defeating Notre Dame High School of Crowley, Louisiana by a score of 13-12.

The team has won 28 state championships to date, the most of any high school football program in Louisiana history, far surpassing the team with the second-most championships, Haynesville High School in Haynesville, Louisiana, which holds 17 state championships.

J.T. Curtis is currently the winningest high school football coach in Louisiana history and the winningest American football coach in history. He achieved his 600th win, becoming only the second coach in the nation to ever do so, with a 37-16 win over Archbishop Shaw High School in 2021.

In 2012, the John Curtis football program was named the national champion by five national polls after going undefeated at 14-0 and defeating Evangel Christian Academy of Shreveport, Louisiana 35-13 in the LHSAA Class 2A state championship game. It was the first ever national title for Curtis and the Patriots football program and the first by a team from Louisiana since West Monroe High School was named national champion in 2000. The Patriots are also the only team from Louisiana to receive the honor since. In 2013, the Patriots football program was forced to forfeit 20 wins from 2013 to 2015, including their 2013 state championship, due to sanctions by the LHSAA around the eligibility of now former JCCS football player Willie Allen. Curtis and the school have maintained to date that there were no improprieties regarding Allen.

In his storied career, Curtis has coached 14 players who played in the NFL including Joe McKnight, Malachi Dupre, Duke Riley, Kenny Young, and Mike Stonebreaker among others. He has also coached dozens of high school All-Americans and players who went on to compete on the college level. He also had at least one player named first-team all-state every year from 1975 to 2019, a state record. The Patriots won five consecutive state championships, the only team in Louisiana to ever do so, from 2004 to 2008. They have also won four consecutive titles once (1996–99) and three consecutive titles twice (1979–81, 1983–85).

He has also won three state championships as the head baseball coach at John Curtis.

== Head coaching record ==
Year	Team	Regular Season	District	Standing	Playoff	Overall	Finish
John Curtis Christian School (1969–present)
1969	John Curtis	0-10	-	-	0-0	0-10	Missed Playoffs
1970	John Curtis	-	-	-	0-1	-	L LSHAA 1A Regional
1971	John Curtis	-	-	-	0-0	-	Missed Playoffs
1972	John Curtis	-	-	-	0-0	-	Missed Playoffs
1973	John Curtis	-	-	-	2-1	-	L LSHAA 2A Quarterfinal
1974	John Curtis	-	-	-	0-0	-	Missed Playoffs
1975	John Curtis	-	-	1st	5-0	-	W LSHAA 2A Final
1976	John Curtis	-	-	1st	4-1	-	L LSHAA 2A Final
1977	John Curtis	-	-	-	5-0	-	W LSHAA 2A Final
1978	John Curtis	-	-	1st	3-1	-	L LSHAA 2A Semifinal
1979	John Curtis	-	-	1st	5-0	-	W LSHAA 2A Final
1980	John Curtis	-	-	1st	5-0	-	W LSHAA 2A Final
1981	John Curtis	-	-	1st	5-0	-	W LSHAA 2A Final
1982	John Curtis	-	-	1st	4-1	-	L LSHAA 2A Final
1983	John Curtis	-	-	1st	5-0	-	W LSHAA 2A Final
1984	John Curtis	-	-	1st	5-0	-	W LSHAA 2A Final
1985	John Curtis	-	-	1st	5-0	-	W LSHAA 3A Final
1986	John Curtis	-	-	1st	4-1	-	L LSHAA 3A Final
1987	John Curtis	-	-	1st	5-0	-	W LSHAA 3A Final
1988	John Curtis	-	-	1st	5-0	-	W LSHAA 3A Final
1989	John Curtis	-	-	1st	2-1	-	L LSHAA 3A Quarterfinal
1990	John Curtis	-	-	1st	5-0	-	W LSHAA 3A Final
1991	John Curtis	-	-	1st	2-1	-	L LSHAA 4A Quarterfinal
1992	John Curtis	-	-	1st	1-1	-	L LSHAA 4A Regional
1993	John Curtis	-	-	1st	5-0	-	W LSHAA 4A Final
1994	John Curtis	-	-	1st	4-1	-	L LSHAA 4A Final
1995	John Curtis	-	-	1st	2-1	-	L LSHAA 4A Quarterfinal
1996	John Curtis	-	-	1st	5-0	-	W LSHAA 4A Final
1997	John Curtis	-	-	1st	5-0	-	W LSHAA 4A Final
1998	John Curtis	-	-	1st	5-0	-	W LSHAA 4A Final
1999	John Curtis	-	-	1st	5-0	-	W LSHAA 4A Final
2000	John Curtis	-	-	1st	4-1	-	L LSHAA 4A Final
2001	John Curtis	-	-	-	5-0	-	W LSHAA 4A Final
2002	John Curtis	-	-	1st	5-0	-	W LSHAA 4A Final
2003	John Curtis	-	-	1st	4-1	-	L LSHAA 4A Final
2004	John Curtis	9-0	3-0	1st	5-0	14-0	W LSHAA 4A Final
2005**	John Curtis	5-1	4-0	1st	5-0	10-1	W LSHAA 2A Final
2006	John Curtis	9-0	4-0	1st	5-0	14-0	W LSHAA 2A Final
2007	John Curtis	7-2	3-1	2nd	5-0	12-2	W LSHAA 2A Final
2008	John Curtis	9-1	4-0	1st	5-0	14-1	W LSHAA 2A Final
2009	John Curtis	9-0	7-0	1st	4-1	13-1	L LSHAA 2A Final
2010	John Curtis	8-1	6-0	1st	4-1	12-2	L LSHAA 2A Final
2011	John Curtis	9-0	6-0	1st	5-0	14-0	W LSHAA 2A Final
2012	John Curtis	9-0	6-0	1st	5-0	14-0	W LSHAA 2A Final^{#}
2013	John Curtis	8-2	4-0	1st	3-0	11-2	W LSHAA DII Final
2014	John Curtis	9-1	4-0	1st	2-1	11-2	L LSHAA DI Final
2015	John Curtis	7-2	4-2	3rd	1-1	8-3	L LSHAA DI Semifinal
2016	John Curtis	9-0	6-0	1st	1-1	10-1	L LSHAA DI Semifinal
2017	John Curtis	9-1	6-0	1st	2-1	11-2	L LSHAA DI Final
2018	John Curtis	10-0	6-0	1st	3-0	13-0	W LSHAA DI Final
2019	John Curtis	9-1	5-1	2nd	1-1	10-2	L LSHAA DI Semifinal
2020**	John Curtis	5-3	3-2	4th	2-1^	7-4^	L LSHAA DI Semifinal
2021**	John Curtis	4-3	4-2	3rd	1-1	5-4	L LSHAA DI Quarterfinal
2022	John Curtis	8-2	5-1	2nd	4-0	12-2	W LSHAA DI Select Final
2023	John Curtis	7-2	4-2	3rd	1-1	8-3	L LSHAA DI Select Quarterfinal
2024	John Curtis	4-5	3-4	5th	3-1	7-6	L LSHAA DI Select Semifinal
2025	John Curtis	7-2	5-2	3rd	2-1	9-3	L LSHAA DI Select Semifinal
2026	John Curtis	1-1	-	-	-	1-1	
John Curtis		-	-	-	195-24	640-91-6	
Total:		-	-	-	-	640-90-6	
*Hurricane Katrina shortened season; **Covid-19 shortened season; ^{#}National Champion; ^Includes forfeits; ^^Relinquished

== Awards, recognition, records ==
- Most Consecutive State Championships (5)
- Most Consecutive State Title Game Appearances (14)
- Most Consecutive Games Without Being Shut Out (303) (National Record)
- 28x LHSAA Football State Champion
- 3x LHSAA Baseball State Champion
- 9x LFCA Coach of the Year
- 6x LSWA Coach of the Year
- 1964 Parade High School Football All-American
- 1992 inductee to the Louisiana High School Sports Hall of Fame
- 1994 inductee to the Louisiana Christian University Athletic Hall of Fame
- 2010 inductee to the Louisiana Sports Hall of Fame
- 2015 inductee to the National High School Hall of Fame
- Named 1980s Coach of the Decade by the National Sports Foundation

== State Championships ==
- 1975 LHSAA Class 2A (defeated Notre Dame, 13-12)
- 1977 LHSAA Class 2A (defeated Jonesboro-Hodge, 45-0)
- 1979 LHSAA Class 2A (defeated Patterson, 28-0)
- 1980 LHSAA Class 2A (defeated Jonesboro-Hodge, 21-3)
- 1981 LHSAA Class 2A (defeated E.D. White Catholic, 21-17
- 1983 LHSAA Class 2A (defeated Belle Chasse, 38-0)
- 1984 LHSAA Class 2A (defeated Ferriday, 23-7)
- 1985 LHSAA Class 3A (defeated Wossman, 28-0)
- 1987 LHSAA Class 3A (defeated Amite, 27-14)
- 1988 LHSAA Class 3A (defeated Washington-Marion, 14-7)
- 1990 LHSAA Class 3A (defeated Washington-Marion, 42-13)
- 1993 LHSAA Class 4A (defeated Wossman, 42-14)
- 1996 LHSAA Class 4A (defeated Crowley, 28-7)
- 1997 LHSAA Class 4A (defeated Eunice, 21-6)
- 1998 LHSAA Class 4A (defeated Eunice, 20-7)
- 1999 LHSAA Class 4A (defeated Capitol, 16-0)
- 2001 LHSAA Class 4A (defeated Baker, 30-0)
- 2002 LHSAA Class 4A (defeated O.P. Walker, 16-14)
- 2004 LHSAA Class 4A (defeated Northside, 29-14)
- 2005 LHSAA Class 2A (defeated St. Charles Catholic, 31-6
- 2006 LHSAA Class 2A (defeated St. Charles Catholic, 41-7
- 2007 LHSAA Class 2A (defeated St. James, 28-13)
- 2008 LHSAA Class 2A (defeated Evangel Christian, 35-14)
- 2011 LHSAA Class 2A (defeated Winnfield, 33-3)
- 2012 LHSAA Class 2A (defeated Evangel Christian, 35-13
- 2013 LHSAA Division II (defeated University Lab, 32-0) (Later forfeited)
- 2018 LHSAA Division I (defeated Catholic-Baton Rouge, 49-7)
- 2022 LHSAA Division I Select (defeated Brother Martin, 23-0)
