= East Jefferson High School =

Public high school in Metairie, Louisiana, US

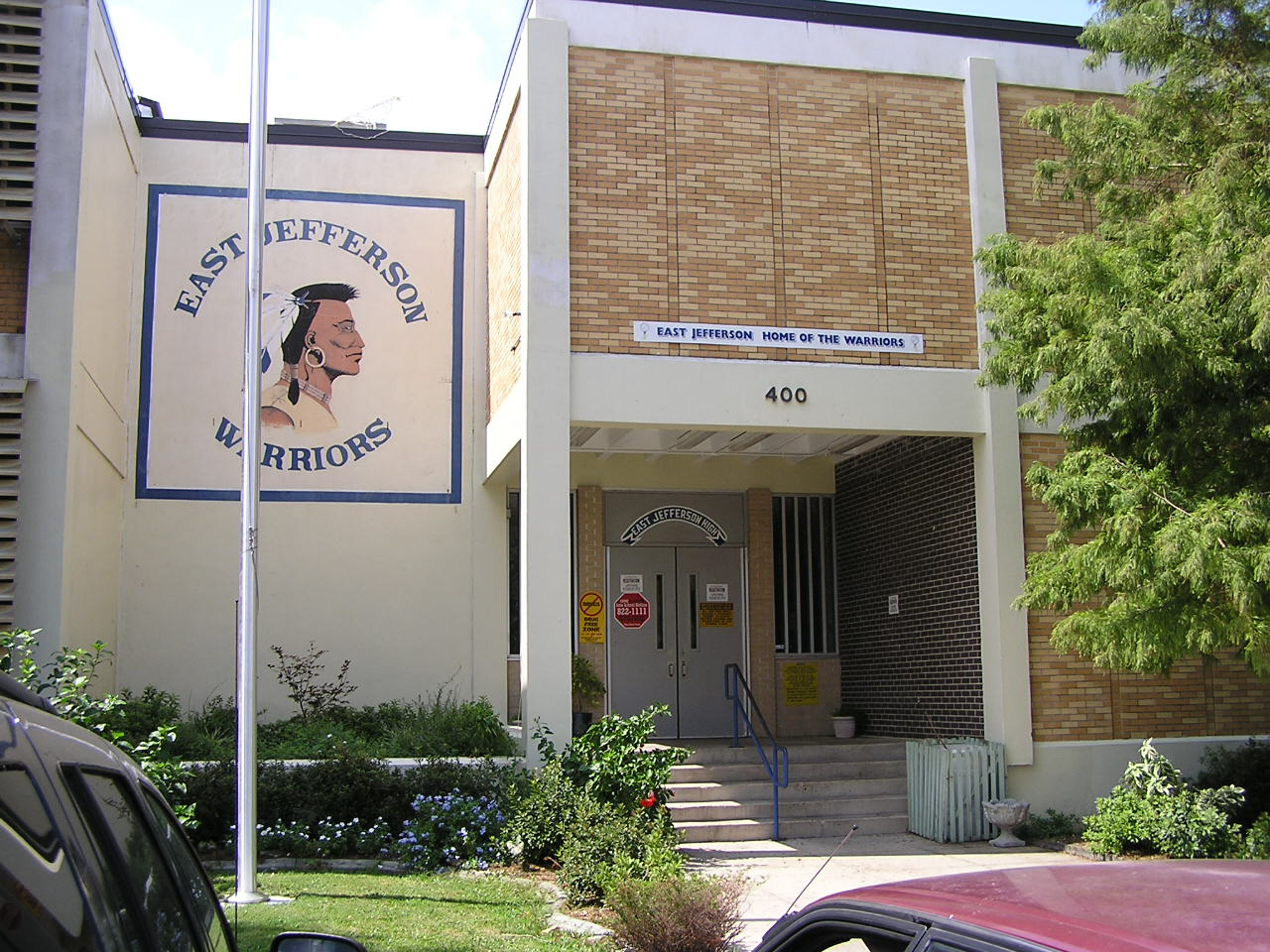

Location
- 400 Phlox Street; Metairie, Louisiana 70001-4557; United States; 29.9775°N 90.1814°W

Information
- Type: Public
- Established: 1955
- School district: Jefferson Parish Public Schools
- Principal: Ben Moscona
- Teaching staff: 65.86 (FTE)
- Grades: 9–12
- Enrollment: 1,499 (2023-2024)
- Student to teacher ratio: 22.76
- Colors: Blue and white
- Athletics conference: LHSAA 8-5A
- Mascot: Tecumseh
- Nickname: Warriors
- Website: eastjefferson.jpschools.org

East Jefferson High School is a public high school located in Metairie in unincorporated Jefferson Parish, Louisiana, United States. Its attendance boundary includes: portions of Metairie and Kenner. East Jefferson High School was built in 1955 in a residential neighborhood. The school serves grades 9–12. It is a part of the Jefferson Parish Public Schools system.

== History ==
Beginning in 1964, East Jefferson was a boys-only school for grades 10 to 11. The graduating class of 1963 was the last coed class for many years. In 1962, a new girls-only high school, Riverdale High School, was opened in Jefferson, LA shifting the 10th & 11th grade EJ girls. Starting in the 1963–64 school year girls-only Riverdale HS had 10th, 11th and 12th grades. By 1970, the East Jefferson attendance swelled to over 2000 boys and forced a two-shift "platoon" system to be implemented. Under the "A.M. & P.M." platoon shifts, the first classes went to school from 7 A.M. until noon, and the second shift went from 1 P.M. to 6 P.M. (the school cafeteria was converted to a library). In 1973, the school board began building a new all-male school near Kenner, called Alfred T. Bonnabel High, to split what was the largest school enrollment in a single K-12 institution the United States. Even though it would not be completed until two years later, the district decided to call the East Jefferson morning shift “Bonnabel” and the afternoon shift “East Jefferson”. The following year, the two shifts flip-flopped. For the third year, the students who had been using the name “Bonnabel” moved into their new buildings, just north of I-10 near Power Blvd. All Jefferson Parish high schools returned to co-ed status in the early 1980s.

== Athletics ==
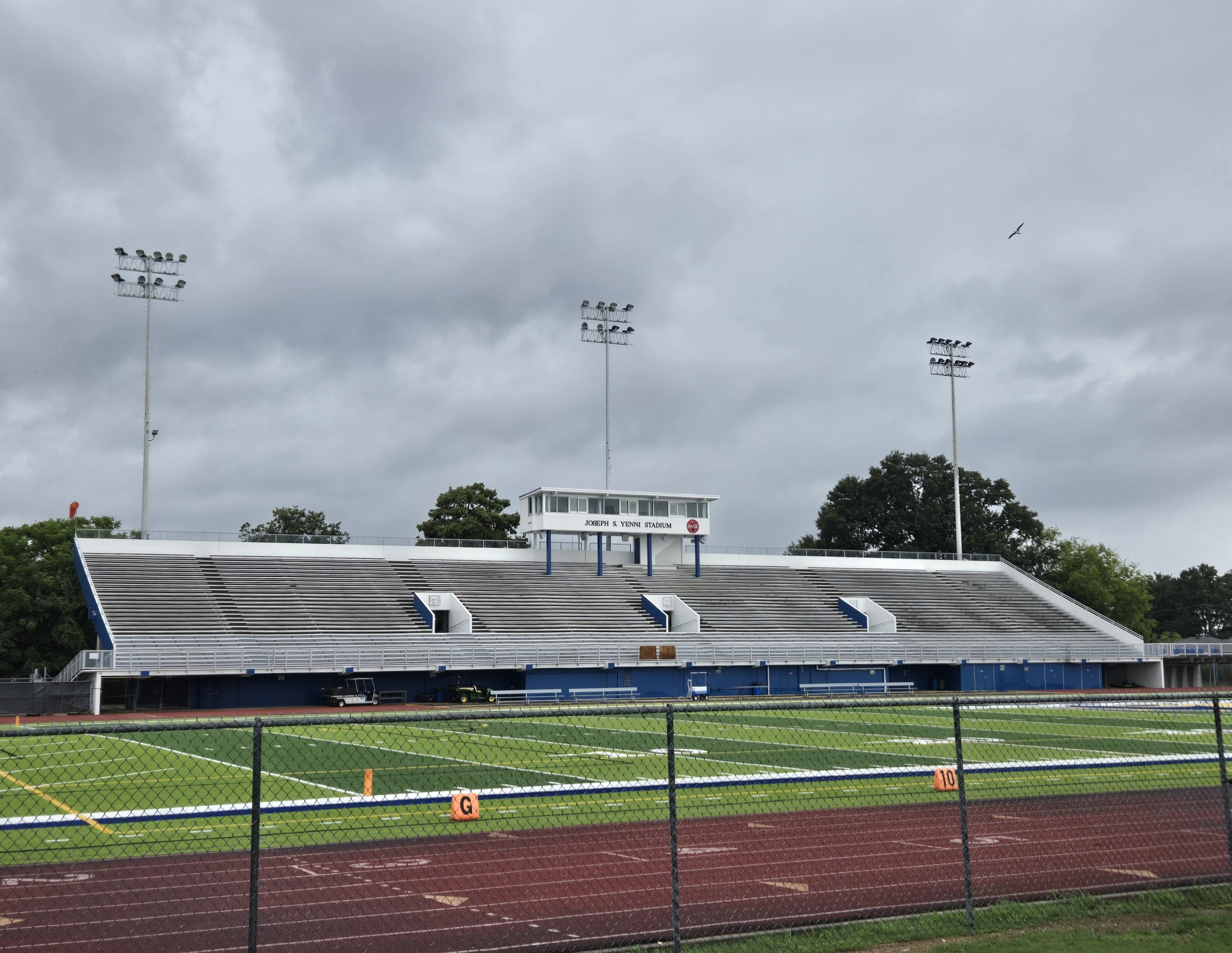
Joseph S. Yenni Stadium

East Jefferson High athletics competes in the LHSAA. Joseph S. Yenni Stadium is located on the campus.

=== Championships ===
Football championships

- (1) State Championship: 2013

On December 13, 2013, EJ's varsity football team finished the season 15–0 with a win against the Edna Karr Cougars, 38–28. This was EJ's first state title in school history and the first undefeated record in the regular season. They finished the season 10-0 then won their first playoff game since 1971. They then won the rest of the playoff games and finished the season with a bang by beating Edna Karr, finishing #23 in the nation.

Baseball championships

- (3) State Championship: 1971, 1972, 1978

In the 1970s, EJ's baseball team won three state titles, in 1971, 1972, and 1978. In 1971, EJ beat Broadmoor 8–1 to win the 4A title. EJ repeated as 4A state champs in 1972, defeating Neville 3–2. In 1978, EJ won another 4A title, beating West Monroe by a score of 3–1.

== Notable alumni ==
- Micah Blunt (class of 1978): basketball player who was the first Louisiana player to be selected to the McDonald's All-American Game Blunt was drafted in 1982 by the Los Angeles Lakers.
- Joe Brockhoff (class of 1956): head baseball coach at Tulane University from 1975 to 1993. Brockhoff also played baseball in the New York Yankees organization.
- Matthew Brunson: guitarist for the bands Crowbar and Kingdom of Sorrow
- John T. Curtis, Jr.: second-winningest head coach in high school football history at John Curtis Christian School
- Harlan Davis (class of 1986): Track & Field and American football standout. Set several Louisiana High school track records at the time. One still stands to this day that he set in 1985, he is the La State record holder for Class 4A 200m dash with a time of 21.09sec. Went on to compete in the 1988 Olympic trials in Indianapolis and reached the quarterfinal rd of the 200m. Also was a 1991 5th rd NFL draft selection by the Seattle Seahawks.
- Randy Hilliard (class of 1985): American football defensive back who played in the National Football League
- Bunny Matthews: music journalist and cartoonist, best known for his characters Vic and Nat'ly
- Mike Miley (class of 1971): athlete known for being a two-sport athlete playing quarterback and shortstop at LSU. Shortstop for the California Angels from 1975 to 1976, until his death in 1976 at the age of twenty-three. Airline Park Playground was renamed in his honor.
- Neil Reed (class of 1994): most recognized for his choking incident with coach Bob Knight while attending Indiana University. He was named Louisiana Player of the Year in 1994 and was a two-time state MVP.
- John Schroder (class of 1979): state representative from St. Tammany Parish
- Otis Smith: former NFL cornerback and defensive assistant coach for the New England Patriots of the National Football League
- Julie Skinner Stokes (class of 1988): State Representative from Jefferson Parish
- Glynn Sudbery (class of 1960): gay activist
- Dwight Walker (class of 1977): football running back for Nicholls State University. Drafted in the 4th round by the Cleveland Browns as a RB and WR from 1982 to 1984. Played for the New Orleans Saints as a WR in 1987.
- Marty Wetzel (class of 1977): football player for Tulane University then drafted in the 10th round by the New York Jets in 1981–1982
- Barry Raziano: major league pitcher with the Kansas City Royals and California Angels.
