= Neil Reed =

American basketball coach and former player (1975–2012)

Personal information
- Born: November 29, 1975 Hot Springs, Arkansas, U.S.
- Died: July 26, 2012 (aged 36) Santa Maria, California, U.S.
- Listed height: 6 ft 1 in (1.85 m)
- Listed weight: 190 lb (86 kg)

Career information
- High school: East Jefferson (Metairie, Louisiana)
- College: Indiana (1994–1997); Southern Miss (1998–1999)
- NBA draft: 1999: undrafted
- Position: Guard
- Number: 5

Career highlights
- McDonald's All-American (1994)

Burgess Neil Reed (November 29, 1975 – July 26, 2012) was an American college basketball player who played at Indiana University and the University of Southern Mississippi. He was noted for an incident during which he was choked by controversial Indiana coach Bob Knight in 1997.

== Biography ==
Reed played high school basketball at South Spencer High School in Reo, Indiana, as a freshman, Bloomington High School South in Bloomington, Indiana, as a sophomore, and East Jefferson High School in Jefferson Parish, Louisiana, as a junior and senior. Reed was named the Louisiana High School Boys Basketball Player of the Year in March 1994.

Reed played college basketball with the Indiana Hoosiers for three seasons, and after sitting out a year, one season with the Southern Miss Golden Eagles. Reed appeared in a total of 122 games, scoring 1,426 points (11.7 ppg). He led the Big Ten in free throw percentage for the 1996–97 season (.854), and led Conference USA in the same statistic for the 1998–99 season (.845). Indiana appeared in the NCAA tournament during each of Reed's three seasons there, losing in the first round in 1995, 1996, and 1997.

On March 14, 2000, the CNN Sports Illustrated network ran a piece in which former player Reed claimed that he had been choked by Indiana coach Bobby Knight during a 1997 practice. Knight denied the claims in the story. However, less than a month later, the network aired a tape of an Indiana practice from 1997 that appeared to show Knight choking Reed. Knight was later dismissed from Indiana, in September 2000.

Reed's life after basketball included work as an intern at ESPN The Magazine. In 2007, he joined Pioneer Valley High School in Santa Maria, California, as a physical education teacher, later coaching boys' basketball, boys' and girls' golf, and football.

Reed died at the age of 36 following a massive heart attack, at the Marian Regional Medical Center in Santa Maria, California, on July 26, 2012. Reed was married to Kelly with two children, Marley and Presley.
