= Kenny Young (American football) =

American football player (born 1995)

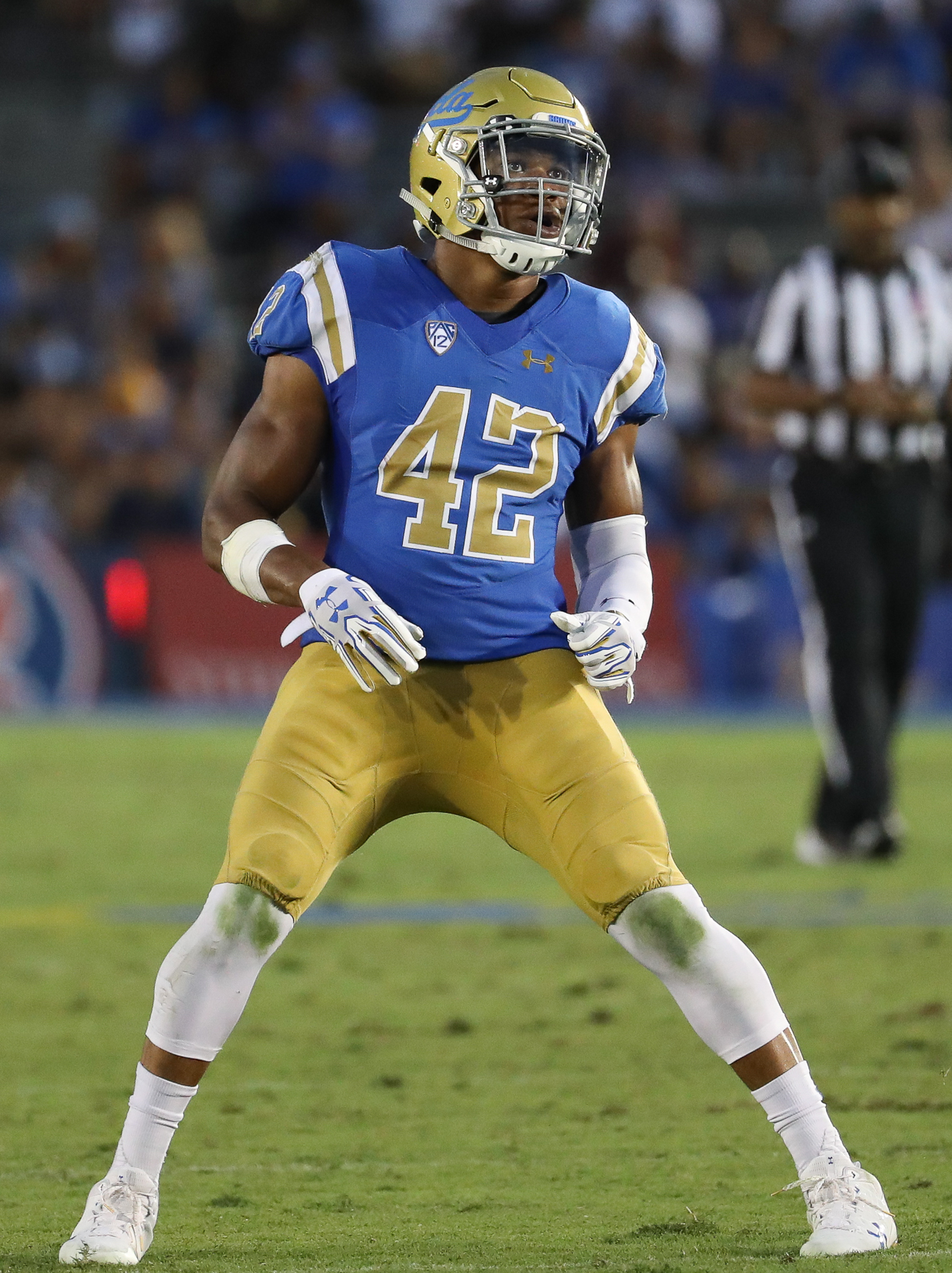
- Young with the UCLA Bruins in 2017

No. 40, 41, 33
- Position: Linebacker

Personal information
- Born: November 15, 1995 (age 30); New Orleans, Louisiana, U.S.
- Listed height: 6 ft 1 in (1.85 m)
- Listed weight: 234 lb (106 kg)

Career information
- High school: John Curtis Christian (River Ridge, Louisiana)
- College: UCLA (2014–2017)
- NFL draft: 2018: 4th round, 122nd overall pick

Career history
- Baltimore Ravens (2018–2019); Los Angeles Rams (2019–2021); Denver Broncos (2021); Las Vegas Raiders (2022)*; Tampa Bay Buccaneers (2022); New Orleans Saints (2022)*
- * Offseason or practice squad member only

Awards and highlights
- First-team All-Pac-12 (2017); Second-team All-Pac-12 (2016)

Career NFL statistics
- Total tackles: 196
- Sacks: 5.5
- Forced fumbles: 4
- Fumble recoveries: 3
- Pass deflections: 4
- Interceptions: 1
- Defensive touchdowns: 1
- Stats at Pro Football Reference

Kenneth Kim Young (born November 15, 1995) is an American former professional football player who was a linebacker in the National Football League (NFL). He played college football for the UCLA Bruins, and was selected by the Baltimore Ravens in the fourth round of the 2018 NFL draft. He played for the Los Angeles Rams, Denver Broncos, and Tampa Bay Buccaneers.

== Professional career ==
Pre-draft measurables
Height	Weight	Arm length	Hand span	40-yard dash	10-yard split	20-yard split	20-yard shuttle	Three-cone drill	Vertical jump	Broad jump	Bench press
6 ft 1 in (1.85 m)	236 lb (107 kg)	32 3/8 in (0.82 m)	9 1/2 in (0.24 m)	4.60 s	1.56 s	2.66 s	4.48 s	7.38 s	36.0 in (0.91 m)	9 ft 9 in (2.97 m)	23 reps
All values from NFL Combine

=== Baltimore Ravens ===
Young attended the University of California, Los Angeles, where he played college football there for the Bruins. He was eventually selected by the Baltimore Ravens in the fourth round with the 122nd overall pick in the 2018 NFL draft. In his first NFL start in the Ravens' season opener against the Buffalo Bills, Young recorded his first career sack to go along with four total tackles. He finished his rookie season with 51 combined tackles, 2.5 sacks, and a forced fumble.

=== Los Angeles Rams ===
On October 15, 2019, Young was traded to the Los Angeles Rams, along with a 5th round draft pick, in exchange for cornerback Marcus Peters.

In Week 14 of the 2020 season against the New England Patriots, Young led the team with eight tackles, sacked Cam Newton once, and intercepted a pass thrown by Newton that he returned for a 79-yard touchdown during the 24–3 win. This was Young's first career touchdown.

=== Denver Broncos ===
On October 25, 2021, Young was traded to the Denver Broncos for a 2024 sixth-round pick.

=== Las Vegas Raiders ===
On May 9, 2022, Young was signed by the Las Vegas Raiders. He was released on August 18.

=== Tampa Bay Buccaneers ===
On September 5, 2022, Young was signed to the practice squad of the Tampa Bay Buccaneers. He was promoted to the active roster on September 21, 2022. He was released on October 10.

=== New Orleans Saints ===
On November 10, 2022, Young was signed to the New Orleans Saints practice squad. He was later released by the team.
