= Randy Hilliard =

American football player (born 1967)

No. 21, 39, 47
- Position: Cornerback

Personal information
- Born: February 6, 1967 (age 59); New Orleans, Louisiana, U.S.
- Listed height: 5 ft 11 in (1.80 m)
- Listed weight: 165 lb (75 kg)

Career information
- High school: East Jefferson (Metairie, Louisiana)
- College: Northwestern State (LA)
- NFL draft: 1990: 6th round, 157th overall pick

Career history
- Cleveland Browns (1990–1993); Denver Broncos (1994–1997); Chicago Bears (1998)

Awards and highlights
- Super Bowl champion (XXXII)

Career NFL statistics
- Tackles: 236
- Interceptions: 5
- Fumble recoveries: 3
- Stats at Pro Football Reference

Randy Hilliard (born February 6, 1967) is an American former professional football player who was a defensive back in the National Football League (NFL). He played college football for the Northwestern State Demons and was selected by the Cleveland Browns in the sixth round of the 1990 NFL draft. He played for the Browns from 1990 to 1993, for the Denver Broncos from 1994 to 1997, and for the Chicago Bears in 1998. In 1998, Hilliard was a part of the Denver Broncos' Super Bowl XXXII winning team.
