= Mike Miley =

American baseball player (1953–1977)

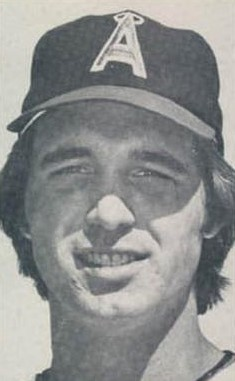
- Shortstop
- Born: March 30, 1953; Yazoo City, Mississippi, U.S.
- Died: January 6, 1977 (aged 23); Baton Rouge, Louisiana, U.S.
- Batted: Switch Threw: Right

MLB debut
- July 6, 1975, for the California Angels

Last MLB appearance
- October 3, 1976, for the California Angels

MLB statistics
- Batting average: .176
- Home runs: 4
- Runs batted in: 30
- Stats at Baseball Reference

Teams
- California Angels (1975–1976)

Michael Wilfred Miley (March 30, 1953 – January 6, 1977) was an American professional baseball player who played two seasons for the California Angels of Major League Baseball (MLB). He died in a one-car crash in Baton Rouge, Louisiana.

Miley attended East Jefferson High School in Metairie, Louisiana and played football at Louisiana State University. His exploits and leadership as quarterback for the Tigers earned him the nickname, "Miracle Mike".

Miley quarterbacked LSU into the 1974 Orange Bowl as a junior, but left school to sign with the Angels later that year. He was California's No. 1 draft pick in 1974 and played in 70 games in 1975 and 14 in 1976.

== See also ==
- List of baseball players who died during their careers
