= Duke Riley (American football) =

American football player (born 1994)

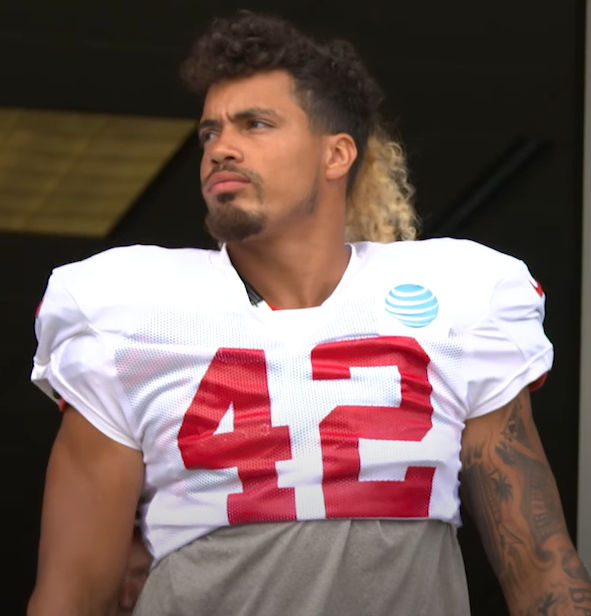
- Riley with the Atlanta Falcons in 2017

Profile
- Position: Linebacker

Personal information
- Born: August 9, 1994 (age 32); Buras, Louisiana, U.S.
- Listed height: 6 ft 0 in (1.83 m)
- Listed weight: 218 lb (99 kg)

Career information
- High school: John Curtis Christian (River Ridge, Louisiana)
- College: LSU (2013–2016)
- NFL draft: 2017: 3rd round, 75th overall pick

Career history
- Atlanta Falcons (2017–2019); Philadelphia Eagles (2019–2020); Miami Dolphins (2021–2024); Washington Commanders (2025)*
- * Offseason or practice squad member only

Career NFL statistics as of 2024
- Tackles: 283
- Sacks: 2
- Forced fumbles: 2
- Fumble recoveries: 1
- Interceptions: 1
- Pass deflections: 6
- Stats at Pro Football Reference

Duke Riley (born August 9, 1994) is an American professional football linebacker. He played college football for the LSU Tigers and was selected by the Atlanta Falcons in the third round of the 2017 NFL draft. Riley has also played for the Philadelphia Eagles, Miami Dolphins, and Washington Commanders.

== Early life ==
Riley attended John Curtis Christian High School in River Ridge, Louisiana. He committed to Louisiana State University (LSU) to play college football.

== College career ==
Riley played at LSU from 2013 to 2016. After spending his first three seasons as a backup, he became a starter for the first time his senior year in 2016. That season, he had 93 tackles, 1.5 sacks, and one interception and was named the team's MVP.

== Professional career ==
On November 16, 2016, it was reported that Riley had accepted an invitation to play in the Reese's Senior Bowl, joining LSU teammates Tre'Davious White, Ethan Pocic, Travin Dural, and Kendell Beckwith. On January 2, 2017, it was announced by Lil' Wayne on Instagram that Riley had signed with his company Young Money APAA Sports, and had successfully merged with his Young Money Entertainment record label. He became the company's first client they represented. He had an impressive week of practices at the Senior Bowl under Cleveland Browns head coach Hue Jackson, showing athleticism, quick instincts, and range. On January 28, 2017, Riley recorded a team-high seven combined tackles (four solo), helping the South defeat the North 16–15. His overall performance was spectacular during the 2017 Senior Bowl and was thought to immensely improve his draft stock. He received an invitation to the NFL Combine and completed nearly all of the required drills, but opted to skip the short shuttle and three-cone drill. On April 5, 2017, Riley participated at LSU's pro day, but opted to stand on his combine numbers and only perform positional drills. Over 125 team representatives and scouts attended, including head coaches Sean Payton (New Orleans Saints), Mike Tomlin (Pittsburgh Steelers), Mike Mularkey (Tennessee Titans), Todd Bowles (New York Jets), and Jim Caldwell (Detroit Lions). Riley opted to run the 40-yard dash (4.64), 20-yard dash (2.67), and 10-yard dash again while also performing positional drills. At the conclusion of the pre-draft process, Riley was projected to be a second to fourth round pick by the majority of NFL draft experts and scouts. He was ranked the seventh best outside linebacker by NFLDraftScout.com.

Pre-draft measurables
Height	Weight	Arm length	Hand span	40-yard dash	10-yard split	20-yard split	20-yard shuttle	Three-cone drill	Vertical jump	Broad jump	Bench press
6 ft 0 1/2 in (1.84 m)	232 lb (105 kg)	32 in (0.81 m)	9 1/4 in (0.23 m)	4.58 s	1.56 s	2.65 s	4.21 s	6.89 s	34 1/2 in (0.88 m)	10 ft 2 in (3.10 m)	18 reps
All values from NFL Combine

=== Atlanta Falcons ===
==== 2017 ====
The Atlanta Falcons selected Riley in the third round (75th overall) of the 2017 NFL draft. He was reunited with former LSU teammate Deion Jones who Riley looked at as a role model as an elite linebacker at LSU. Riley also wore number 0 at the Senior Bowl to hopefully begin a tradition that began with Jones when he was the first player to wear the number 0 in a Senior Bowl.

External videos
- Falcons draft Duke Riley 75th overall

On May 11, 2017, the Falcons signed Riley to a four-year, $3.51 million contract that includes a signing bonus of $889,752.

Throughout training camp, Riley competed with De'Vondre Campbell, Josh Keyes, J'Terius Jones, and Jermaine Grace for the starting weakside linebacker position. Head coach Dan Quinn named him the backup weakside linebacker to veteran De'Vondre Campbell to begin the season.

He earned his first start in the Falcons' season-opener against the Chicago Bears and made six combined tackles in the 24–17 victory. Riley earned his first career start at weakside linebacker with De'Vondre Campbell starting at the strongside linebacker position over Vic Beasley. Duke Riley, De'Vondre Campbell, and Deion Jones were the starting linebacker corp in the Atlanta Falcons' big base package. Unfortunately, Riley missed four tackles during the game, but played 49 out of 67 defensive snaps. On October 22, 2017, Riley recorded a solo tackle in a 23–7 loss to the New England Patriots, but left the game after tearing his meniscus. He underwent successful surgery to repair the tear and missed the next four games (Weeks 8 to 11). He finished his rookie season in 2017 with 30 combined tackles (15 solo) in 12 games and six starts.

The Atlanta Falcons finished third in the NFC South with a 10–6 record and earned a wildcard berth. On January 6, 2018, Riley appeared in his first career playoff game and made two combined tackles during a 26–13 victory at the Los Angeles Rams in the NFC Wild Card Round. The following week, he made one tackle as the Falcons lost 15–10 in the NFC Divisional Round to the Philadelphia Eagles.

==== 2018 ====
Riley had a disappointing 2018 campaign, and saw his role diminish throughout the season. Initially Riley entered training camp slated as the starting weakside linebacker, but saw minor competition for the role from Foyesade Oluokun, who ended up surpassing Riley on the depth chart. Head coach Dan Quinn named Riley the starting weakside linebacker to begin the regular season. He started the season alongside De’Vondre Campbell and middle linebacker Deion Jones. In Week 3, he collected a season-high 13 combined tackles (nine solo) during a 43-37 loss against the Saints. Riley began seeing a decreased snap count during the season and eventually lost his starting role to Foyesade Oluokun in Week 13 and remained a backup for the remainder of the season. He finished the season with 60 combined tackles (37 solo) and two pass deflections in 16 games and ten starts. He received an overall grade of 44.2 from Pro Football Focus, which ranked 87th among all qualifying linebackers in 2018.

=== Philadelphia Eagles ===
On September 30, 2019, Riley was traded to the Eagles for safety Johnathan Cyprien and a swap of late-round picks. On January 2, 2020, Riley was named special teams captain for the Eagles Wild card match up with Seattle.

In Week 5 of the 2020 season against the Steelers, Riley led the team with 13 tackles (7 solo) and injured himself when forcing a fumble on tight end Eric Ebron and he had to be carted off the field. Without Riley, the Eagles lost 38–29. In Week 14 against the Saints, Riley recorded his first interception off a pass thrown by Taysom Hill during the 24–21 win. He was placed on injured reserve on January 1, 2021. He finished the season with 55 tackles, one forced fumble and one interception through 13 games and eight starts.

=== Miami Dolphins ===
Riley signed with the Miami Dolphins on March 22, 2021. He played in 16 games with three starts, recording 26 tackles primarily on special teams and a rotational linebacker.

On March 15, 2022, Riley signed a one-year contract extension with the Dolphins. He played in 17 games with two starts, recording 45 tackles, one sack and two passes defensed.

On March 16, 2023, Riley signed a two-year contract extension with Dolphins.

=== Washington Commanders ===
Riley signed with the Washington Commanders on August 11, 2025, and was released on August 26.
