= Joe McKnight =

American gridiron football player (1988–2016)

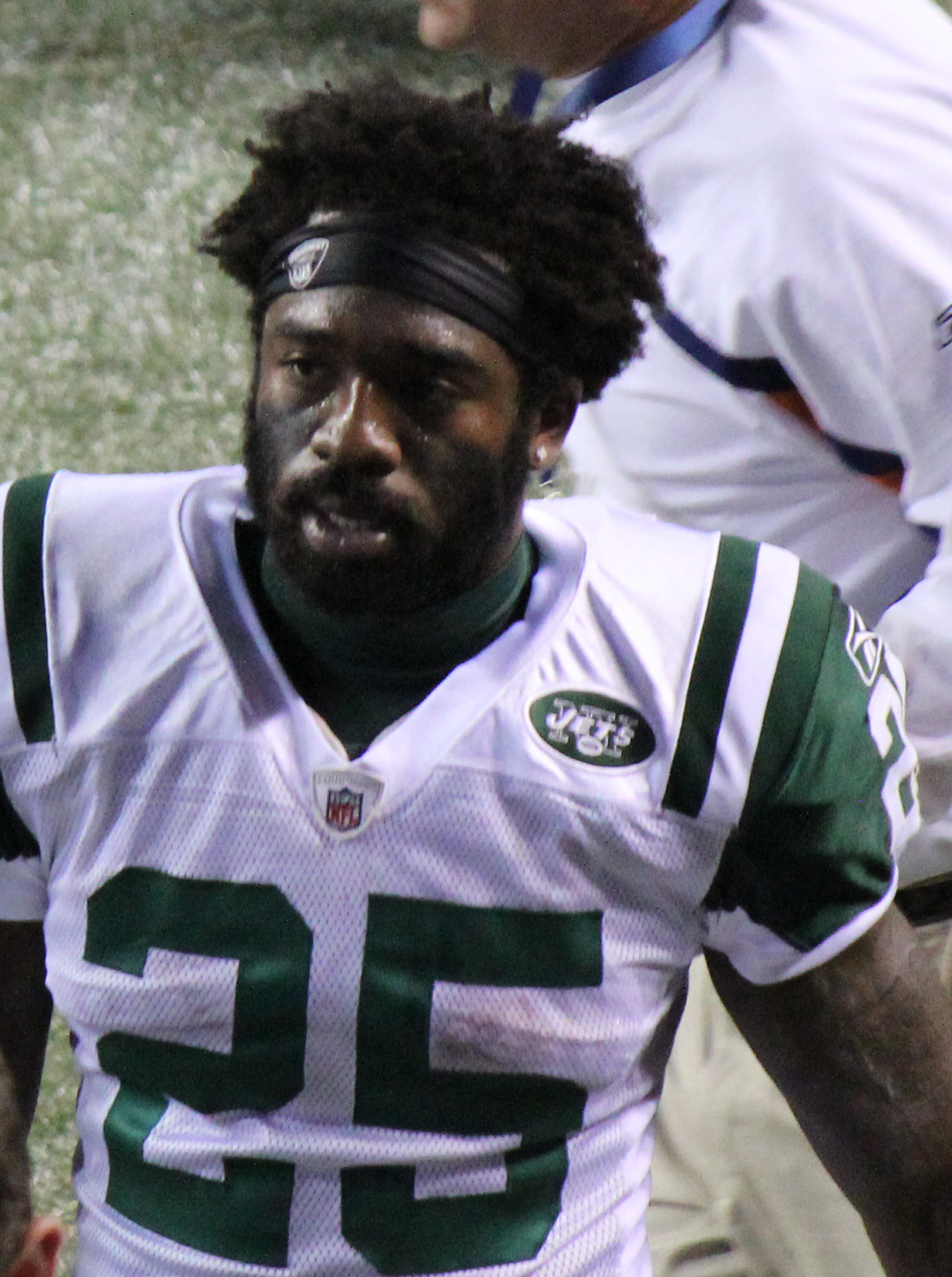
- McKnight with the New York Jets in 2011

No. 25, 30, 22, 33
- Position: Running back

Personal information
- Born: April 16, 1988; Kenner, Louisiana, U.S.
- Died: December 1, 2016 (aged 28); Terrytown, Louisiana, U.S.
- Listed height: 5 ft 11 in (1.80 m)
- Listed weight: 205 lb (93 kg)

Career information
- High school: John Curtis Christian (River Ridge, Louisiana)
- College: USC (2007–2009)
- NFL draft: 2010: 4th round, 112th overall pick

Career history
- New York Jets (2010–2012); Kansas City Chiefs (2014); Edmonton Eskimos (2016); Saskatchewan Roughriders (2016)

Career NFL statistics
- Rushing attempts: 113
- Rushing yards: 505
- Receptions: 23
- Receiving yards: 241
- Return yards: 2,339
- Total touchdowns: 4
- Stats at Pro Football Reference

Joseph Nathan McKnight Jr. (April 16, 1988 – December 1, 2016) was an American professional football player who was a running back and return specialist in the National Football League (NFL) and Canadian Football League (CFL).

He attended the University of Southern California (USC), where he played college football for the USC Trojans. McKnight was selected in the fourth round of the 2010 NFL draft by the New York Jets. After playing in the NFL for the Jets and Kansas City Chiefs, he played in the CFL for the Edmonton Eskimos and the Saskatchewan Roughriders.

On December 1, 2016, McKnight was killed in an apparent road rage incident.

== Early life ==
McKnight attended John Curtis Christian High School in River Ridge, Louisiana. For his first years of high school, McKnight played defense as a cornerback; his high school career was complicated by the aftermath of Hurricane Katrina, which devastated his part of Louisiana just before his junior season of 2005. Separated from his mother, who had evacuated to Baton Rouge, McKnight temporarily relocated to Shreveport where he eventually enrolled and played two games for Evangel Christian Academy. His family was able to relocate back to River Ridge, but their home had been destroyed so they moved into a one-bedroom apartment.

For the rest of the shortened 2005 season, McKnight scored 22 touchdowns (nine rushing, five receiving, four punt returns, three interceptions, one kickoff return) and averaged 18 yards a play in leading his team to the state championship. In 2006, McKnight rushed for 719 yards on 45 carries, scoring 14 touchdowns, had 24 catches for 735 yards and 13 touchdowns, and with special teams play scored a total of 30 touchdowns as a senior; he was instrumental in John Curtis Christian's 14–0 season, often used as a decoy player due to his scoring threat.

McKnight was the latest of a line of running back prospects out of John Curtis Christian HS – among them Reggie Dupard, Chris Howard and Jonathan Wells. Most recruiting analysts ranked him as one of the top two of the 2007 high school class (next to quarterback Jimmy Clausen of Oaks Christian High School). Considered a five-star recruit, on January 28, 2007, McKnight was named co-Player of the Year by Parade, sharing the honor with Clausen. Rivals.com ranked McKnight the best running back prospect in the U.S., and the second best recruit overall.

USC assigned linebackers coach and former NFL All-Pro Ken Norton Jr. to handle the recruitment of McKnight. Louisiana State University (LSU) coach Les Miles visited McKnight on February 1, 2007, the last possible date before National Signing Day, in order to ensure McKnight's commitment to LSU. However, on February 7 McKnight committed to USC. At USC, McKnight was joined by second-ranked running back prospect Marc Tyler. The backlash against McKnight's decision to attend college out of state manifested itself when the Curtis School's marching band was booed performing at a Mardi Gras parade.

McKnight stated that his interest in USC came from its football tradition, notably their Heisman Trophies, and his interest in sports broadcasting, noting the USC Annenberg School for Communication. He is the highest rated football player ever recruited by the University of Southern California.

=== Recruiting controversy ===
McKnight told reporters on National Signing Day that he spoke to former USC running back Reggie Bush before he chose Southern California over favored LSU. On February 9, the Los Angeles Times reported that USC officials were investigating whether an NCAA recruiting violation occurred during the Trojans' pursuit of the Louisiana prep star. At issue was whether McKnight listened to a phone call between head coach Pete Carroll and Bush. NCAA rules state that alumni cannot speak to players and attempt to persuade them to join their former school.

McKnight and his high school coach, J.T. Curtis, both later claimed that McKnight misspoke during the news conference and that McKnight had never actually met or spoken to Bush. Bush and Carroll denied that a conference call ever took place. Carroll blamed the controversy surrounding McKnight on LSU fans who were unhappy that McKnight chose to leave the state of Louisiana and attend USC.

College recruiting
Name	Hometown	School	Height	Weight	40^{‡}	Commit date
Joe McKnight; Running back	River Ridge, Louisiana	John Curtis Christian High School	5 ft 11 in (1.80 m)	193 lb (88 kg)	4.4	Jan 19, 2007
Joe McKnight; Running back	Recruit ratings: Scout: Rivals:					
Overall recruit ranking: Scout: 1 (RB, S) Rivals: 2, 1 (RB), 1 (LS)
‡ Refers to 40-yard dash; Note: In many cases, Scout, Rivals, 247Sports, On3, and ESPN may conflict in their listings of height, weight and 40 time.; In these cases, the average was taken. ESPN grades are on a 100-point scale.; Sources: "2007 USC Football Commitment List". Rivals.; "2007 USC Football Recruiting Commits". Scout.; "Scout.com Team Recruiting Rankings". Scout.; "2007 Team Ranking". Rivals.com.

== College career ==
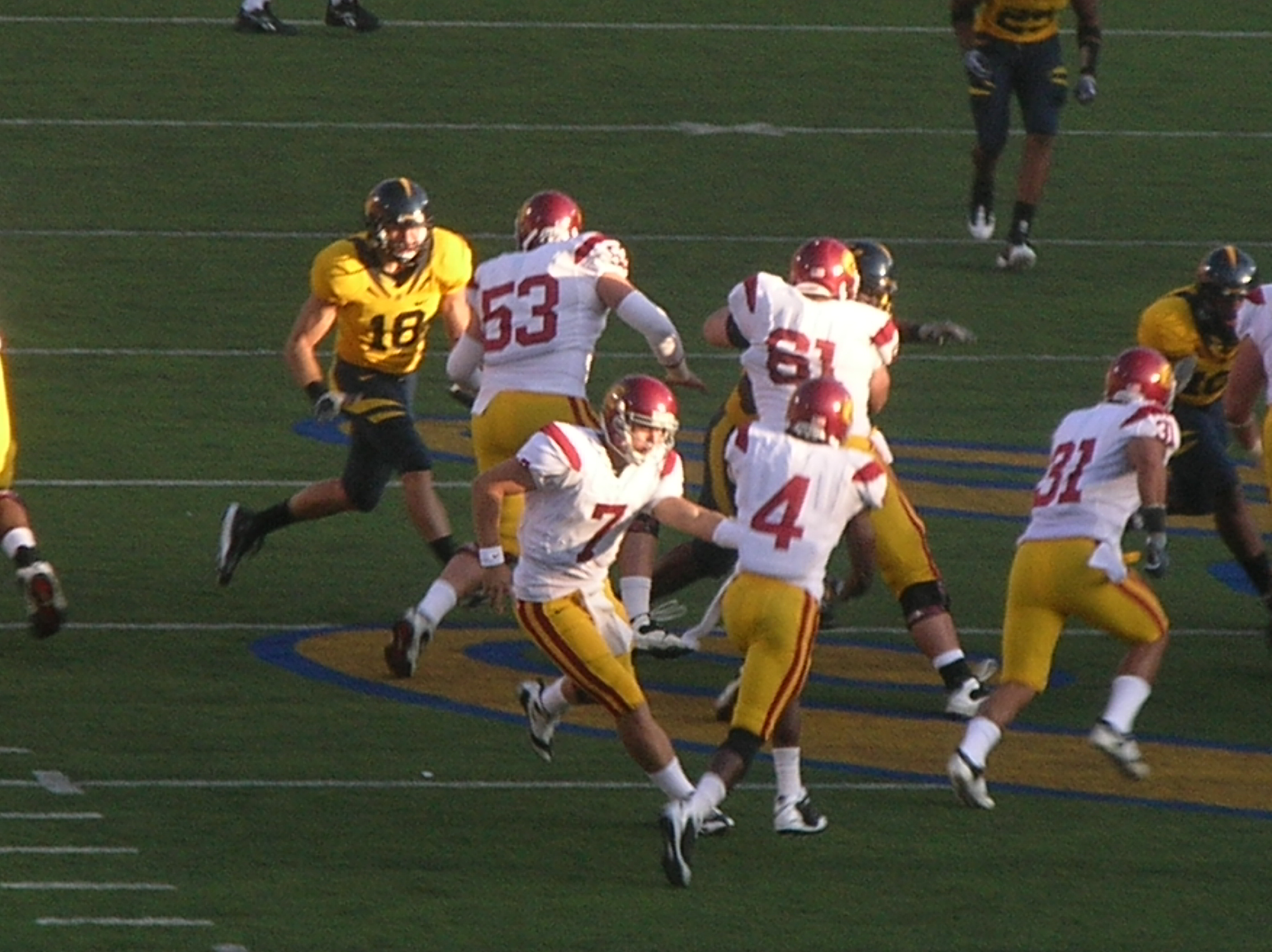
McKnight (no. 4) takes the handoff from Matt Barkley during an October 2009 matchup against California.

Because of his talent and versatility, the media and opposing coaches called McKnight the "next Reggie Bush". McKnight began college at the University of Southern California in June 2007. He was awarded with the inaugural Frank Gifford Endowed Football Scholarship, which is given out annually by the USC athletic department to an incoming freshman running back, quarterback or wide receiver who best emulates Gifford's life, success and spirit. By the pre-season practice before his freshman season at USC, McKnight had already demonstrated some of the speed and moves that made him an impact player in high school.

After a slow start during his freshman season, dealing with fumble issues for the first time in his career, he made a pivotal contribution in a victory against Arizona, where he ran a punt return for 45 yards, and later ran for 59 yards to set USC up for their last 10 points in their game.

McKnight achieved a break-through at the end of his freshman season during the 2008 Rose Bowl, where he had 206 all-purpose yards: 36 on three punt returns, 45 on six pass receptions and 125 in 10 carries with one touchdown.

During his freshman season, McKnight painted "I need $" under his eye blacks to signify his desire to play professional football in the NFL.

Before his sophomore season, McKnight was included in Sports Illustrated's spring list of top ten Heisman Trophy contenders going into the fall. However, his sophomore season was hampered early on by medical conditions, fumbles and injuries, including a nagging metatarsalphalangeal joint sprain that prevented him from playing in two games. In February 2009, Bobby Burton of Rivals.com summed up his career by writing, "McKnight really hasn't lived up to the hype. He's good, but he just hasn't broken out to show he's the best back in his class".

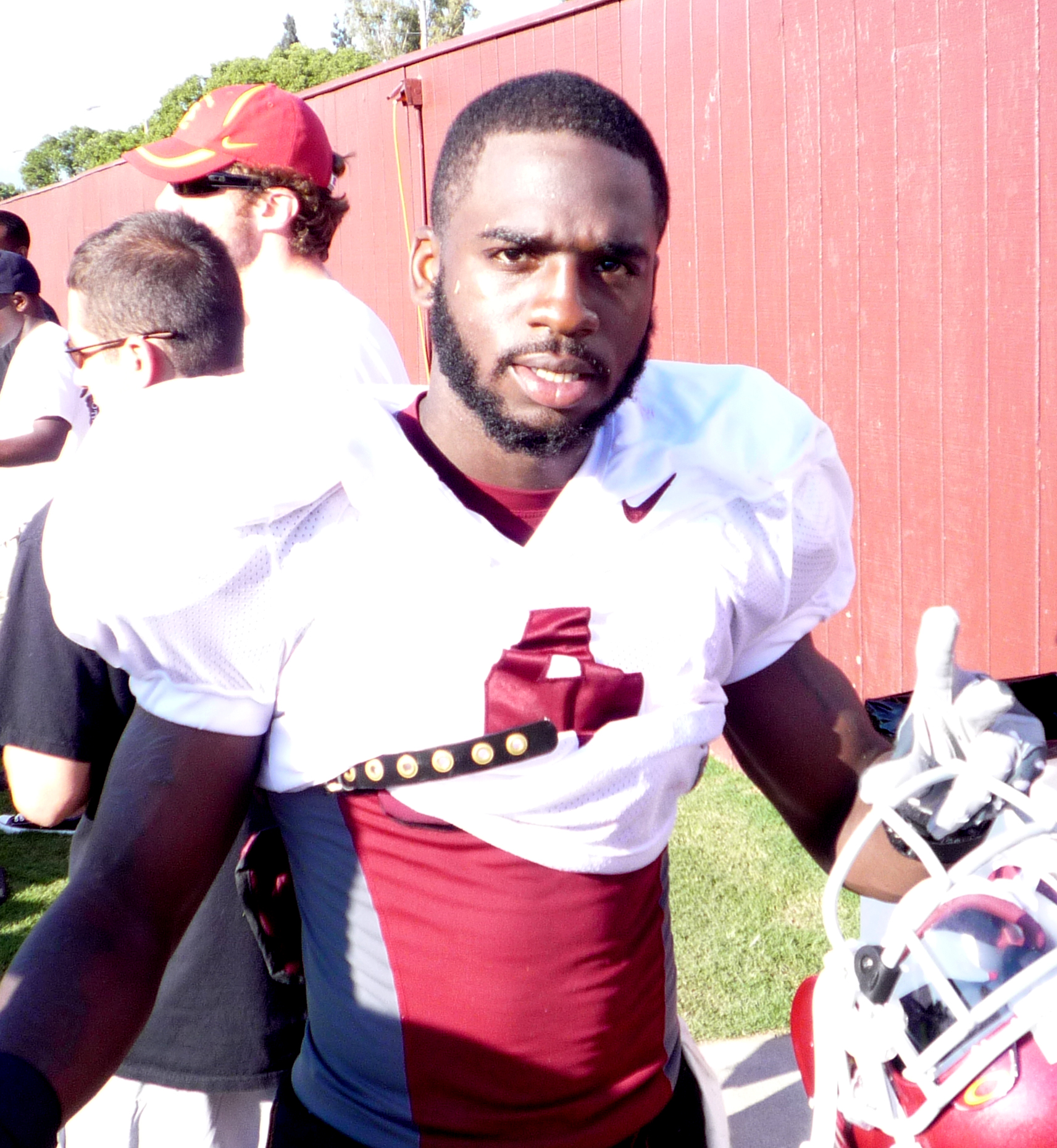
McKnight after a fall practice in August 2008 during his tenure at USC.

In his junior and final college football season, it was reported that McKnight was granted free use of a 2006 Land Rover SUV registered to Santa Monica businessman Scott Schenter, in violation of NCAA rules. Schenter responded, claiming that the SUV actually belonged to McKnight's girlfriend, Johana Michelle Beltran, although McKnight had reportedly been seen driving it around town. As a result of the pending investigation, the USC compliance department did not clear McKnight to play in the 2009 Emerald Bowl.

On January 8, 2010, McKnight declared his intention to forgo his final year of eligibility, hired an agent and entered the 2010 NFL draft.

== Professional career ==
Pre-draft measurables
Height	Weight	Arm length	Hand span	40-yard dash	10-yard split	20-yard split	20-yard shuttle	Three-cone drill	Vertical jump	Broad jump	Bench press
5 ft 11 3/8 in (1.81 m)	198 lb (90 kg)	31 3/4 in (0.81 m)	9 1/8 in (0.23 m)	4.47 s	1.57 s	2.65 s	4.48 s	7.12 s	36.5 in (0.93 m)	10 ft 0 in (3.05 m)	18 reps
All values from NFL Combine/Pro Day

=== New York Jets ===
==== 2010 ====
McKnight was selected by the New York Jets in the fourth round (112th overall) of the 2010 NFL draft. To select McKnight, the Jets traded up twelve spots in the fourth round with the Carolina Panthers. In return, the Jets sent their fourth (124th overall) and sixth (198th overall) round selections to Carolina. McKnight formally signed with the Jets on June 22, 2010.

McKnight struggled in the early stages of his professional career, vomiting during the Jets' rookie minicamp in May 2010. McKnight later admitted he had not been in proper condition at the time. He continued to struggle into the preseason, fumbling the football three times. Though he was not in danger of being released from the team, it was maintained that McKnight would not appear on the active roster until the coaches felt more confident in his abilities. McKnight made his NFL debut on October 3, 2010, against the Buffalo Bills and was used in a limited capacity on offense before being utilized as an emergency cornerback and on special teams over the course of the season. In McKnight's first game as the starting running back, against the Bills during the Jets' final regular season contest, McKnight ran for 158 yards on 32 carries with no fumbles and caught two passes for 15 yards.

==== 2011 ====
During the Jets' 2011 home opener against the Dallas Cowboys on September 11, 2011, McKnight blocked Matt McBriar's punt on a critical play resulting in a touchdown by fellow defender Isaiah Trufant. The Jets went on to defeat the Cowboys 27–24. During the Jets' Sunday night game against the Baltimore Ravens, on October 2, 2011, McKnight returned a kickoff for 107 yards, his first career touchdown. It was the longest play in Jets history. On January 16, 2012, McKnight was named as the Kick Returner for All-Pro team By Pro Football Weekly / Pro Football Writers Association.

==== 2012 ====
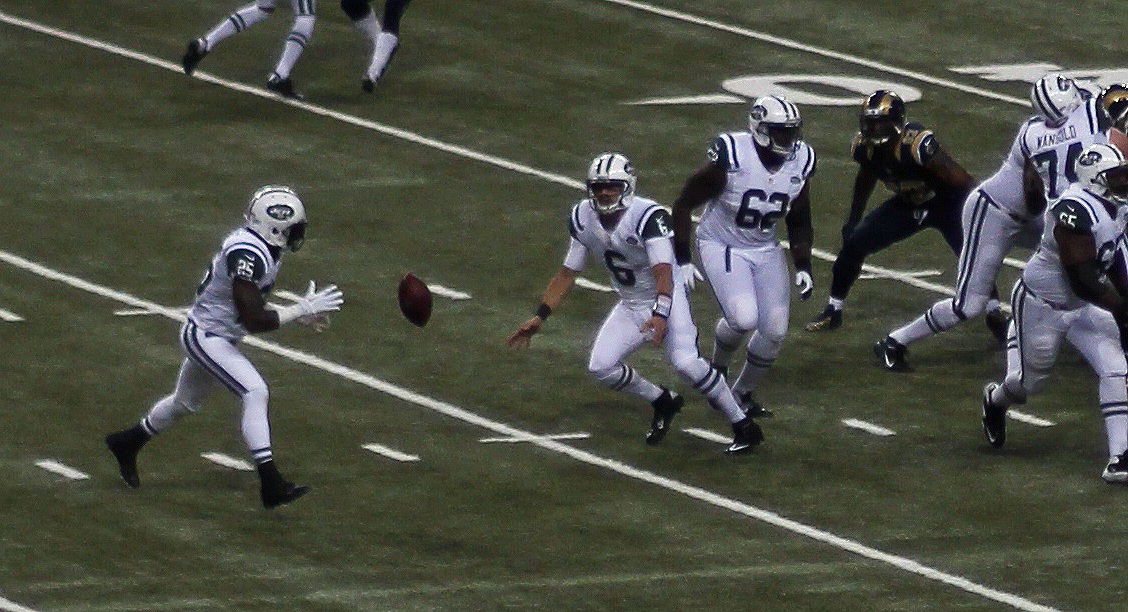
McKnight takes a pitch play from Jets quarterback Mark Sanchez in 2012.

On September 26, 2012, Jets head coach Rex Ryan announced that McKnight would see an increase in defensive snaps at cornerback. The announcement was prompted after Darrelle Revis suffered a season-ending ACL tear. Shortly after the announcement was made, McKnight was switched back to his former role as a running back. On October 8, 2012, McKnight returned a 100-yard kickoff for a touchdown against the Houston Texans, recording his second career touchdown. Elias Sports Bureau reported that McKnight had extended the Jets' NFL record of most consecutive years with a kickoff return for a touchdown to 11 years.

He was released by the Jets on August 26, 2013.

=== Kansas City Chiefs ===
After spending the entire 2013 year out of football, McKnight signed with the Kansas City Chiefs on January 12, 2014. On July 21, McKnight was placed on the Physically Unable to Perform list. On September 21, 2014, in a game against the Miami Dolphins, he scored two times on receptions from Alex Smith. McKnight suffered a torn Achilles tendon during practice on September 26, 2014, and was ruled out for the rest of the 2014 season.

=== Canadian Football League ===
On February 19, 2016, McKnight signed with the Edmonton Eskimos of the Canadian Football League (CFL). but was released on August 10, 2016. The Saskatchewan Roughriders acquired McKnight on September 20, 2016. On October 15, 2016, making his first career CFL start, McKnight rushed for 150 yards on 17 carries. He also had one reception for 3 yards. McKnight appeared in three games for the Roughriders in 2016, running for 228 yards in 38 attempts and catching 11 passes. McKnight was under contract to the Saskatchewan Roughriders for the 2017 season.

== Death ==
On December 1, 2016, McKnight was fatally shot by 54-year-old Ronald Gasser at an intersection in Terrytown, Louisiana, in what was described as a road rage shooting.

McKnight exited his vehicle and approached Gasser's car when he was shot by Gasser who was still in his own vehicle. An initial media report based on an alleged eyewitness claimed that after firing the initial shot, Gasser stood over McKnight and said, "I told you not to fuck with me," after which, he fired another shot. However, this scenario was disputed by Jefferson Parish Sheriff's Office, which stated that forensic evidence suggested Gasser fired the shots in quick succession from within his car. Gasser remained at the scene and turned in his gun to police.

The Jefferson Parish Sheriff's Office took Gasser into custody for questioning, and released him without pressing charges while the investigation continued. Gasser was arrested for manslaughter on December 5, 2016, but was indicted by a grand jury on the more severe charge of second degree murder on February 2, 2017. On January 26, 2018, Gasser was acquitted of murder, but found guilty of manslaughter by a 10–2 verdict, and was sentenced to 30 years in prison two months later on March 15.

The conviction (by a 10–2 verdict) and sentence, however, were set aside as a result of the Ramos v. Louisiana ruling by the United States Supreme Court, which declared that non-unanimous criminal convictions violate the Sixth and Fourteenth Amendments. Because the decision was made retroactive, all defendants who had not exhausted appeals had their convictions set aside for new trials, and Gasser was granted a new trial shortly after the Ramos decision (a separate case, Edwards v. Vannoy, will address the issue for those who had already exhausted appeals). However, because of double jeopardy, Gasser can only face manslaughter and not murder charges on retrial. After this, Gasser remained in prison awaiting his retrial. In December 2022, Gasser accepted a plea-deal, and was sentenced to ten years in prison.

== See also ==
- List of gridiron football players who died during their careers

== Awards and honors ==
- McKnight was named Pac-10 Offensive Player of the Week on September 14, 2009, for his role in a win against Ohio State.
- The Times-Picayune named McKnight its "Male High School Athlete of the Decade".
- Longest play in New York Jets history (107-yard kickoff return for a touchdown vs. Baltimore Ravens) on October 2, 2011.
