= John Curtis Christian School =

Private school in River Ridge, Louisiana, United States

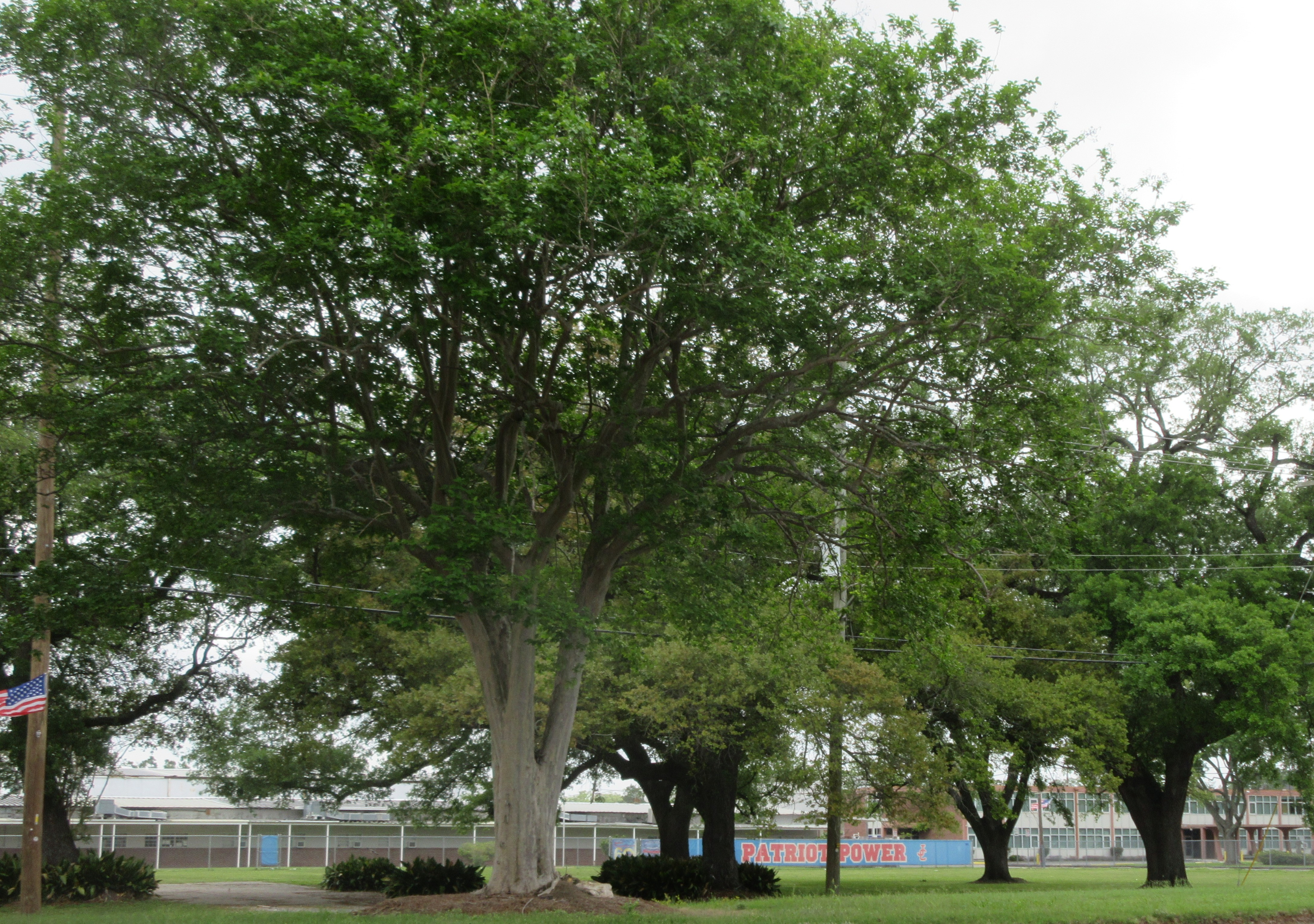
- John Curtis Christian High School

Location
- 10125 Jefferson Highway; River Ridge, Jefferson Parish, LA; United States; 29.9636145°N 90.2237939°W

Information
- School type: Private Christian co-educational
- Established: 1962; 64 years ago
- Founder: John T. Curtis, Sr.
- High School Principal: Leon Curtis
- Junior High Principal: Lance Rickner
- Lower School Principal: Deborah Eutsler
- Headmaster: John T. Curtis, Jr.
- Grades: Pre K–12
- Enrollment: 850
- Campus: Urban
- Colors: Red, white and blue
- Mascot: Patriot
- Nickname: Patriots
- Rival: Archbishop Rummel Raiders
- Website: www.johncurtis.com

John Curtis Christian School is a co-educational, non-sectarian, private Christian K-12 school in River Ridge, Louisiana, in the United States. The school colors are red, white and blue and the school's nickname is Patriots.

== History ==
The school was founded in 1962 by John T. Curtis, Sr., on the second floor of the Carrollton Avenue Baptist Church. On its opening day it had only sixteen students, but by the end of the year it had over forty students. In 1963, Curtis moved the school to its current location on Jefferson Highway in River Ridge, Louisiana.

== Athletics ==
John Curtis Christian athletics competes in the LHSAA.

=== Championships ===
- Football –

- (1) National championship: 2012
- (28) State championships: 1975, 1977, 1979, 1980, 1981, 1983, 1984, 1985, 1987, 1988, 1990, 1993, 1996, 1997, 1998, 1999, 2001, 2002, 2004, 2005, 2006, 2007, 2008, 2011, 2012, 2013, 2018, 2022

- Baseball – 9 state championships
- Boys Basketball – 2 state championship
- Girls Basketball – 11 state championships
- Boys Cross Country – 2 state championships
- Girls Cross Country – 1 state runner-up
- Softball – 10 state championships
- Boys Indoor Track and Field – 4 state championships
- Boys Outdoor Track and Field – 10 state championships
- Girls Volleyball – 2 state championships
- Wrestling – 3 state runners-up

=== Football ===
==== Coaches ====
- John T. Curtis Jr. – Head football coach (1969–present), is the winningest head coach in high school football history and all of football passing the record in 2023 season and is the current leader in wins for active head coaches. He is the second high school head football coach to ever reach the 600-win mark. Curtis has a record of 623–79–6 through the 2023 season including one national championship (2012) and twenty-eight Louisiana state championships.

== Notable alumni ==
- Tony Bua, NFL linebacker for the Miami Dolphins
- Reggie Dupard, NFL wide receiver and 1st round draft pick for the New England Patriots and Washington Redskins
- Malachi Dupre, NFL wide receiver and 7th round draft pick for the Green Bay Packers, Buffalo Bills, Houston Texans, Seattle Seahawks, Arizona Cardinals and Los Angeles Chargers
- Alan Faneca, NFL offensive guard and two-time offensive lineman of the Year for the Pittsburgh Steelers, New York Jets and Arizona Cardinals; 2021 Inductee into the Pro Football Hall of Fame
- Dillon Gordon, NFL offensive tackle for the Philadelphia Eagles, Kansas City Chiefs and Carolina Panthers
- Melvin Hayes, NFL offensive tackle and 4th round draft pick for the New York Jets and Tennessee Oilers
- Chris Howard, NFL running back and 5th round draft pick for the Jacksonville Jaguars and Denver Broncos
- Joe McKnight, NFL running back and 4th round draft pick for the New York Jets and Kansas City Chiefs
- Duke Riley, NFL linebacker and 3rd round draft pick for the Atlanta Falcons and Philadelphia Eagles
- Michael Stonebreaker, NFL linebacker and 9th round draft pick for the Chicago Bears and New Orleans Saints
- Garret Wallow, NFL linebacker for the Houston Texans
- Jonathan Wells, NFL running back and 4th round draft pick for the Houston Texans and Indianapolis Colts
- Danny Wimprine, NFL quarterback for the Cleveland Browns
- Kenny Young, NFL linebacker for the Baltimore Ravens and Los Angeles Rams
- Rachel Pizzolato, model, influencer, actress

== Gallery ==
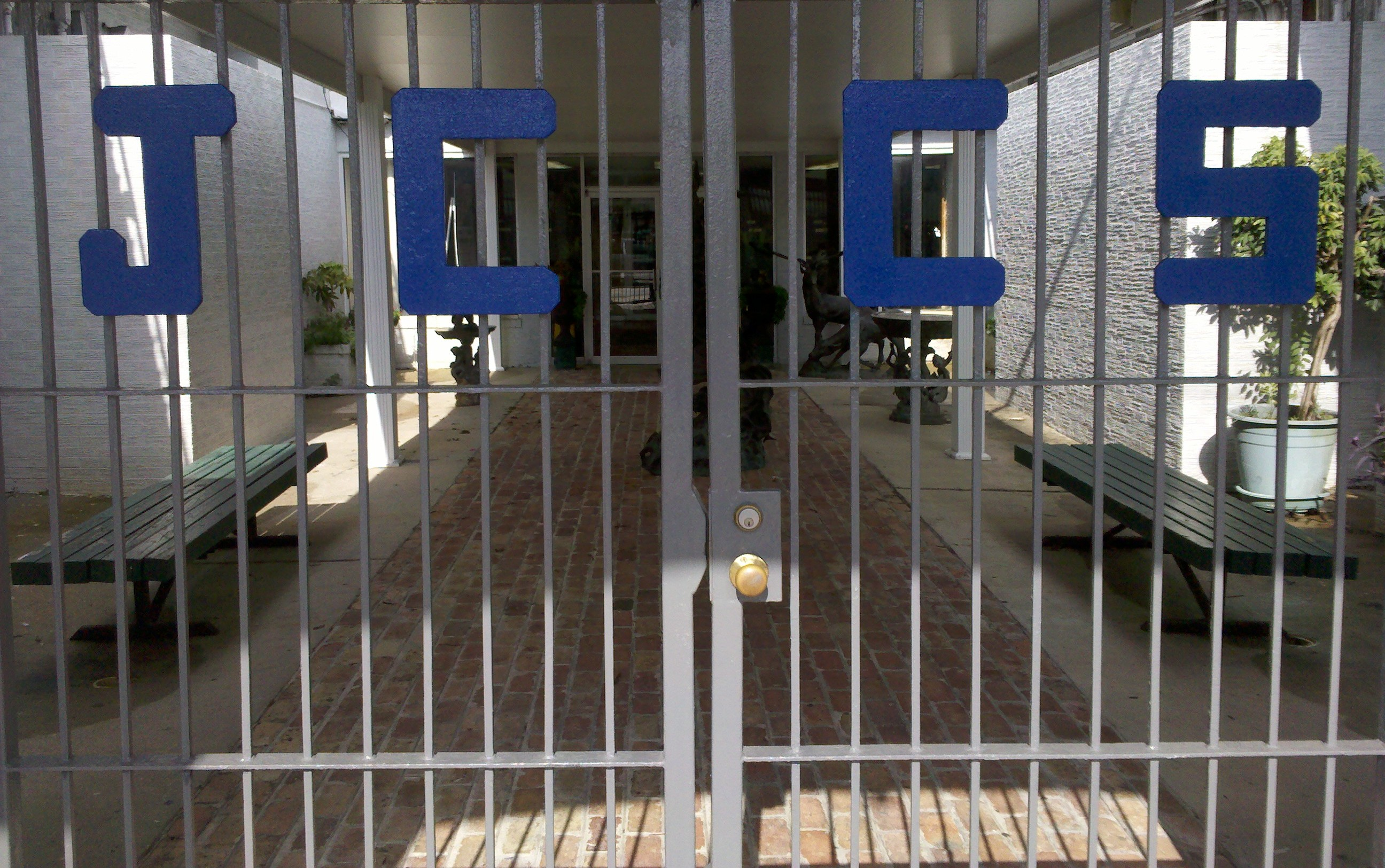
John Curtis Christian High school, Front Gate

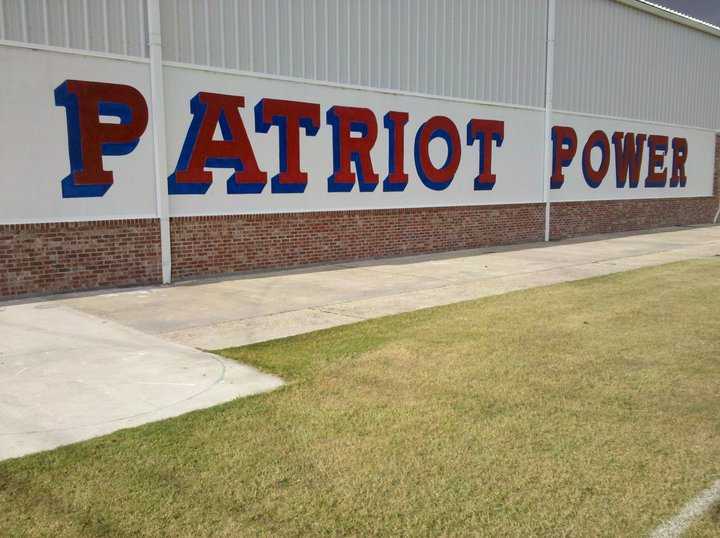
John Curtis Christian High School Gymnasium, Patriot Power sign

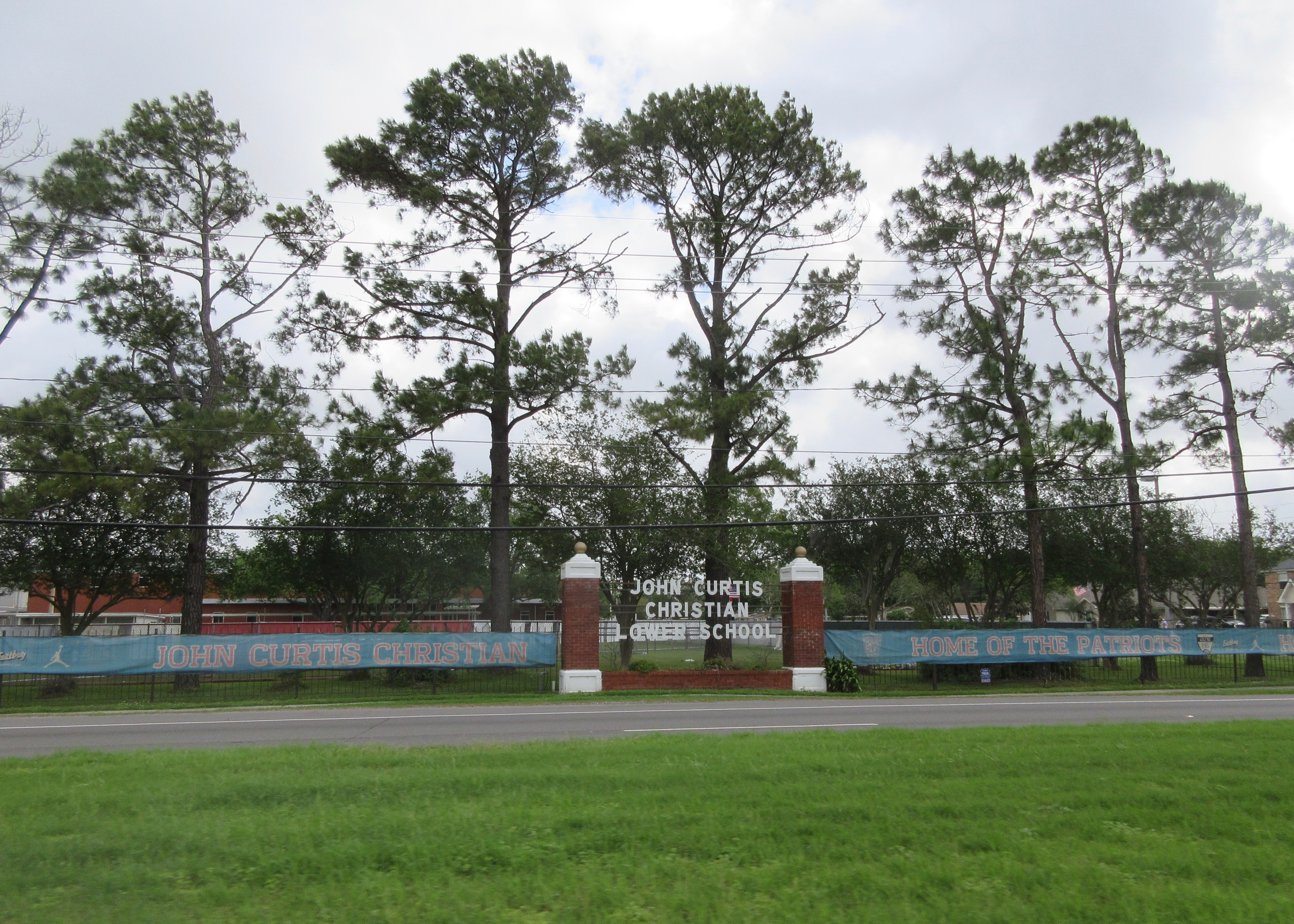
John Curtis Christian Lower School, Campus

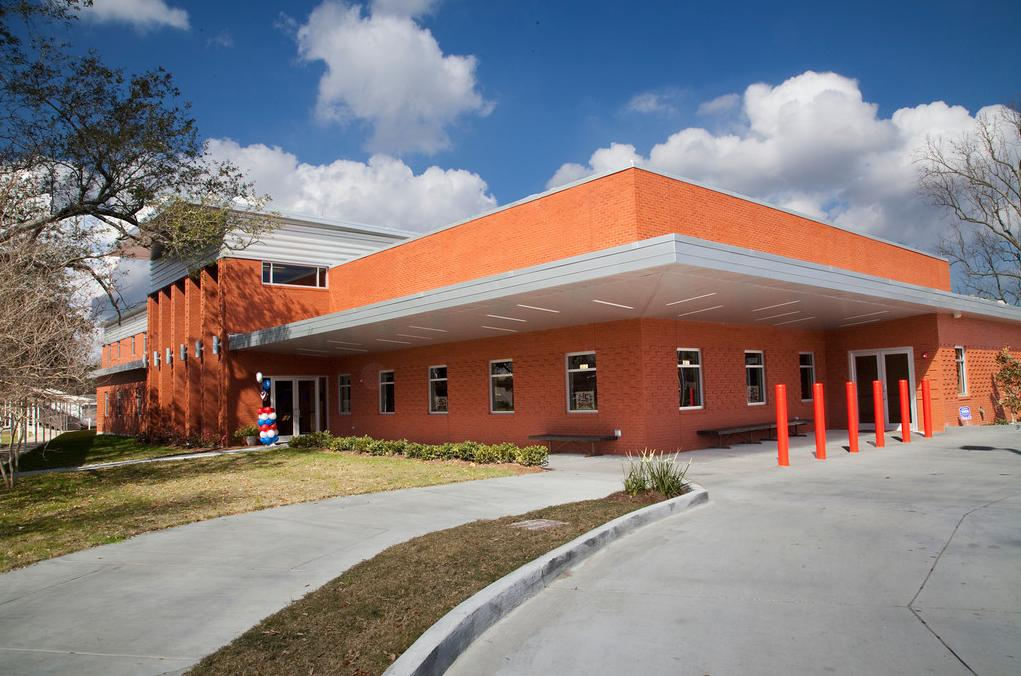
John Curtis Christian Lower School, Main Building
