= River Ridge, Louisiana =

- Census-designated place
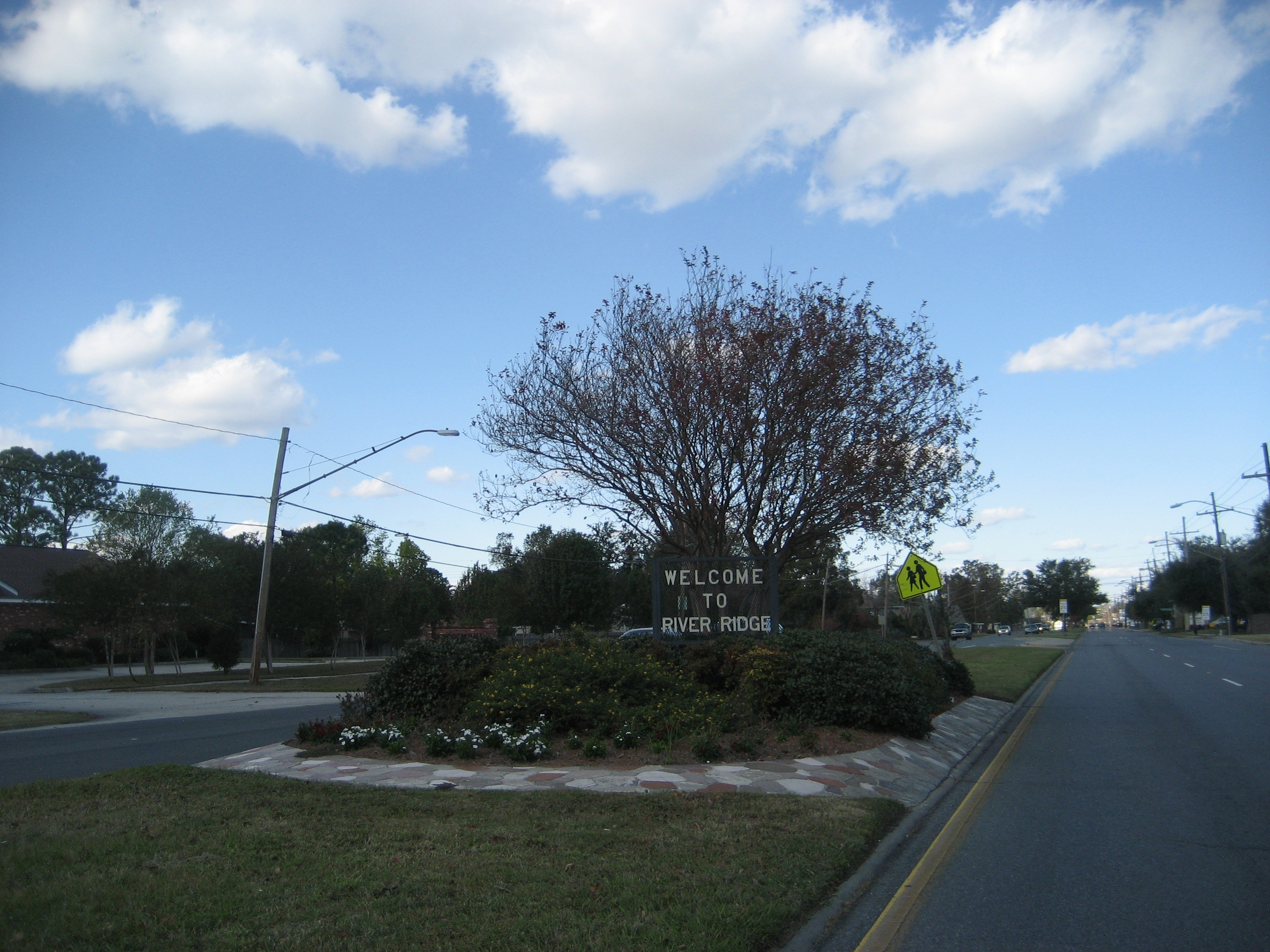
- Welcome sign on Jefferson Highway

- Location of River Ridge in Louisiana
- Coordinates: 29°57′43″N 90°13′04″W
- Country: United States
- State: Louisiana
- Parish: Jefferson

Area
  - Total: 3.55 sq mi (9.19 km^{2})
  - Land: 2.80 sq mi (7.24 km^{2})
  - Water: 0.75 sq mi (1.94 km^{2})

Population (2020)
  - Total: 13,591
  - Density: 4,861.3/sq mi (1,876.97/km^{2})
- Time zone: UTC-6 (CST)
  - Summer (DST): UTC-5 (CDT)
- ZIP Code: 70123
- Area code: 504
- GNIS feature ID: 546872

River Ridge is an unincorporated community and census-designated place (CDP) in Jefferson Parish, Louisiana, United States. It is a suburb of New Orleans. The population was 13,591 in 2020.

== History ==
The land that is now River Ridge was developed by French colonists and their descendants in the late 18th and early 19th centuries for large sugar plantations; these lined the Mississippi River in traditional French long-lot fashion. The plantations had relatively narrow waterfronts to provide water access and extended deeply back from the river. These plantations were developed by French colonists and their descendants; they depended on the labor of African slaves. Major landowners included members of the Trudeau and Sauvé families. (Pierre Sauvé (1805–1867) had a major plantation here known as Providence.)

The alignments of the major streets in the area are vestiges of this era. Sauve Road continues to be a main thoroughfare in River Ridge (the street name and sign omitting the accent mark).

In 1849, a major flooding event known as Sauvé's Crevasse occurred. The crude river levee at the Sauvé Providence plantation failed under pressure of high water on the Mississippi. The massive flood inundated much of the land to the east, including parts of New Orleans. This crevasse occurred where a former meander of the Mississippi River once branched to form the Metairie and Gentilly Ridges.

In the early 20th century, an interurban transit line was constructed through this area. It served to connect the cities of New Orleans and Kenner. It was aligned along the present course of Jefferson Highway, which was improved from earlier roads.

For many years, the area remained rural farmland until the post-World War II suburbanization era. Aided by funding under the G.I. Bill, which enabled veterans to buy houses, large-scale suburban development began in the early 1950s. By 1965, virtually all of the area along the Mississippi River between Harahan and Kenner was developed. This area at the time was known as "Little Farms", a name which well described its pre-urban history; this was also the place name officially recognized by the Post Office. (To this day, Little Farms Avenue remains a major River Ridge thoroughfare.) Other subdivision names, such as "East Bank" and "Rural Acres," were used as place names for the area at the time.

To eliminate confusion and create some sense of community identity, the area between Kenner, Harahan, Metairie, and the Mississippi River was officially renamed "River Ridge" in 1974.

In 2019, a baseball team from River Ridge won the Little League World Series, becoming the first team from Louisiana to do so. They also became the first team since 2001 to lose their opening game but win the championship.

== Geography ==
River Ridge is located along a 3-mile (5 km) stretch of Jefferson Highway (Louisiana Highway 48). Its boundaries include Harahan to the east, Kenner to the northwest, Metairie to the north, and the Mississippi River to the southwest. Across the Mississippi is the unincorporated community of Waggaman.

River Ridge is located at 29.958265°N 90.221894°W. According to the United States Census Bureau, the CDP has a total area of 3.55 square miles (9.19 km^{2}), of which 2.80 square miles (7.24 km^{2}) are land and 0.75 square miles (1.95 km^{2}), or 21.18%, are water.

== Demographics ==
Historical population
| Census | Pop. | Note | %± |
|---|---|---|---|
| 1980 | 17,146 | | — |
| 1990 | 14,800 | | −13.7% |
| 2000 | 14,588 | | −1.4% |
| 2010 | 13,494 | | −7.5% |
| 2020 | 13,591 | | 0.7% |
U.S. Decennial Census; 1950 1960 1970 1980; 1990 2000 2010

River Ridge first appeared as a census-designated place in the 1980 U.S. Census.

River Ridge racial composition as of 2020
| Race | Number | Percentage |
|---|---|---|
| White (non-Hispanic) | 9,965 | 73.32% |
| Black or African American (non-Hispanic) | 1,604 | 11.8% |
| Native American | 22 | 0.16% |
| Asian | 161 | 1.18% |
| Pacific Islander | 2 | 0.01% |
| Other/Mixed | 466 | 3.43% |
| Hispanic or Latino | 1,371 | 10.09% |

At the census of 2000, there were 14,588 people, 6,030 households, and 4,082 families residing in the CDP. The population density was 5,181.6 inhabitants per square mile (2,000.6/km^{2}). There were 6,325 housing units at an average density of 2,246.6 units per square mile (867.4 units/km^{2}). The racial makeup of the CDP was 86.76% White, 10.99% African American, 0.23% Native American, 0.78% Asian, 0.03% Pacific Islander, 0.45% from other races, and 0.76% from two or more races. Hispanics or Latinos of any race were 2.92% of the population. At the 2020 United States census, there were 13,591 people, 5,546 households, and 3,579 families residing in the CDP, reflecting a slight population decline from the 2000 U.S. census. Its racial and ethnic makeup by 2020 was 73.32% non-Hispanic white, 11.8% Black or African American, 0.16% Native American, 1.18% Asian, 0.01% Pacific Islander, 3.43% two or more races, and 10.09% Hispanic or Latino American, reflecting the diversification of the United States at the 2020 census.

== Culture ==
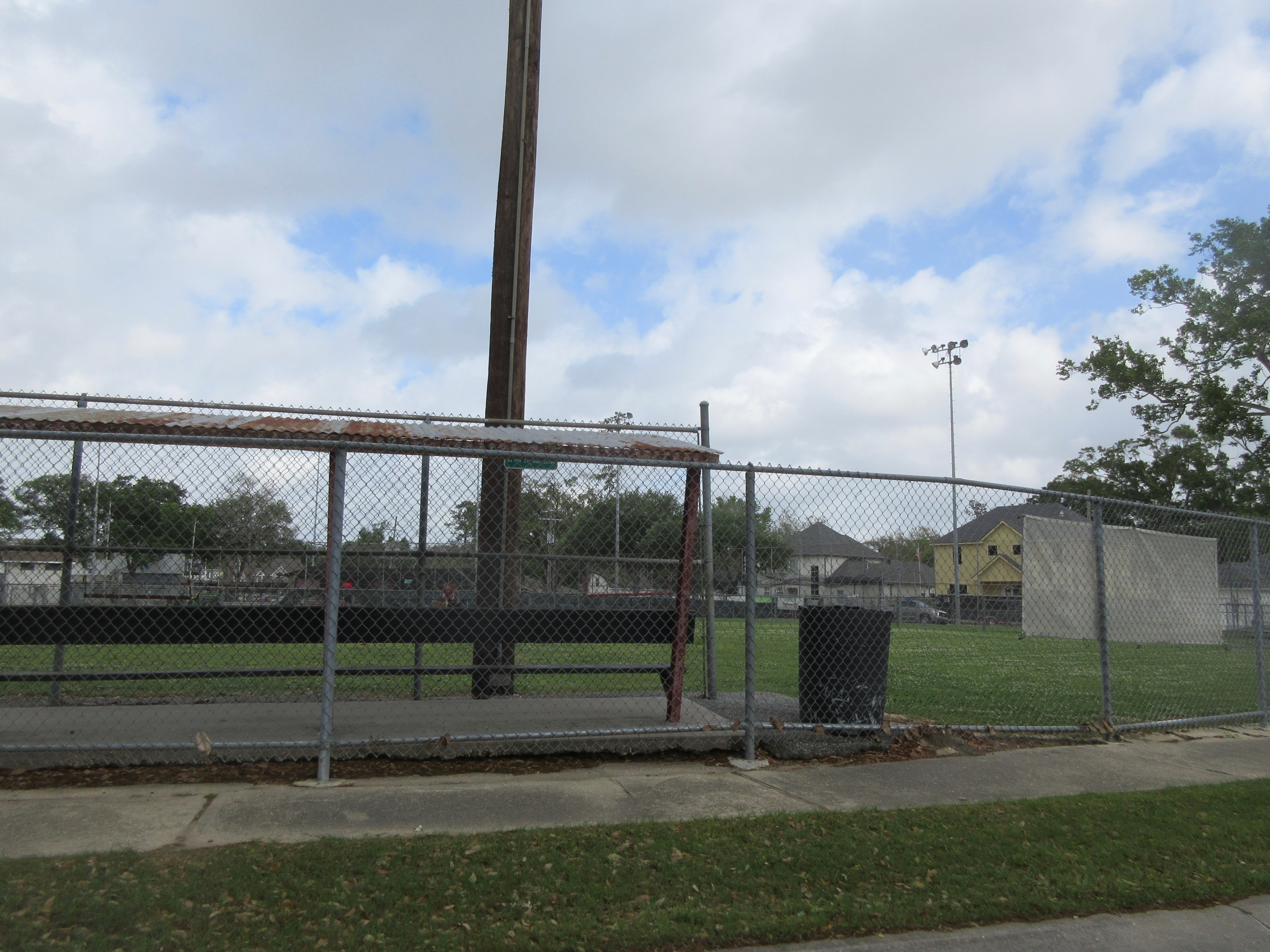
Little Farms Park

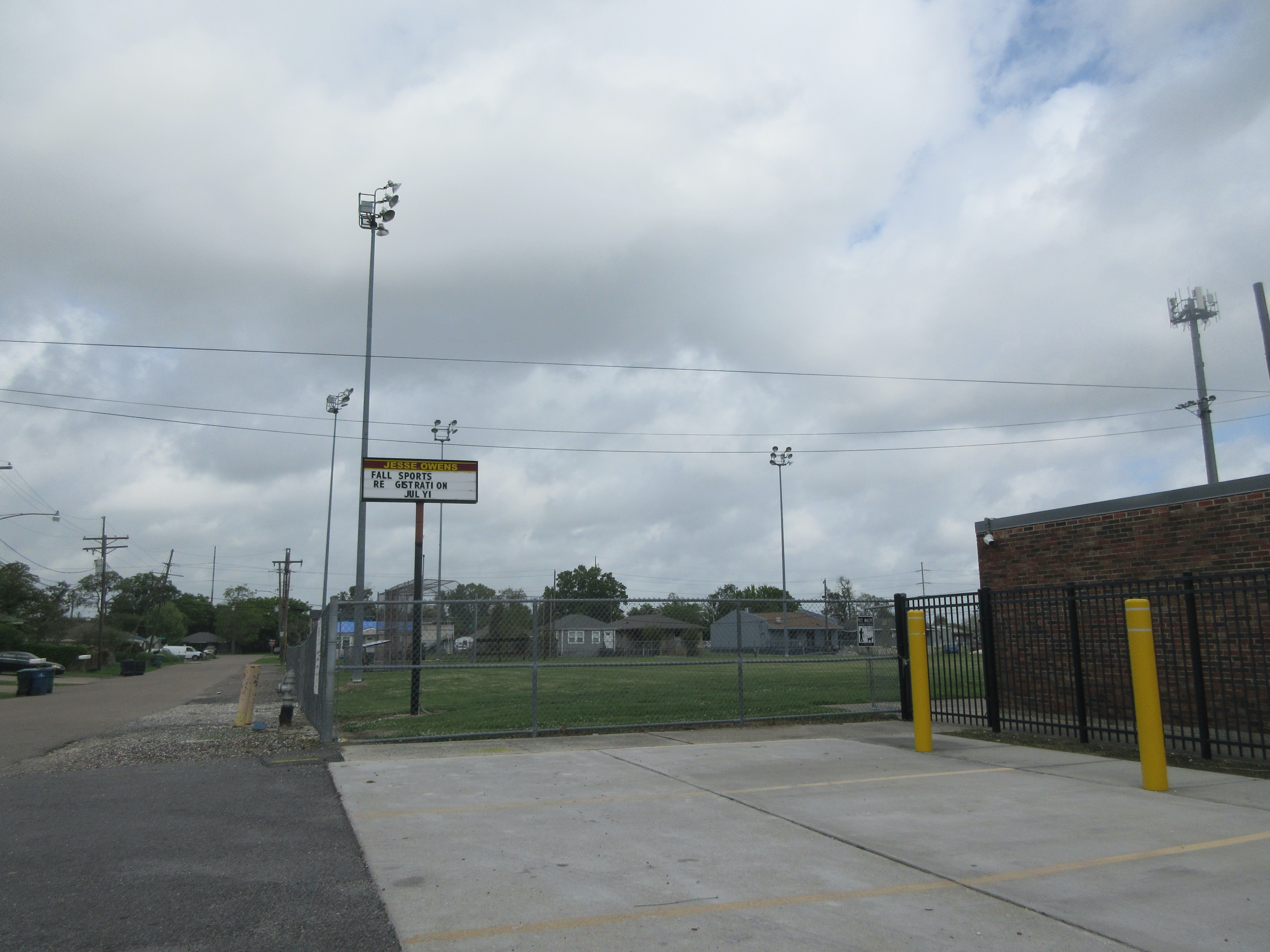
Jesse Owens Park

Public parks include Little Farms Park and Jesse Owens Park & Playground.

- Paradise Manor Community Club is the swimming and tennis club for River Ridge.
- According to the Census 2000, River Ridge had 30 houses valued at $1,000,000 or more.

== Education ==
Jefferson Parish Public Schools operates public schools. Students are zoned to Hazel Park/Hilda Knoff School (formerly an elementary school) for grades PreK-8. Students are zoned to Riverdale High School in Jefferson.

Formerly, Hazel Park took elementary grades, while Riverdale Middle School in Jefferson (now a part of Jefferson PK-8) took middle school grades.

In regards to the advanced studies academies, students are zoned to Airline Park Academy.

St. Matthew Catholic School (of the Roman Catholic Archdiocese of New Orleans) is in River Ridge. Many of the Catholic high schools are close by, such as Archbishop Rummel High School and Archbishop Chapelle. Non-Catholic schools located nearby include St. Martin's Episcopal School, Kehoe-France, John Curtis, and Ridgewood Preparatory School.

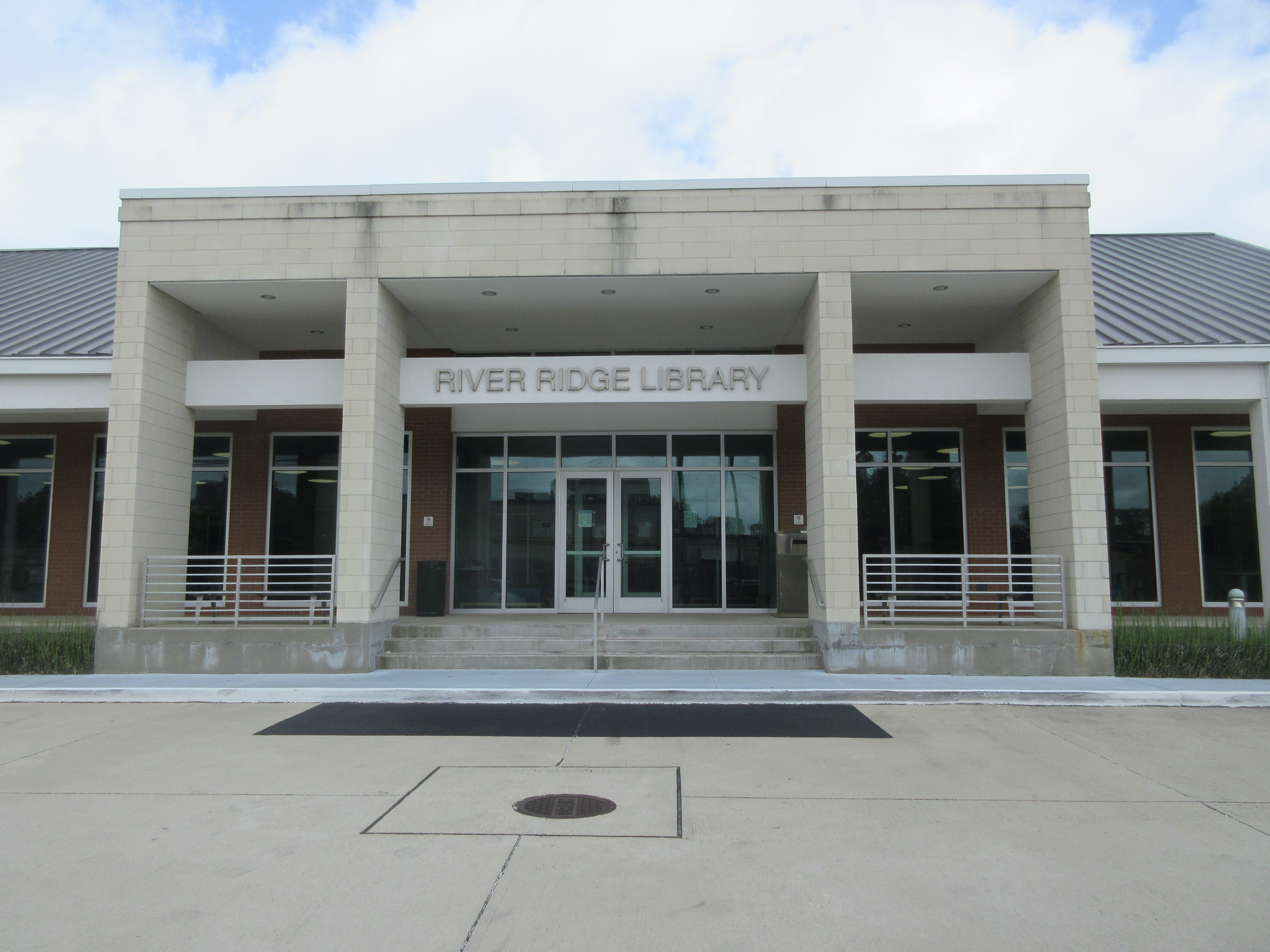
River Ridge Library

Jefferson Parish Library operates the River Ridge Branch Library in River Ridge. The library held its grand opening ceremony on Friday, May 4, 2018.

== Athletics ==
In August 2019, the Little League baseball team from River Ridge made history by being the first team from Louisiana to win the US Championship and World Series Final.
