= New Orleans Catholic League =

Sports league in Louisiana, USA

The Catholic League (LHSAA district 9-5A) is a high school sports league in the Greater New Orleans area.

== History ==
The history of the Catholic League can be traced back to 1895, but the first season of the Catholic League as we know it was in 1955. The league is named for having mostly New Orleans' oldest and biggest Catholic schools, though some public schools have played in the league as well.

Chalmette High School in St. Bernard Parish had the longest tenure of any public school in the Catholic League. Chalmette was admitted to the Catholic League, then District 6-AAAA, in 1970 and stayed for 18 years. Chalmette was an all-boys school through the 1987-88 school year, but played one more year in the league after admitting girls, since the LHSAA reclassifies schools in November of even-numbered years for the following two school terms. Chalmette exited the Catholic League for the 1989-90 school year, then dropped out of the highest classification when the LHSAA added a new classification for the 1991-92 term. The Owls did not rejoin the Catholic League until 2007, when Chalmette became the lone high school in St. Bernard following the devastation of Hurricane Katrina in 2005, and thus had a 5A enrollment.

In 1992, the LHSAA's first classification plan for the 1993–94 and 1994-95 school years would have dissolved the Catholic League, spreading the seven schools amongst three districts and mixing them with public schools from Orleans and Jefferson Parishes. The plan drew serious objections from both Catholic and public schools: the Catholic League schools were afraid of significant financial losses, since public schools generally have far less fan support than Catholic schools; and the public schools feared competitive imbalance. Eventually, the Catholic League was kept intact, with Slidell High School added, a move which was sharply criticized by the St. Tammany Parish school board and Slidell supporters, who were angered to see longtime rivalries with fellow St. Tammany schools Covington and Mandeville placed on hiatus. Slidell was moved out of the Catholic League and back into a St. Tammany-based district in 1995-96.

In 2010, LHSAA enrollment figures dropped Archbishop Shaw High School and St. Augustine High School into class 4A, leaving the district with three Catholic schools which had to be combined with three public schools to form a new district.

WLAE-TV 32 in New Orleans has produced a documentary named Glory Days, with part 1, focusing on the 1950s and 60s, airing in November 2010, and part 2 airing in September 2012, which tells the tale of the 1970s, when the Catholic League was regarded as the toughest high school sporting district in America. More parts are planned.

=== 2010 dissolution ===
The LHSAA passed a rule in 2005 designed to limit schools with low enrollments playing "up" in class, believing that football powers such as John Curtis Christian School and Evangel Christian Academy were using 4A and 5A status, respectively, to attract students to their schools. Curtis was dropped to 2A in 2005, and Evangel to 1A before moving up to 2A in 2007. The effects of this rule shook up the Catholic League. De La Salle, which became a co-educational school in the 1992-93 school year, dropped out voluntarily after the 2002-2003 school year after being a member of the league since 1955. Archbishop Shaw left the league after 2005, and Holy Cross, with enrollment declining since Katrina and its school nearly destroyed by the levee breaches along the Industrial Canal, moved down to 4A for 2007 and further down to 3A for 2009. The league, left with four schools and in danger of being combined with a nearby Jefferson Parish public school league, accepted public school and former member Chalmette High School to bring itself back to five schools and remain a standalone league.

Reclassification in 2009 added Archbishop Shaw back into the Catholic League, as their enrollment increased over the 5A threshold. It allowed Chalmette High School to move to a neighboring district of Jefferson Parish public schools where they hoped to be more competitive.

The lingering effects of Katrina and a nationwide recession affected enrollment at St. Augustine and Archbishop Shaw enough to drop the two schools to class 4A in the 2010 reclassification, effective for the fall 2011 school semester. As a result, three 5A Catholic League schools would be left in the New Orleans area. Jesuit principal Michael Giambellaca authored a proposal to call a special LHSAA meeting mainly to vote to allow schools to play above their enrollment classification, but his proposal was defeated.

The new district proposal featured Jesuit, Brother Martin, and Archbishop Rummel combined with the 5A Jefferson Parish Public School athletic district of John Ehret, L.W. Higgins, West Jefferson, Alfred Bonnabel, and Grace King, as well as public school and former Catholic League member Chalmette. There was some debate as to whether the new district could still be called a "Catholic League", but games between the Catholic schools (and former members now in 4A) would still probably be referred to as Catholic League games.

On November 10, 2010, the LHSAA approved the final districts for the 2011–12 and 2012-13 school years. Brother Martin, Jesuit and Rummel joined a Class 5A district with Chalmette, Grace King and West Jefferson (Grace King will not play a district schedule in football). Bonnabel, John Ehret and Higgins were assigned to a different 5A district with Destrehan, Hahnville and East St. John high schools to the west.

For the 2011 and 2012 football seasons, Rummel maintained its rivalry games with Holy Cross, St. Augustine and Shaw, although the Shaw-Rummel games were canceled by tropical systems, Tropical Storm Lee in 2011 and Hurricane Isaac in 2012. Jesuit played Holy Cross and Shaw, but not St. Augustine, and Brother Martin only played St. Augustine, continuing the rivalry between the Gentilly schools.

=== Catholic League reforms for 2013 ===
At its January 2012 convention, the LHSAA approved a new proposal by Giambelluca which allowed schools to play up from their enrollment-based classification by one class, effective with the 2013-14 school year.

When the LHSAA began its reclassification for the 2013–14 and 2014-15 school years in November 2012, Holy Cross, St. Augustine and Shaw all declared they would play up from 4A to 5A. The LHSAA placed those three schools with Brother Martin, Jesuit and Rummel in the new District 9-5A to re-form the Catholic League. All-girls Catholic schools Chapelle, Dominican and Mount Carmel were also placed in the district. The plan was approved by the LHSAA Executive Committee on December 12.

Grace King and West Jefferson were placed in District 8-5A with the other Jefferson Parish schools in 5A: Bonnabel, Higgins, John Ehret and Helen Cox, which opted to play up from 4A. Destrehan, East St. John and Hahnville were placed in District 7-5A with schools from the Houma-Thibodaux area: Central Lafourche, H.L. Bourgeois, South Lafourche, Terrebonne and Thibodaux. Chalmette administrators appealed to be placed in the Jefferson Parish district 8-5A, but not without some dissent from their fanbase.

=== John Curtis joins ===
In November 2014, John Curtis football coach and school headmaster J.T. Curtis, Jr. declared the Patriots would play up to Class 5A in all sports. The LHSAA placed John Curtis in the Catholic League, making it the first private non-Catholic school to become a member.

For the 2014 football season, Curtis played in a Class 2A district during the regular season, but played in the Division I select state playoffs, which included the six then-current members of the Catholic League, as well as Evangel; St. Paul's, a Catholic all-boys school in Covington; and two co-educational Catholic schools in Lafayette, St. Thomas More and Teurlings Catholic. The Patriots lost the Division I championship game to Jesuit, 17-14.

=== Edna Karr joins ===
For 2022—24 LHSAA redistricting period, Edna Karr joined the league while Archbishop Shaw left the league moving to a lower classification. Despite Karr's efforts to leave the Catholic League during the 2024-26 LHSAA redistricting period, the Cougars were again placed in the Catholic League by the LHSAA. In the 2026-28 LHSAA redistricting period, Edna Karr once again was originally placed into the Public School League, but they appealled to return to the Catholic League and were placed in the Catholic League for the 2026-28 school years.

=== Warren Easton joins ===
For the 2024-26 LHSAA redistricting period, Warren Easton will join the Catholic League.

=== Chalmette rejoins ===
For the 2026-28 LHSAA redistricting period, Chalmette was placed in the Catholic League, replacing Warren Easton, who went to the Public School League.

== Current members (effective through 2024-26 school year) ==
- Archbishop Chapelle (all-girls school; 1993-)
- Archbishop Rummel (1963–)
- Brother Martin (1969–)
- Chalmette (public) (1970–1989, 2007–2009, 2011–2013, 2026-)
- Edna Karr (2022–)
- Holy Cross (1955–2007; 2013–)
- Jesuit (1955–)
- John Curtis Christian (2015–)
- Mount Carmel Academy (all-girls school; 1993-)
- St. Augustine (1967–2011; 2013–)
  - St. Augustine was the first all-Negro school admitted to the Louisiana High School Athletic Association following a successful suit in the United States District Court for the Eastern District of Louisiana.
- St. Mary's Dominican (all-girls school; 1993-)

== Former members ==
- Archbishop Shaw (1963–2005; 2009–2011; 2013–2021) (Dropped to 4A)
- De La Salle (1955–2003) (Dropped to 4A)
- Redemptorist (1955–1973) (Dropped to 3A; renamed Redeemer in 1980 and later Redeemer-Seton; closed after Hurricane Katrina)
- Slidell (public) (1993–1995) (returned to 5A Northshore district)
- Cor Jesu (1965–1968) (merged with St. Aloysius to form Brother Martin High School)
- Terrebonne (Houma) (public) (1964–1965)
- Thibodaux (public) (1964–1965)
- South Terrebonne (Bourg) (public) (1964–1965)
  - Terrebonne, Thibodaux and South Terrebonne all returned to the Class 3A/4A "Bayou District" in 1966 when Central Lafourche and South Lafourche were formed from the consolidation of smaller schools.
- Holy Name of Mary (1956-1957) (Dropped to Class B)
- St. Aloysius (1955–1968) (merged with Cor Jesu to form Brother Martin high School)
- West Jefferson (Harvey) (public) (2011–2013) (returned to Public School League)
- Grace King (Metairie) (public; football played an independent schedule) (2011–2013) (returned to Public School League then closed in 2023)
- Warren Easton (2024-2025) (joined Public School League)

== Football champions since 1955 ==
Bold indicates that the team won the state championship. Italic indicates that the team was state runner-up.

- Archbishop Rummel (17) — 1973, 1974, 1980, 1985, 1999, 2000, 2001, 2002, 2003, 2005, 2006, 2007, 2009, **2012**, 2014, 2015, **2019**
- Jesuit (17) — 1957, 1958, 1959, **1960**, 1962, 1964, 1965, 1969, 1970, 1981, 1984, 1997, 2004, 2007, 2010, 2011, 2021
- St. Augustine (17) — 1970, 1971, 1973, **1975**, 1977, **1978**, **1979**, 1982, 1984, 1987, 1988, 1992, 1993, 1995, 2010, 2013, 2026
- Archbishop Shaw (16) — 1976, 1977, 1979, 1983, 1985, 1986, **1987**, 1988, 1989, 1990, 1991, 1994, 1996, 1997, 1998, 2000
- Brother Martin (9) — **1971**, 1972, 1977, 1983, 1985, 1992, 2007, 2008, 2020
- Holy Cross (8) — **1963**, 1964, 1966, 1967, 1970, 1983, 1995, 2002
- De La Salle (4) — 1957, 1961, 1968, 1969
- John Curtis (4) — 2016, 2017, **2018**
- Edna Karr (4) — 2022, 2023, **2024**, **2025**
- Redemptorist (2) — 1956, 1957
- Terrebonne (2) — 1964, 1965
- St. Aloysius (2) — 1955, 1957

In addition, the following teams have played for the state championship without winning district:

- 1963: Jesuit
- 1971: St. Augustine
- 1978: Jesuit
- 1987: Shaw (won state championship)
- 1989: Brother Martin
- 2000: Shaw
- 2013: Rummel (won state championship)
- 2014: Jesuit (won state championship)
- 2022: Brother Martin
- 2022: John Curtis (won state championship)
- 2025: St. Augustine

The state championships won by the Catholic League

- Jesuit: 1933, 1940, 1941, 1943, 1946, 1953, 1960, 2014
- St. Augustine: 1975, 1978, 1979
- Archbishop Rummel: 2012, 2013, 2019
- Holy Cross: 1945, 1963
- Archbishop Shaw: 1987
- Brother Martin: 1971
- John Curtis: 2018, 2022
- Edna Karr: 2024, 2025

Five state championship games, in 1963 (Holy Cross 13, Jesuit 6), 1971 (Brother Martin 23, St. Augustine 0), 1978 (St. Augustine 14, Jesuit 7), 2022 (John Curtis 23, Brother Martin 0), and 2025 (Edna Karr 49, St. Augustine 14) have been all-Catholic League affairs. Each game drew more than 25,000 fans; the 1978 Jesuit-St. Augustine game drew more than 42,000 in the first state championship game to be contested in the Louisiana Superdome.

== Highest classification basketball state champions ==
- Jesuit (8) — 1939, 1944, 1946, 1948, 1964, 1965, 1966, 2001
- Brother Martin (6) — 1970, 1971, 1974, 2004, 2005, 2010
- St. Aloysius (6) — 1941, 1947, 1949, 1951, 1952, 1953
- St. Augustine (6) — 1983, 1992, 1995, 1999, 2011, 2021
- De La Salle (5) — 1957, 1958, 1959, 1962, 1986
- Holy Cross (3) — 1942, 1943, 1945
- Archbishop Rummel (2) — 1977, 1978
- Archbishop Shaw (2) — 1989, 1997
- John Curtis (1) — 2026

In 2000, Archbishop Shaw won the 5A championship game but was later forced to forfeit the game.

== Highest classification baseball state champions ==
- Jesuit (21) — 1933, 1934, 1935, 1936, 1937, 1938, 1940, 1941, 1945, 1946, 1947, 1950, 1961, 1979, 1980, 1985, 2002, 2005, 2007, 2011, 2021, 2023
- De La Salle (6) — 1958, 1959, 1962, 1964, 1977, 1988
- Archbishop Rummel (5) — 1974, 1981, 1987, 1989, 1997
- St. Aloysius (4) — 1952, 1953, 1954, 1955
- Holy Cross (2) — 1944, 1969
- Brother Martin (2) — 1984, 1996
- John Curtis (2) — 2017, 2018

== Soccer state champions ==
- Jesuit (14) — 1984, 1987, 1995, 1999, 2002, 2003, 2005, 2007, 2009, 2010, 2012, 2018, 2024, 2026
- De La Salle (3) — 1977, 1982, 1997
- Brother Martin (2) — 2000, 2001
- Archbishop Rummel (2) — 1968, 1974
- Holy Cross (2) — 1973; 2018 (Div. II)
- Redemptorist (1) — 1971

== State wrestling champions ==
- Holy Cross (26+3) — 1945, 1946, 1947, 1948, 1949, 1950, 1952, 1953, 1954, 1955, 1956, 1957, 1958, 1959, 1960, 1961, 1962, 1963, 1964, 1965, 1967, 1968, 1983, 1988#, 2017, 2026 (Holy Cross won Division II wrestling titles in 2009 and 2013, and Division III in 2011)
- Jesuit (26) — 1951, 1972, 1973, 1974, 1976, 1977, 1980, 1981, 1988#, 1989, 1990, 1991, 1992, 1993, 1994, 1995, 1996, 1997, 1998, 2004, 2005, 2006, 2009, 2023, 2024, 2025
- Brother Martin (21) — 1979, 1982, 1984, 1985, 1986, 1987, 1999, 2000, 2001, 2002, 2003, 2007, 2012, 2013, 2014, 2015, 2016, 2018, 2019, 2020, 2022
- De La Salle (3+2) – 1969, 1970, 1971 (De La Salle won Division III championships in 2016 and 2017 after leaving the Catholic League)
- Archbishop Shaw (0+2) – Shaw did not have a wrestling team until 2001-02. It has won Division III state championships in 2023 and 2024 after dropping out of the Catholic League.
- Rummel (1) — 2011
1. --The 1988 Division I state tournament ended in a three-way tie for first place between Jesuit, Holy Cross and Bonnabel, the only time this has occurred in any LHSAA sport.

== Girls' Catholic League ==
The following schools were members of a parallel 5A "Catholic League" for girls' sports in the New Orleans area.

- Mount Carmel Academy
- Archbishop Chapelle
- Dominican

== Former Girls' Catholic League members ==
- Academy of Our Lady (consolidation of Archbishop Blenk and Immaculata High Schools) (dropped to 4A)
- Ursuline Academy (dropped to 3A)

== See also ==
- List of Louisiana high school athletic districts
