= Chachere =

Chachere is a surname. Notable people with the surname include:

- Andre Chachere (born 1996), American football player
- Garret Chachere (born 1969), American football coach and former player
- Tony Chachere (1905–1995), American businessman and chef
