= Brother Martin High School =

Prep school in Louisiana

Location
- 4401 Elysian Fields Avenue; New Orleans, (Orleans Parish), Louisiana 70122 U.S. 30°0′13″N 90°3′32″W

Information
- Former names: St. Aloysius College (1869–1969); Cor Jesu High School (1954–1969)
- School type: Private, college-preparatory school
- Motto: Latin: Ametur Cor Jesu! Ametur Cor Mariae! English: Loved be the heart of Jesus! Loved be the heart of Mary!
- Religious affiliations: Roman Catholic; (Brothers of the Sacred Heart)
- Established: 1869; 157 years ago
- Founder: Archbishop Jean-Marie Odin
- President: Gregory M. Rando
- Principal: Ryan J. Gallagher
- Grades: 8–12
- Gender: Boys
- Enrollment: 1100+
- Colors: Crimson and gold
- Athletics conference: New Orleans Catholic League (District 9-5A)
- Sports: Baseball; basketball; football; bowling; cross country; golf; powerlifting; soccer; swimming; tennis; track; wrestling
- Mascot: Crusader
- Nickname: Crusaders
- Rival: St. Augustine Purple Knights; Holy Cross Tigers; Jesuit Blue Jays
- Accreditation: Southern Association of Colleges and Schools
- Publication: The Pen And The Sword (literary magazine)
- Yearbook: Yesterday
- Tuition: $11,838 + $650 fees = $12,488 total (2023-24)
- Affiliations: National Catholic Education Association; Association for Supervision and Curriculum Development; National Association of Secondary School Principals; Louisiana High School Athletic Association
- Website: brothermartin.com

Brother Martin High School is a private, Catholic, all-boys college preparatory school run by the United States Province of the Brothers of the Sacred Heart in New Orleans, Louisiana. It is located in the Roman Catholic Archdiocese of New Orleans.

== History ==
The school was founded by the brothers in 1869 as St. Aloysius College. Another high school, Cor Jesu High School, was later merged into the school, which later took on its current name.

=== Hurricane Katrina ===
Hurricane Katrina forced the school to close in August 2005. Brother Martin opened a temporary facility at Catholic High School in Baton Rouge for their students. Catholic High allowed students and faculty of Brother Martin to use their facilities during its after hours. Displaced Brother Martin students continued to learn here for the remainder of 2005. Brother Martin High School reopened its doors in New Orleans in January 2006 sustaining minimal flood damage to the bottom floors. Many faculty and volunteers helped renovate and repair the damaged sections of the school.

== Campus ==
Brother Martin High School is located on Elysian Fields Avenue in Gentilly, an established residential neighborhood in New Orleans. The school campus includes Cor Jesu Hall, the oldest building on the current campus; built in 1954, the Conlin Gymnasium (now fully air-conditioned), the largest high school gym in the city, and the newest components on campus; the Thomas F. and Elaine P. Ridgley Fine Arts and Athletic Center, commonly known as the "Ridgley Center", E. A. Farley Field, used for Soccer, Baseball and non-varsity football, the Roland H. & Macy Paton Meyer Science and Mathematics Building, and the James B. Branton Chapel. Renovations were also made to the Cor Jesu building, second-floor resource center, Library, Benson Mall, and Food Services.

=== Thomas F. and Elaine P. Ridgley Fine Arts and Athletic Center ===
In January 1999, over 400 alumni, Brothers and friends attended the dedication ceremony for the Thomas F. and Elaine P. Ridgley Fine Arts and Athletic Center. The dedication of this 40,000-square-foot (3,700 m^{2}) facility was presided over by Bishop Gregory Aymond, CJ’67, hosted by Brother Ivy LeBlanc, S.C. President of Brother Martin High School and was the realization of the goal of the first phase of the Campaign for Brother Martin High School. The entrance to the Ridgley Center Lobby is on a diagonal. The diagonal sits on the Faubourg-Darcantel line, one of the oldest boundaries in the city. Upstairs in the second floor lobby, a wall of windows frame E.A. Farley Field.

=== E. A. Farley Field ===
Between 1945 and 1947 the Brothers of the Sacred Heart, looking toward the future had purchased more than 7 acres (28,000 m^{2}) of property, primarily from the Farley family, in the growing residential area of Gentilly. By 1952 Brother Martin Hernandez as provincial planned and supervised the construction of Cor Jesu High School on the Gentilly site. Through his Youth Progress Program Archbishop Joseph Francis Rummel contributed $475,000 toward construction and furnishings of the new school.

From 1980 through 1983 the school purchased parcels of land from the Farley Family which was bordered by Mandeville Street, Gentilly Boulevard, St. Aloysius Drive (formerly Stephen Girard St.) and Cor Jesu Drive (formerly Marigny St.) for use in their athletic and extracurricular programs.

The field underwent a renovation as part of Phase II of the Capital Campaign during which a baseball field was constructed and additional athletic storage and restrooms were added. The playing surface was redone and drainage and a sprinkler system were installed, allowing the lower level teams to play home games on campus, although the varsity plays its home games at Kirsch-Rooney Stadium at nearby Delgado Community College. This is especially where the football team practices. And also the baseball teams.

=== Roland H. & Macy Paton Meyer Science and Mathematics Building ===
The Roland H. & Macy Paton Meyer Science and Mathematics Building opened for the 2007–2008 school year on August 17. The Meyer Building is located at the corner of Elysian Fields Avenue and Sumpter Street, the former site of the Brothers’ Residence (circa 1955). This 35,000-square-foot (3,300 m^{2}) building houses computer, chemistry, physics and biology labs. For flexibility, eight science classrooms adjoin the three state-of-the-art lab spaces on the second floor. The first floor has seven math classrooms and a computer lab.

=== The James B. Branton Chapel ===
The James B. Branton chapel is settled in front of the Roland H. & Macy Paton Meyer Science and Mathematics Building. The chapel was built in honor of its namesake, James Bryan Branton, a student from the Class of 1974. He suddenly died on April 5, 1974, and was awarded his diploma posthumously.

== Academics ==
Brother Martin High School is fully accredited by the Southern Association of Colleges and Schools. The school offers college-preparatory classes to young men in grades 8–12.

== School organization and administration ==
The official governing body of Brother Martin High School is the school's board of directors, which is responsible for setting school policy and regulations and hiring the school president and principal. The administration of Brother Martin is a president, the principal, dean of students, assistant principal for academics, assistant principal for admissions, and assistant principal for student services.

== School mascot and colors ==
The school's mascot is a crusader and the colors are crimson and gold.

== Athletics ==
Brother Martin is a member of the Louisiana High School Athletic Association and participates in District 9-5A, also known as the Catholic League.

Brother Martin athletics began in the early 1900s with basketball and baseball. The school's years of athletic traditions have yielded numerous state and district championships. Brother Martin sponsors teams in baseball, basketball, bowling, cross country, football, golf, soccer, swimming, tennis, track and wrestling- which is regarded as one of the best high school wrestling programs in Louisiana with multiple state championship titles since 1979.

All teams except tennis, swimming, golf, wrestling, and bowling consist of four levels of competition: eighth grade, ninth grade, junior varsity and varsity.

=== Championships ===
==== Baseball ====
The 1983 American Legion baseball team sponsored by Brother Martin won the Louisiana state championship and Mid-South regional and placed fourth at the American Legion World Series.

==== Basketball ====
Brother Martin's basketball teams won state championships in three of its first five seasons following the merger of St. Aloysius and Cor Jesu. The 1969–70 team went 36–0 and was named a mythical national champion. In 1974, the Crusaders defeated the Catholic League rival Holy Cross in the championship game, led by the future University of Kentucky and NBA player Rick Robey.

==== Wrestling ====
In the sport of wrestling the school holds state records for the most state finalists in a single year (12 in 2000) and the most individual state champions in a single year (7 in both 2000 and 2001). It is also the only program in the state to have three individuals win four individual state titles in Division I: Richie Clementi (2025), Steven Shields (2017), and Paul Klein (2015).

=== Coaches ===
==== Football ====
The Crusader football team was coached for 27 seasons (1970–96) by Bobby Conlin, who compiled a 204–99–5 record, the most wins for any Catholic League coach, and the most for any New Orleans-area coach in Louisiana's highest classification. He led Brother Martin to the 1971 Class AAAA state championship with a 23–0 victory over archrival St. Augustine. The Crusaders also reached the championship game in 1989, losing 35–7 to Ouachita Parish. Conlin was posthumously inducted into the LHSAA Hall of Fame in 2003.

== Extracurricular activities ==
Some extracurricular activities offered include Academic Games, art and design club, book club, Bands- Marching, Concert, and Symphonic Bands, a pep and stage band, cheerleading, chorus, CSPN (Crusader Streaming & Programming Network), Culinary Crusaders, Close-Up, cyber patriot, drama club, Excalibur National Honor Society, fishing club, intramurals, Key Club, lacrosse, a literary magazine (The Pen and the Sword), literary rally, martial arts medical support staff, Mu Alpha Theta, National Honor Society, National Junior Honor Society, NJROTC, quiz bowl team, rugby team, speech and debate club, student ambassadors, student ministry, student recruiting team, student council, tabletop gaming club, ultimate frisbee, world culture club, and yearbook (Yesterday).

== Notable alumni ==
NOTE: Some of those listed below graduated from one of Brother Martin's forerunner schools, St. Aloysius (1869–1969) and Cor Jesu (1954–69)

- D. J. Augustin — basketball player for the Orlando Magic, former University of Texas point guard, and 9th overall pick in the 2008 NBA draft
- Gregory Aymond — current Archbishop of New Orleans
- Kevin Belton — celebrity TV chef on PBS, author and New Orleans cooking instructor. Played football at Brother Martin, LSU and the San Diego Chargers training camp.
- Tom Benson — owner of the New Orleans Saints & New Orleans Pelicans (died 2018)
- Zeke Bonura — former MLB player (Chicago White Sox, Washington Senators, New York Giants, Chicago Cubs)
- Ken Bordelon — former NFL linebacker (New Orleans Saints); co-captain of Brother Martin's 1971 Class AAAA state championship team
- Richard Brennan Sr. (1931–2015) — New Orleans restaurateur, owned the Commander's Palace
- Pascal F. Calogero Jr. — Chief Justice, Louisiana Supreme Court (retired)
- Garret Chachere — college football coach
- Philip Ciaccio — state representative, New Orleans City Council member, state circuit judge from 1982 to 1998
- Fernando del Valle (born Brian Stephen Skinner) — operatic tenor
- Allen J. Ellender — United States Senator, was President Pro Tempore of the United States Senate as well as Dean of the Senate
- Greer Grimsley — Bass-Baritone
- Juan LaFonta — Louisiana State Representative, District 96
- Warde Manuel — Athletic Director, University of Michigan. Former defensive tackle for the Wolverines football team. Is a member of the College Football Playoff Selection Committee.
- Chito Martínez — former MLB player (Baltimore Orioles)
- Paul Meany — lead singer of band Mutemath
- Stanton Moore — drummer of New Orleans band Galactic
- Robert William Muench — Bishop of the Diocese of Baton Rouge
- Don Newman — member of Brother Martin's 1974 state basketball champion team; NBA assistant coach, including World Champion San Antonio Spurs in 2005 & 2007
- Arthur J. O'Keefe — former mayor of New Orleans (1926–1929)
- Michael D. Perry, software engineer, photographer and writer
- Rick Robey — basketball player, member of Brother Martin's 1974 state champions, 1978 NCAA champion Kentucky Wildcats and 1981 NBA Champion Boston Celtics
- Edward Scheidt — retired Chairman of the CIA Cryptographic Center
- Richard Simmons — fitness guru and celebrity
- Eric F. Skrmetta — Commissioner, Louisiana Public Service Commission
- Irv Smith Jr. — NFL tight end
- Will Clapp — NFL offensive lineman and NFL coach
- Tre' Morgan — current minor league baseball player and former 2023 National Champion for the LSU Tigers
