= St. Mary's Dominican High School =

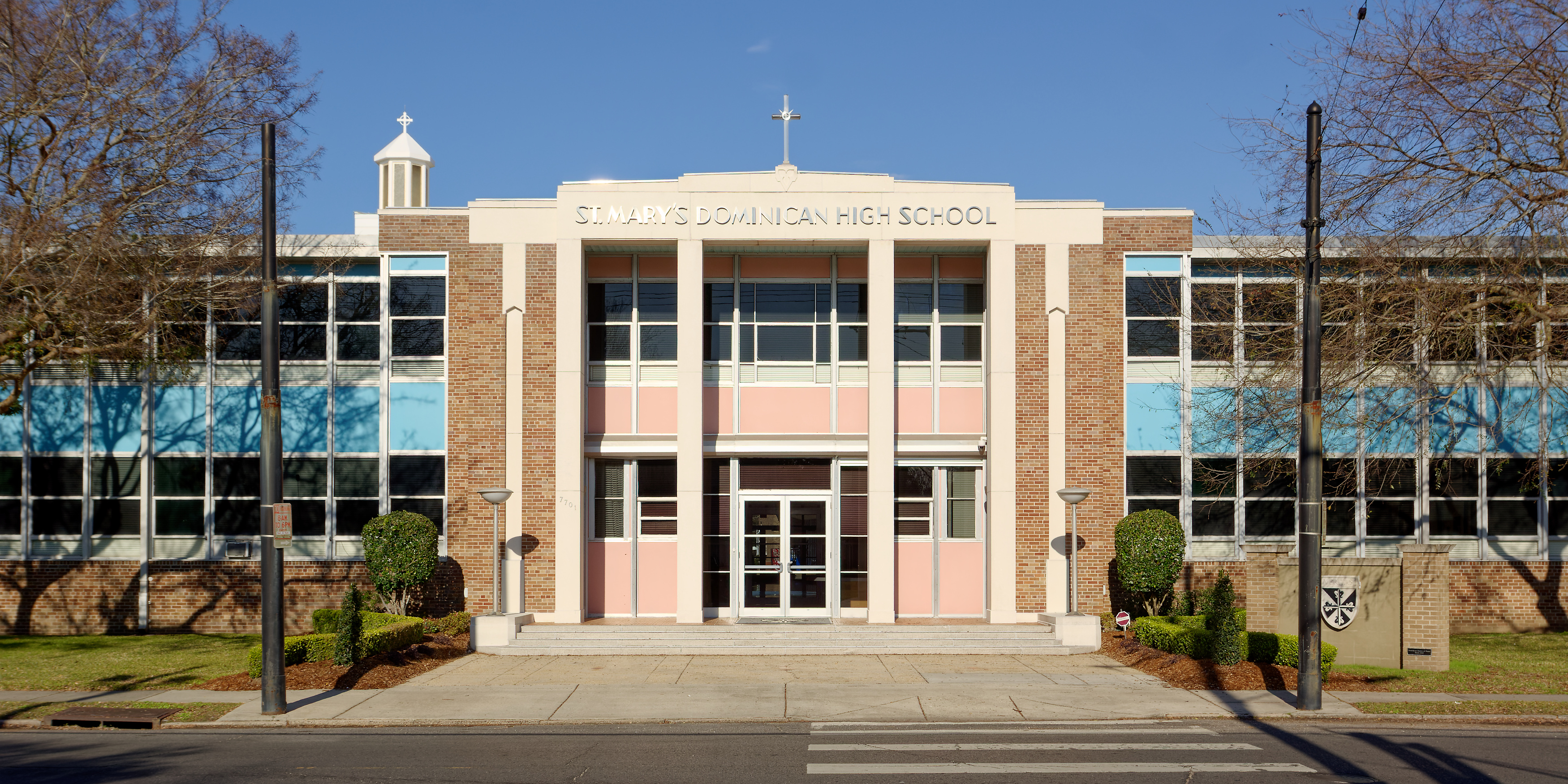
- St. Mary's Dominican, main entrance, 2019

Location
- 7701 Walmsley Avenue; New Orleans, Louisiana 70125; United States; 29°57′24″N 90°6′51″W

Information
- Other name: Dominican High School
- Former names: St. John the Baptist School for Girls (1860–1861); New Orleans Female Dominican Academy (1861–1914)
- School type: Private Roman Catholic Non-profit All-girls Secondary education institution
- Motto: Veritas (Latin) Truth (English)
- Religious affiliations: Roman Catholic; (Dominican Sisters of Peace)
- Established: 1860; 166 years ago
- Authority: Archdiocese of New Orleans
- President: Cynthia Thomas
- Principal: Carolyn Favre
- Teaching staff: 57.8 (FTE) (2019–20)
- Grades: 8–12
- Gender: Girls
- Enrollment: 870 (2019–20)
- Student to teacher ratio: 15:1 (2019–20)
- Colors: Black and white
- Athletics conference: LHSAA
- Sports: Basketball; Volleyball; Softball; Soccer; Swimming; Tennis; Track & Field; Cross Country; Golf
- Nickname: None
- Rival: Mount Carmel Academy; Archbishop Chapelle High School
- Accreditation: Cognia
- Yearbook: Regina Rosarii
- School fees: none (2023-24)
- Tuition: $11,320 (2023-24)
- Affiliation: National Catholic Educational Association
- Website: www.stmarysdominican.org

St. Mary's Dominican High School, or simply Dominican High School, is an all-girls private Catholic high school in New Orleans, Louisiana, sponsored by the Dominican Sisters of Peace.

Dominican is one of the few schools in Louisiana without a mascot. The school colors are black and white. The school's motto is Veritas (the Latin word for Truth).

The St. Mary's Dominican Band is one of the few all-girl marching bands in New Orleans. The Band performs at athletic games, Mardi Gras parades, festivals, and other school events.

== History ==
Dominican's life began in Louisiana with the arrival of seven Dominican sisters from St. Mary's Convent-Cabra, Dublin, Ireland, on November 5, 1860. The foundresses of St. Mary's Congregation in New Orleans, Mother Mary John Flanagan, Mother Mary Magdalene O'Farrell, Sister Mary Hyacinth McQuillan, Sister Mary Brigid Smith, Sister Mary Osanna Cahill, Sister Mary Xavier Gaynor, and Sister Mary Ursula O'Reilly, came at the request of Rev. Jeremiah Moynihan, Pastor of St. John the Baptist Church in New Orleans, to teach the children of the Irish immigrants. These Dominican women, educated in the humanities and the fine arts, opened St. John the Baptist School for Girls on December 3, 1860, with a recorded attendance of 200.

By 1861, the New Orleans Female Dominican Academy was chartered under Louisiana State laws as an "Institute for literary, scientific, religious, and charitable purposes." Three years later in October 1864, the Dominican Sisters bought at auction the Mace Academy in Greenville. On April 17, 1865, while some day students remained at the Academy on Dryades St., the boarding students were transferred to the Academy in Greenville. The early curriculum stressed the humanities and the fine arts.

In 1881, permission was received from the Archbishop to build a new academy on the property at Greenville; the cornerstone was laid in 1882. Later the suburban village of Greenville was incorporated into the City of New Orleans.

In 1900, Mother Mary de Ricci, assistant to the Prioress, called a preliminary meeting of all former pupils of Dominican Academy for the purpose of establishing an Alumnae Association. In January 1901, there was a well-organized association that selected St. Catherine of Siena as its Patroness.

Until 1914, there were two New Orleans Dominican Female Academies, one on Dryades Street and the other on St. Charles Avenue. In 1914, the Dryades program merged with the St. Charles Avenue campus program and changed its name to St. Mary's Dominican High School. In September 1927, St. Mary's Dominican High School was accredited by the Southern Association of Colleges and Schools. In 1993, an eighth grade five-year program of studies was established.

St. Mary's Dominican High School and St. Mary's Dominican College were located on the same premises at 7214 St. Charles Avenue. Increased enrollment in both the high school and the college necessitated physical expansion. Plans were made to construct a new Dominican High School on Walmsley Avenue. On March 22, 1963, Dominican High School made its move from 7214 St. Charles Avenue to 7701 Walmsley Avenue, its present site.

In 1989, Dominican was recognized as a School of Excellence by the United States Department of Education. The O'Farrell Student Complex was completed in 1993. In 1996, Dominican was recognized again by the United States Department of Education and was selected as a National Blue Ribbon School. In 1997 the Erminia Wadsworth Library was completed, and another phase of technological advancement was begun. The Siena Multipurpose Activity Center was completed in 2006. In 2016, the Tom Benson Technology Complex was completed, along with the renovation of several science classrooms and labs.

According to Niche.com, the school received 4th place (of 10 schools) for best all-girls school in the New Orleans area. The website also listed the school as ranked 18th (of 33 schools) for best STEM academics.

== Athletics ==
St. Mary's Dominican High athletics competes in the LHSAA.

== Notable alumnae ==
- Amy Coney Barrett (Class of 1990), Associate Justice of the Supreme Court of the United States
- Stephanie Hilferty, member of the Louisiana House of Representatives
- Lisa P. Jackson, EPA administrator 2009–2013.
- Arthel Neville, journalist
- Sheba Turk, journalist
- Cleo Wade, poet
