= Cleo Wade =

American poet

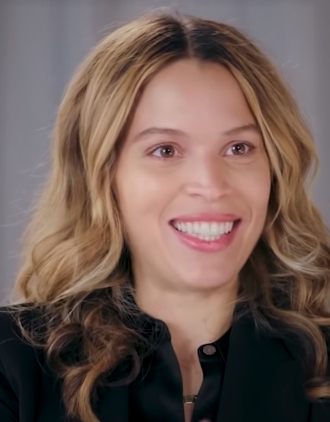
- Wade during an interview in 2020
- Born: September 13, 1989 (age 37); New Orleans, Louisiana, U.S.
- Occupations: Model, author, poet, artist
- Years active: 2014–present
- Partner: Simon Kinberg (engaged)
- Children: 2

Cleo Wade (born September 13, 1989) is an American artist, poet, activist, and author.

== Early life ==
Wade grew up in the French Quarter of New Orleans, Louisiana, to a white mother, Lori Rockett, and black father, Bernardo Wade. At age 6, she "fell in love with writing" after taking a poetry course over the summer. She attended St. Mary's Dominican High School.

After graduating from high school, she decided to pursue fashion and moved to New York City to intern at Missoni. While in the city, she consulted for Alice + Olivia, modeled for Cartier and Armani, and worked as an office manager at Halston.

Looking back on this period of her life, Wade reflects: "I was making money for the first time in my life, but I realized I wasn't happy. Nobody tells you what to do when your girlhood dreams bump into your womanhood dreams." She decided to travel the world and soon fell back into painting and poetry.

== Career ==
Cleo has been featured in Harper's Bazaar, Elle, People magazine, New York Magazine, The New York Times, Purple.fr, Teen Vogue, Untitled-magazine, V magazine, Vogue, Vogue Italia, and W Magazine, among other publications and websites.

=== Poetry ===
Wade's poetry centers around inspiration, affirmations, activism, and female empowerment. After over 2,300 Instagram posts and 782,000 followers later, Wade's work and activism have been widely shared and praised. In January 2018, The New York Times published a poem of hers in its opinion section entitled "How Are You Showing Up This Year", urging Americans to increase their political engagement, while Teen Vogue published her piece entitled "If I Could Write One Million Love Poems (A Love Letter To Trans Kids)" as a response to actions from the Trump administration. Wade has been published in W Magazine on several occasions, including "Who Are We Right Now", a poem dedicated to many famous women whom she admires, "An Open Letter to My Dearest America", a poem responding to the 2016 election, and "How I Became Woke to Politics", an article she wrote about her relationship to politics.

=== Public art installations ===
Wade has created several large-scale public art installations across North America, all with the underlying theme that "art should be in the name of all people and should serve all people." These projects include works in New Orleans: "Respect", a love poem extending 25 feet in the New Orleans French Quarter skyline and "She", a permanent installment on a 50-foot warehouse building, completed in collaboration with graffiti artist Brandon Odums, in the New Orleans Bywater neighborhood. In summer 2017, Wade created "ARE YOU OK" at the Hester Street Fair in New York City, which was "a public booth for free, peaceful, and loving conversation." In Los Angeles, she created "Show Love Spread Love" on the facade of the Beverly Center, which features 10-word mantras on 46-foot screens. Her art installations has also been in Times Square and Toronto.

=== Speaking engagements ===
In 2017, Wade gave a TED talk entitled "Want to change the world? Start by being brave enough to care", which has garnered over 1.5 million views on TED's website.

=== Books ===
In 2018, she published her first book, Heart Talk: Poetic Wisdom for a Better Life.

In 2019, she published her second book, Where to Begin: A Small Book About Your Power to Create Big Change in Our Crazy World.

In 2020, Heart Talk: The Journal, 52 weeks of self-love, self-care, and self-discovery

In 2021, What the Road Said

== Personal life ==
Wade is engaged to Simon Kinberg. They have two daughters; born in 2020 and 2021.

== Activist and nonprofit work ==
As of April 2018, She currently resides in Manhattan, where she serves on the boards of the Women's Prison Association, Lower East Side Girls Club (LESGC), and the National Black Theatre in Harlem.

Wade serves on the creative council for EMILY's List, an organization that supports and advocates for pro-choice Democratic women running for office. She frequently uses her Instagram prestige to advocate for several social movements, political issues, and activist campaigns. Wade is a Planned Parenthood supporter and posted shots from fundraising dinners or her work as a canvasser nearly the same amount as her regular posts of poems. She is also on the advisory board of Gucci's Chime for Change.

== Awards ==
Wade was a finalist in Literature at the 10th annual Shorty Awards. Fast Company honored Wade on their 2017 list of Most Creative People in Business. New York has named her "the Millennial Oprah."

== Bibliography ==
- Wade, Cleo (2018). Heart Talk: Poetic Wisdom for a Better Life. Simon & Schuster. ISBN 9781501177347.
