= Archbishop Rummel High School =

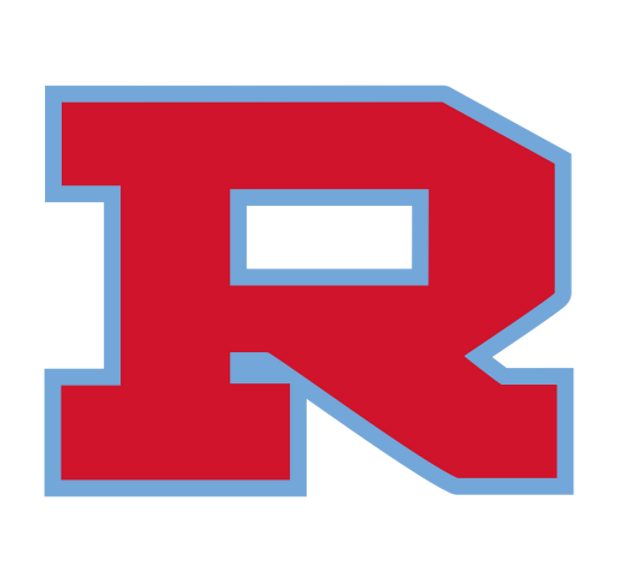

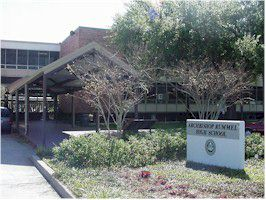

Location
- 1901 Severn Avenue; Metairie, Louisiana 70001; United States; 29°59′24″N 90°9′34″W

Information
- Type: Private
- Motto: Animam pro ovibus ponere. (To give one's life for the sheep.)
- Religious affiliation: Catholic
- Opened: September 10, 1962
- Founder: Archbishop Joseph Francis Rummel
- Sister school: Archbishop Chapelle High School
- School district: New Orleans Catholic League
- Oversight: Archdiocese of New Orleans
- Head of school: Matt Caire
- Chaplain: Fr. Kurt Young; Fr. Andrew Gutierrez
- Grades: 8–12
- Gender: All-male
- Average class size: 20
- Student to teacher ratio: 12:1
- Colors: Red, white, and Columbia blue
- Fight song: Roar, Rummel Raiders
- Athletics: Louisiana High School Athletic Association
- Athletics conference: New Orleans Catholic League (District 9-5A)
- Mascot: Rufus Raider
- Nickname: Super Ants
- Team name: Raiders
- Rival: Archbishop Shaw Eagles; Jesuit Blue Jays
- Accreditation: Southern Association of Colleges and Schools
- Publication: Rummel Review (literary magazine)
- Newspaper: Raiders' Digest
- Yearbook: The Raider
- School fees: $1,550 (2023–24)
- Tuition: $10,150 (2023–24)
- Affiliation: Institute of the Brothers of the Christian Schools (1962-1993)(2009-2024)
- Website: www.rummelraiders.com

Archbishop Rummel High School is a Catholic secondary school for boys located in Metairie, a community in unincorporated Jefferson Parish, Louisiana. The school is named after Archbishop Joseph Rummel, a former Archbishop in the Archdiocese of New Orleans.

== History ==
Opened on September 10, 1962, Archbishop Rummel High School was one of four archdiocesan Catholic high schools established for students of Jefferson Parish, a New Orleans suburb, as a result of an archdiocesan campaign. On that first day of class, 225 freshmen formed the charter class of the school. In its second year, with the admission of nine freshman classes, the school had an enrolment of almost 600 students. Additional freshman classes were added each year until the 1965–66 school year when the school was a complete high school with 1,100 students. The charter class of 222 was graduated on May 27, 1966. The school operated as a four year high school until 1981 when the Archdiocese of New Orleans gave permission for the school to begin an eighth grade program for the 1982–83 academic year.

The senior high school plant occupies one third of the campus and consists of five separate buildings adjoined by covered walkways. The remaining portion of the campus is structure-free for athletic programs and future development. The senior high campus is divided into the faculty office wing, the administration-library wing, and the classroom wings completing a quadrangle in the center of which is the school chapel. A senior wing was added in 1966 to accommodate the first senior class. Additionally, in 1985 the school purchased the former Stuart Prep property adjacent to the school to use for a junior high campus.

The school cafeteria and gymnasium are located on the senior high campus. In memory of the Nelson-Smyth family of Chicago, the gymnasium was dedicated in May 1963. A building program that saw the construction of the senior wing also included the music building, an athletic field house, and an addition to the faculty office wing. During the 1980–81 school year, the school enclosed the area under the senior wing to make a student mall and also added a weight room to the field house.

The Brothers of the Christian Schools (Christian Brothers) conducted Archbishop Rummel High School through June 1993, when they relinquished governance to the Archdiocese of New Orleans. On September 16, 2009 Archbishop Rummel High School officially re-associated itself with the Brothers of the Christian Schools. In June 2024, incoming Head of School Matt Caire disassociated Archbishop Rummel High School from the Christian Brothers, ending an association since the school's founding in 1962.

== Academics ==
The Program of Studies at Archbishop Rummel High School complies with or exceeds the requirements of the Louisiana State Board of Education, the Louisiana Tuition Opportunity Program for Students (TOPS), the Southern Association of Colleges and Schools (SACS), and the general entrance requirements of universities and colleges. The Louisiana State Board of Education, the Office of Catholic Schools of the Archdiocese of New Orleans, and the Archbishop Rummel Curriculum Committee, have approved these requirements.

The primary purpose of a Catholic high school like Archbishop Rummel is the faith development of its students.

== Pre-professional programs ==
Through the engineering, biomedical sciences, and law pre-professional programs at Archbishop Rummel High School, students learn both in the classroom and inside real world environments such as medical centers, engineering offices, and courtrooms. Through community partnerships, students learn from some of the metro area's top professionals in these industries.

== Dual enrollment ==
In cooperation with Southeastern Louisiana University, students complete college-level courses taught by the school's teachers on its campus, in partnership with Southeastern Louisiana University professors.

The students earn both high school and college credit that goes on transcripts of the school and the university. The credit is transferable to all public universities and colleges in Louisiana, and to many other colleges nationwide. The college credit counts towards the student's eventual college grade point average.

== Athletics ==
Archbishop Rummel competes in the LHSAA.

Sports offered by the school are baseball, basketball, bowling, cheerleading, cross country, football, golf, powerlifting, soccer, swimming, tennis, track and field, ultimate frisbee, and wrestling.

=== Championships ===
Football championships

- (3) State championships: 2012, 2013, 2019

Basketball championships

- (2) State championships: 1977, 1978

== Notable alumni ==
- Jim Bullinger – Former professional baseball player (Chicago Cubs, Montreal Expos, Seattle Mariners)
- Kirk Bullinger – Former professional baseball player (Montreal Expos, Boston Red Sox, Philadelphia Phillies, Houston Astros); head baseball coach at Archbishop Shaw High School in Marrero, Louisiana
- Cethan Carter '13 – American football player
- Ja'Marr Chase '18 - 5th overall pick in 2021 NFL draft, wide receiver for the Cincinnati Bengals, 2019 Fred Biletnikoff Award winner
- Thomas Diamond – Former professional baseball player (Chicago Cubs) #10 player selected in the MLB draft
- Logan Diggs - '21 - college football player
- Steven Dunbar – CFL football player
- Kristian Fulton '16 – 2nd round pick (61st overall) in 2020 NFL draft to Titans
- Cyril Grayson '12 – Former member of the Tampa Bay Buccaneers football team and Super Bowl Champion.
- Eddie Jemison – Actor, director, best known for roles in the Ocean's Trilogy and the HBO series Hung
- Omar Khan – General Manager (Pittsburgh Steelers)
- Troy Kropog '04 – Offensive lineman (New York Giants, (Tennessee Titans, Minnesota Vikings)
- Brian Palermo – Character actor, science communicator, and comedian
- Steve Scalise '83 – U.S. Representative from Louisiana; former member of the Louisiana House of Representatives and the Louisiana State Senate
- Ashton Stamps '23 – college football player
- Craig Steltz '04 – LSU 2007 All American, 2007 LSU Football Captain. Chicago Bears safety
