= Simon Kinberg =

British and American screenwriter (born 1973)

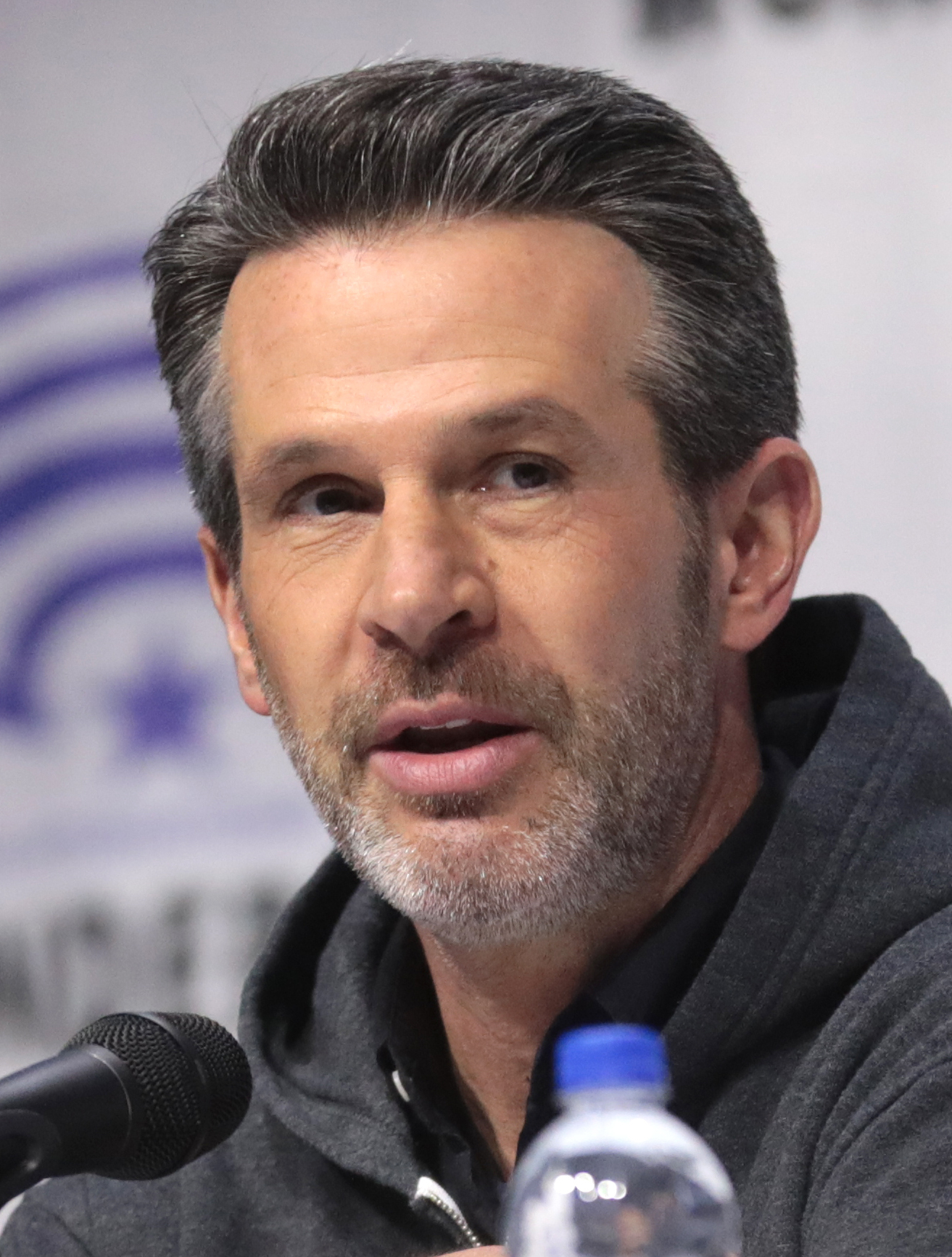
- Kinberg in 2019
- Born: Simon David Kinberg; August 2, 1973 (age 53); London, England
- Citizenship: United Kingdom; United States
- Education: Brown University (BA); Columbia University (MFA)
- Occupations: Film director; producer; screenwriter
- Years active: 2000–present
- Organization: Genre Films
- Spouse: Mali Heled (m. 2001; div. 2017)
- Partner: Cleo Wade (engaged)
- Children: 4
- Father: Jud Kinberg

Simon David Kinberg (born August 2, 1973) is a British and American screenwriter and filmmaker. He has written and produced a number of films for 20th Century Fox, including several films in the X-Men film franchise and The Martian, which earned him an Academy Award nomination for Best Picture. He made his directorial debut with the X-Men film Dark Phoenix (2019), which he also wrote.

== Early life ==
Kinberg was born in Hammersmith, London, England to American parents Monica Menell-Kinberg and Jud Kinberg, a New York City-born writer and producer. From age six, he was raised in Los Angeles, California. He is Jewish. Kinberg graduated from Brentwood School, and then from Brown University, Phi Beta Kappa, magna cum laude; in 2003 he received his MFA from Columbia University School of the Arts, where he won the Zaki Gordon Fellowship for Screenwriting.

== Career ==
While still in film school, Kinberg sold a pitch to Warner Bros., then went on to write scripts for Disney, Sony, and DreamWorks, working with Steven Spielberg and Jerry Bruckheimer, among others. After finishing school, Kinberg moved to Hollywood, where his first screenwriting credit was a sequel to the hit action film XXX (2002), XXX: State of the Union (2005). His next screenwriting venture was Mr. & Mrs. Smith, directed by Doug Liman and starring Brad Pitt and Angelina Jolie. The script began as Kinberg's thesis project for film school. Kinberg also wrote the pilot episode for a television adaptation of Mr. & Mrs. Smith for ABC. He also has a cameo appearance in the movie, as the banker who converses with John Smith at the dinner party.

Kinberg's next screenwriting job was the third movie in the 20th Century Fox X-Men film series: X-Men: The Last Stand (2006), which he co-wrote with Zak Penn. Comic-book writer Chris Claremont, who wrote the Dark Phoenix storyline that served as the primary source material for the film, also wrote the novelization of the film and made Kinberg a character in the book.

Kinberg reunited with director Doug Liman for the film Jumper (2008). Kinberg wrote and produced the film, which stars Samuel L. Jackson, Hayden Christensen, and Diane Lane. The following year, Kinberg was writer of Sherlock Holmes, directed by Guy Ritchie, starring Robert Downey Jr. and Jude Law. In April 2010, his production company, Genre Films, signed a first-look deal with 20th Century Fox.

Kinberg was the producer of X-Men: First Class (2011), and both writer and producer of This Means War (2012). He was also co-screenwriter and an executive producer of the film Abraham Lincoln: Vampire Hunter in that same year. In 2013, Kinberg produced Elysium.

The following year, Kinberg was the writer and the producer of the film X-Men: Days of Future Past. That same year, he produced Let's Be Cops. In 2015, Kinberg produced the Neill Blomkamp film Chappie and the live-action version of Cinderella at Walt Disney Pictures. He also worked on Fantastic Four as writer and producer. His final film of the year was The Martian, directed by Ridley Scott.

He wrote and produced X-Men: Apocalypse, the next film in the X-Men franchise following X-Men: Days of Future Past. Kinberg produced 2016's Deadpool, 2017's Logan, 2018's Deadpool 2, 2019's Dark Phoenix (the latter of which also served as his directorial debut) and The New Mutants, all of which are X-Men spin-off films. He also produced Murder on the Orient Express, an adaptation of the Agatha Christie novel of the same name.

The Hollywood Reporter initially reported that Lawrence Kasdan, co-writer of The Empire Strikes Back and Return of the Jedi, and Kinberg would write and produce Episodes VIII and IX of the new Star Wars films. A week later the publication stated that Kasdan and Kinberg would be working on future Star Wars projects, but not necessarily on Episodes VIII and IX.

In television, he is an executive producer on ABC's Designated Survivor starring Kiefer Sutherland, Legion created by Noah Hawley for FX, and The Gifted on Fox. He executive produced the third revival of the science fiction anthology series, The Twilight Zone which premiered in 2019 on CBS All Access (now Paramount+).

In July 2019, it was announced that Kinberg and his production company Genre Films was leaving Fox after 20 years.

On November 7, 2024, it was announced that Kinberg has been hired by Lucasfilm to write and co-produce a new trilogy of Star Wars films along with Kathleen Kennedy.

== Personal life ==
Kinberg married Mali Heled in a Jewish ceremony on July 26, 2001. They have two sons. The couple separated in 2014, and subsequently divorced in 2017. By November 4, 2019, Kinberg became engaged to writer Cleo Wade. They have two daughters; born in 2020 and 2021.

== Filmography ==
=== Film ===
Year	Title	Writer	Producer	Director	Notes
2005	XXX: State of the Union	Yes	No	Lee Tamahori	
2005	Mr. & Mrs. Smith	Yes	No	Doug Liman	Role: Investment Banker #1
2006	X-Men: The Last Stand	Yes	No	Brett Ratner	
2008	Jumper	Yes	Yes	Doug Liman	
2009	Sherlock Holmes	Yes	No	Guy Ritchie	
2011	X-Men: First Class	No	Yes	Matthew Vaughn	
2012	This Means War	Yes	Yes	McG	
2013	Elysium	No	Yes	Neill Blomkamp	
2014	X-Men: Days of Future Past	Yes	Yes	Bryan Singer	
2014	Let's Be Cops	No	Yes	Luke Greenfield	
2015	Fantastic Four	Yes	Yes	Josh Trank	
2015	Cinderella	No	Yes	Kenneth Branagh	
2015	Chappie	No	Yes	Neill Blomkamp	
2015	The Martian	No	Yes	Ridley Scott	
2016	Deadpool	No	Yes	Tim Miller	
2016	X-Men: Apocalypse	Yes	Yes	Bryan Singer	
2017	Logan	No	Yes	James Mangold	
2017	Murder on the Orient Express	No	Yes	Kenneth Branagh	
2018	Deadpool 2	No	Yes	David Leitch	
2019	Dark Phoenix	Yes	Yes	Himself	Directorial debut
2020	The New Mutants	No	Yes	Josh Boone	
2022	The 355	Yes	Yes	Himself	
2023	A Haunting in Venice	No	Yes	Kenneth Branagh	
2024	Lift	No	Yes	F. Gary Gray	
2025	The Running Man	No	Yes	Edgar Wright	
2027	The Take	Yes	Yes	Fernando Meirelles	

Executive producer

- Abraham Lincoln: Vampire Hunter (2012)
- Death on the Nile (2022)
- Deadpool & Wolverine (2024)

Creative consultant

- Star Wars: The Force Awakens (2015)

Thanks credit

- Star Wars: The Force Awakens (2015)
- Rogue One (2016)

=== Television ===
Year	Title	Director	Writer	Executive producer	Creator	Notes
2014–2018	Star Wars Rebels	No	Yes	Yes	Yes	
2016–2019	Designated Survivor	No	No	Yes	No	
2017–2019	The Gifted	No	No	Yes	No	Part of the X-Men film franchise
2017–2019	Legion	No	No	Yes	No	Part of the X-Men film franchise
2019–2020	The Twilight Zone	Yes	Yes	Yes	Developer	Directed "Blurryman" and wrote "Nightmare at 30,000 Feet"
2021	Invasion	No	Yes	Yes	Yes	
2024	Sugar	No	No	Yes	No	
2026	Maximum Pleasure Guaranteed	No	No	Yes	No	

== Awards and nominations ==
He received a lifetime achievement award from the Saturn Awards in 2016.

He was named #61 on the list of 100 most powerful people in Hollywood by The Hollywood Reporter in 2016. The same year, The Hollywood Reporter named Kinberg as the highest-paid screenwriter in Hollywood with a record US$16 million for two X-Men scripts, and named him as one of the highest-paid producers in Hollywood with US$40 million for Deadpool in their annual Hollywood Salaries issue.

Year	Category	Award	Title	Result
2015	Golden Globe Awards	Best Motion Picture – Musical or Comedy	The Martian	Won
2015	Academy Awards	Best Picture	The Martian	Nominated
2015	Producers Guild of America Awards	Best Picture	The Martian	Nominated
2015	National Board of Review	Best Film	The Martian	Nominated
2015	Critics' Choice Movie Awards	Best Film	The Martian	Nominated
2016	Critics' Choice Movie Awards	Best Comedy	Deadpool	Won
2016	Golden Globe Awards	Best Motion Picture – Musical or Comedy	Deadpool	Nominated
2016	Producers Guild of America Awards	Best Picture	Deadpool	Nominated
2019	Golden Raspberry Award	Worst Prequel, Remake, Rip-off or Sequel	Dark Phoenix	Nominated
