= St. Augustine High School (New Orleans) =

High school in New Orleans, Louisiana

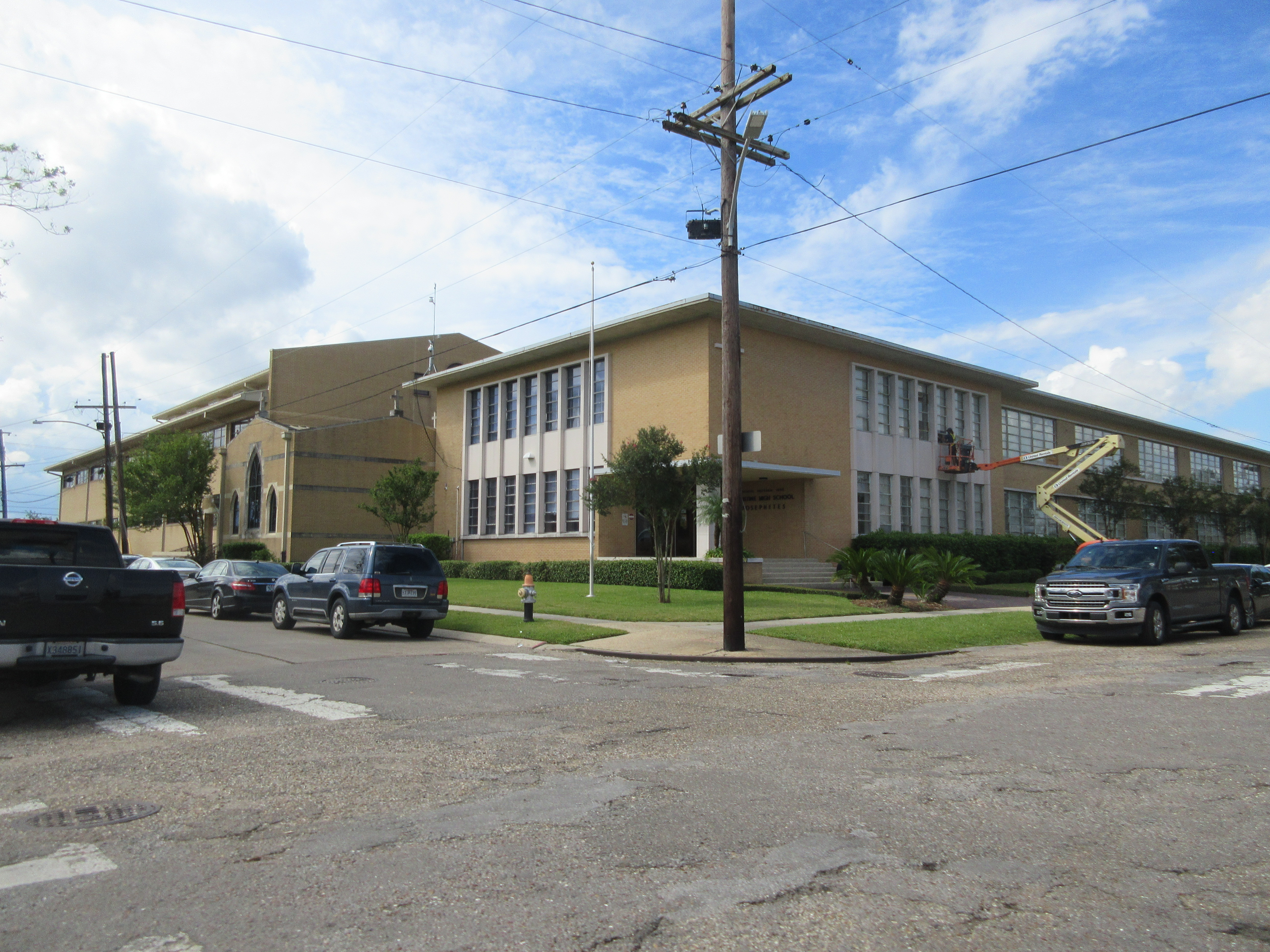
- school building in 2021

Location
- 2600 A.P. Tureaud Avenue; New Orleans, Louisiana 70119; United States; 29°59′1″N 90°4′6″W

Information
- Type: Private, College-prep
- Motto: Gratia est vita (Grace is life)
- Religious affiliations: Roman Catholic, Josephite Fathers and Brothers
- Patron saint: St. Augustine of Hippo
- Founded: 1951
- President: Aulston Taylor
- Dean: Darren Dixon
- Principal: Lasana Cambrice
- Chaplain: Rev. Howard Byrd, SSJ
- Grades: 8–12
- Gender: All-Boys
- Enrollment: 650 - 700
- Colors: Purple and Gold
- Athletics conference: New Orleans Catholic League (District 10-5A); Louisiana High School Athletic Association
- Mascot: Purple Knight
- Nickname: St. Aug.
- Team name: Purple Knights
- Rival: Brother Martin Crusaders; McDonogh 35 Roneagles
- Accreditation: Southern Association of Colleges and Schools
- Publication: The Purple Press
- Newspaper: The Knight
- Yearbook: The Josephite
- School fees: $825 (2023–24)
- Tuition: $9,975 (2023–24)
- Alumni: 7000+
- Admissions Director: Calvin Haynes
- Athletic Director: Ryan Sims
- Website: www.staugnola.org

St. Augustine High School (also known as "St. Aug") is a private, Catholic, all-boys high school run by the Josephites in New Orleans, Louisiana. It was founded in 1951 and includes grades 8 through 12.

== History ==
=== Origins ===
St. Augustine High School was built by the Archdiocese of New Orleans with funds given by Catholics of the Archdiocese through the Youth Progress Program. The building and site were bought by the Society of St. Joseph of the Sacred Heart (The Josephite Fathers and Brothers), to whom the operation of the school was entrusted. The Archdiocese of New Orleans placed the school under the patronage of St. Augustine of Hippo, a pre-eminent Christian and scholar of Africa, and a Father of the Church.

From its inception the school was intended for the education of young men from black Catholic families of New Orleans. In 1951, when education was segregated, schools in New Orleans open to black students were seen as generally poor.

=== Ethos ===
Respect for the students was seen as essential. The first principal wrote: "Calling the students 'mister' would help offset the negative impact of whites calling every black male 'boy' no matter what his age, his education, his standing in the community. Likewise, and for stronger reasons, the use of 'mister' would serve to negate the deleterious impact of the hateful use of the 'n' word."

Although St. Augustine now welcomes students of all races, it remains a leading secondary school for black young men in Louisiana, and has long been nationally recognized in educational circles for outstanding success in preparing its students for higher education. Time magazine wrote in 1965:

"The boys are better trained than most Southern high school students of either race," says Harold Owens of Andover, one of the half-dozen leading prep schools that have accepted St. Aug students for intensive summer courses. Adds Charles McCarthy, director of a cooperative effort by the Ivy League schools to spot bright, underprivileged students: "St. Augustine produces high-quality candidates who don't disappoint the colleges once they're admitted." Peter Briggs, a freshman admissions officer at Harvard, finds St. Aug boys "interesting, constructive guys."

St. Augustine High School led the way in battling segregation in New Orleans. The successful legal challenges mounted by the school (and lawyer A.P. Tureaud) resulted in the desegregation of high school athletics in Louisiana, so that by the end of the 1960s St Augustine teams could play against teams from white schools.

=== The "Marching 100" ===
The famed "Marching 100" was the first African-American high school band to march in the Rex parade on Mardi Gras Day, in 1967. The "Marching 100" also played for Pope John Paul II in 1987 and for eight U.S. Presidents. Additionally, the band has performed for five Super Bowls, the Macy's Thanksgiving Day Parade in New York City, and the 2002 Tournament of Roses Parade in Pasadena, California. The band was the subject of a 60 Minutes segment New Orleans' St. Augustine High School Marching Band, the self-proclaimed "Best Band in the Land" which first aired March 14, 2021, which (on the east coast) immediately preceded the live broadcast of the Grammy Awards, in which four St. Augustine alumni had been nominated.

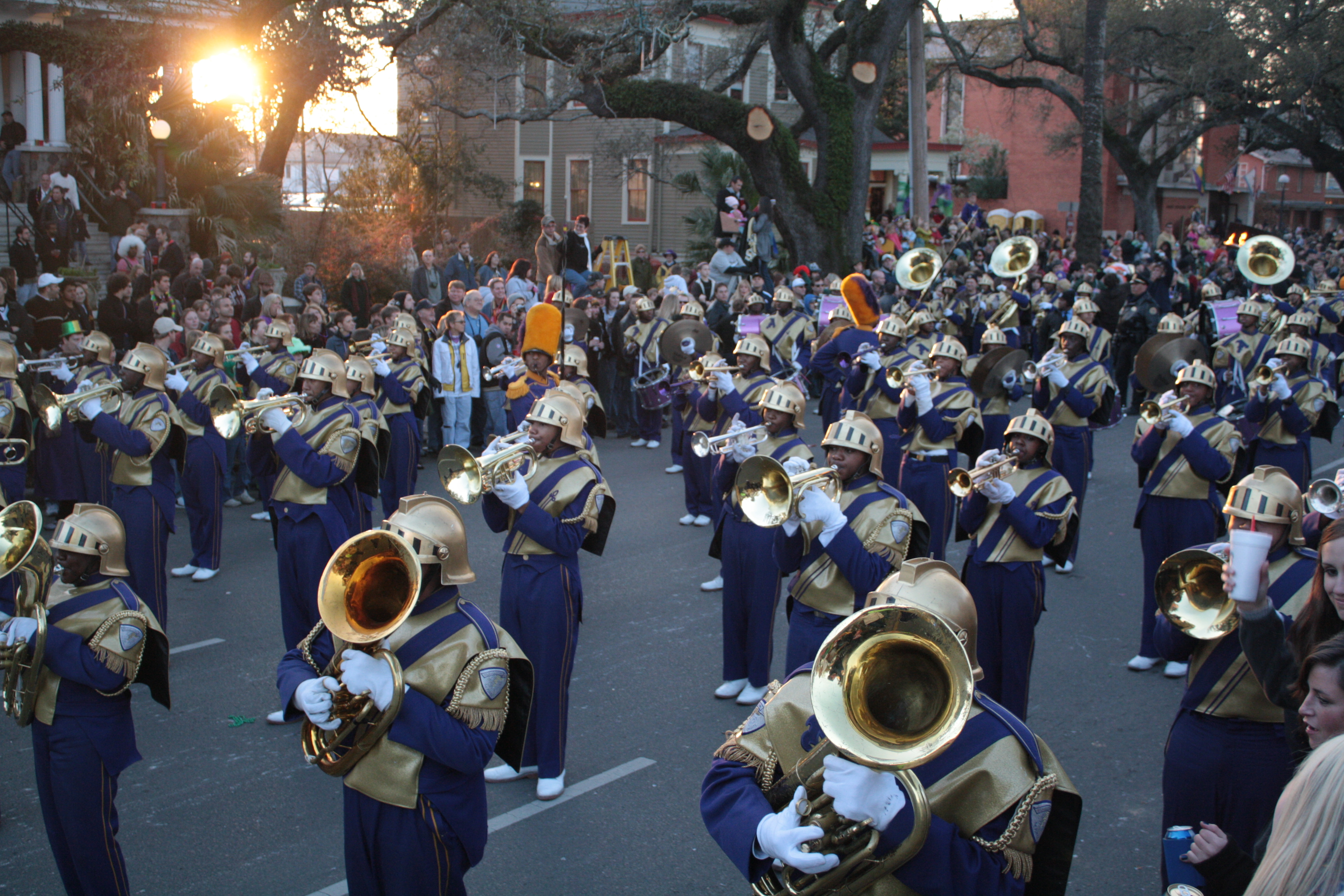
The "Marching 100" performing in the 2010 Endymion parade.

=== Upgrades ===
In 1971, the school added a wing to accommodate new science laboratories, a gymnasium and athletic complex, and a music complex. In 2005 the Warren and Hilda Donald Business and Technology Center was inaugurated. During the 2021–22 school year, the school renovated entire building and locker rooms.

=== Hurricane Katrina ===
In August 2005 Hurricane Katrina affected New Orleans. The school, including its recently built business and technology wing and its band room, received flood damage. Some areas, including the band room, had 5 feet (1.5 m) of water. The total of damages was in the millions of dollars. St. Augustine High School had to close its doors for the first time since its inception. The school had plans to re-open in August 2006. On a temporary basis the school planned to combine with two other Catholic schools to have a K-12 school in a facility that had not been flooded. In January 2006, the administrations of St. Mary's Academy, St. Augustine High School, and Xavier University Preparatory collaborated to establish the MAX School of New Orleans. This guaranteed the post-Katrina survival of the three historically African-American Roman Catholic High Schools in New Orleans.

The school was later rebuilt and brought back to operating status.

=== Reconfiguration ===
Prior to 2015, St. Augustine had grades 6–12. The archdiocese began requiring schools to fit one of three grade configurations (PK-7, 8–12, or PK-12) in order to continue affiliation, and St. Augustine needed to change its grade configuration. This was as per the archdiocese's 2013 strategic plan. The school leadership considered changing the grade configuration to K-12.

== Academics ==
St. Augustine says that its program of studies challenges each student to achieve his fullest individual potential. Various methodologies have been used throughout the history of the school to achieve this, from homogeneous groupings to diversified instruction methods. According to the school, its aim is to prepare students of all academic aptitudes to function successfully in their professional endeavors.

== Discipline and controversy ==
Throughout its history, St. Augustine has maintained a tradition of strong discipline, previously achieved in part through the use of corporal punishment. Time magazine reported in 1965 that "the atmosphere at St. Aug's is warm but strict. Misbehaving students are whacked with an oak paddle".

The school's founding principal, Fr Matthew O'Rourke, SSJ has said that the discipline instilled by what he called the "Board of Education" was important because learning could not go on without it. With it, students were so well-behaved that visitors to the campus were amazed.

Basketball star Hollis Price, who attended the school in the late 1990s, states that he got paddled for talking in class, "on the court, everywhere", and that his "aching backside" taught him the value of discipline.

The practice of corporal punishment was suspended at St. Augustine in 2011 on the orders of Archbishop Gregory Aymond, who claimed the practice was inconsistent with Catholic teachings. An Archdiocisean review conducted by Dr. Monica Applewhite, described as an expert in safe environment training and child protection, determined that "the school's corporal punishment was both excessive and unreasonable and the school did not have effective safeguards to prevent future abuse."

The archbishop's decision to abolish paddling created uproar at the school, among students and teachers as well as former students. On February 24, 2011, a four-hour "town hall" meeting was held in the school gymnasium, at which students and alumni mounted an "impassioned defense" of corporal punishment, stating that it had been valuable for them in teaching that there are consequences to actions. Parents and teachers also attended and opposed the ban.

At the meeting, the Principal said that since paddling stopped there had been an increase in bullying and detentions at the school. In response to a statement by the archbishop that no other Catholic schools in New Orleans now employed corporal discipline, District Court Judge Kern Reese, an alumnus of the school, said, "we are not everyone else. We don't care about everyone else. This (corporal punishment) works at St. Augustine".

On March 26, 2011, more than 500 students, parents and others marched on an archdiocese office to deliver a message in favor of paddling. President of the student body Jacob Washington said at the march that the archbishop was "trying to fix something that's not broken".

The school's president, Fr. John Raphael, SSJ objected to the archdiocese overruling the school's own board and said that the issue was about the rights of African-American parents to educate and discipline their children in their own traditions. Raphael would later depart the school, the city, and the Josephites after paddling was permanently banned.

== Athletics ==
St. Augustine's students and its sports teams are commonly referred to as the "Purple Knights", and its school colors are purple and gold. They are a class 5A team in the Catholic League of the LHSAA.

=== Athletic history ===
Prior to 1967, St. Augustine competed in the Louisiana Interscholastic Athletic and Literary Organization (L.I.A.L.O.). St. Augustine football won three state championships (1963, 1965, 1966) and one district championship in L.I.A.L.O.

=== Championships ===
==== LHSAA Outdoor Track and Field ====
2001: Class 5A Outdoor State Champions https://la.milesplit.com/meets/17092-lhsaa-state-outdoor-championships-2001/results/458974/raw

2001: Class 5A Indoor State Champions https://la.milesplit.com/meets/687-louisianna-state-indoor-finals-2001/results/1691/raw

2005: Class 5A Outdoor State Champions https://la.milesplit.com/meets/11444-lhsaa-state-outdoor-championships-2005/results/346600/raw

==== LHSAA basketball ====
- 1983: St. Augustine 61–Neville 60
- 1992: St. Augustine 67–John Ehret 50
- 1995: (USA Today National Champions)
  St. Augustine 57–Catholic (B.R.) 33
- 1999: St. Augustine 54–South Lafourche 48
- 2002: St.augustine 61 — Brother Martin 53
- 2011: St. Augustine 67–Scotlandville 43
- 2013 St.Augustine 68- Rummel 57 (Lhsaa Conflicts
- 2021: St. Augustine 47–Scotlandville 44

==== LHSAA football ====
- 1975
- 1978
- 1979

==== L.I.A.L.O. football ====
- 1963
- 1965
- 1966

Football championship history Head football coach Otis Washington was head coach for all three LHSAA football state championships at the school.

In the 1978 championship game, the first to be played in the Superdome, the Knights defeated Catholic League rival Jesuit 14–7 in front of a crowd of 42,000. This game led the LHSAA to move all championship games to the Superdome (now the Caesars Superdome) starting in 1981, where they remain to this day, save for moves to Shreveport in 2005 due to the damage the Superdome suffered during Hurricane Katrina, and to Natchitoches in 2020 due to the COVID-19 pandemic.

St. Augustine lost the 1971 championship game, its first championship game in any sport as an LHSAA member, to archrival Brother Martin 23–0 in front of more than 25,000 fans at Tad Gormley Stadium in New Orleans' City Park.

=== Coaches ===
==== Basketball ====
- Bernard Griffith - Louisiana basketball coaches hall of fame head basketball coach, Bernard Griffith, was head coach at St. Augustine from 1987 to 2004. During his eighteen seasons at the school, he compiled a record of 491–127 and won a USA Today national championship in 1995, and three state championships in 1992, 1995, and 1999 along with four runner-up finishes. During his tenure as St. Augustine head coach, he also led the team to thirteen district championships including eleven in a row with his teams playing in the New Orleans Catholic League. He was also an assistant coach on the 1983 state championship team.
  Griffith has an overall record of 694–204 (.772) as a high school head coach and spent three years as head coach at Sarah T. Reed High School. As a college head basketball coach, he was in charge of the Dillard University men's basketball program from 2011 to 2015. He has also been an assistant coach at Southern University–Baton Rouge, Xavier University of Louisiana, and Jesuit High School in New Orleans. Professionally, Griffith was an assistant coach for the Dallas Mavericks from 2005 to 2007. As an administrator, he served as athletic director at L.B. Landry High School, Sophie B. Wright Charter High School, and also Southern University–New Orleans from 2017 to 2020.

==== Football ====
- Otis Washington - LHSAA Hall of Fame head football coach, Otis Washington, was head coach at St. Augustine from 1969 to 1979. During his eleven seasons at the school, he compiled a 113–17–1 record and won three state championships in 1975, 1978, and 1979 and a state runner-up finish in 1971. During his tenure at the school, he also lead the team to eleven consecutive winning seasons and seven district championships with his teams playing in the New Orleans Catholic League. In 1980, Washington left to become the offensive line coach at LSU and from 1981 to 1986, he was head football coach for the Southern Jaguars football team finishing with a record of 35–30–1.

== In popular media ==
The story of the school's 1965 basketball team being the first to play in an integrated game in New Orleans is featured in the 1999 movie, Passing Glory.

== Notable alumni ==
- Louis Age, class of 1988, former NFL offensive tackle Chicago Bears
- Glenn Alexander, former NFL player for the Buffalo Bills
- Vernel Bagneris, playwright, actor, director, singer, and dancer
- Patrick Barry, class of 1997, MMA, UFC fighter
- Sidney Barthelemy, mayor of New Orleans, 1986–1994
- Dean Baquet, Executive Editor, The New York Times
- Jon Batiste, musician, Grammy winner
- Henry Braden, class of 1961, state senator and African Americans' rights activist
- Burton Burns, class of 1971, Assistant Head Football Coach, Alabama
- Earl Cager, NFL player for the New York Giants
- Selvish Capers, former NFL and CFL offensive guard
- Oliver Celestin, former NFL player for the New York Jets, Arizona Cardinals, Seattle Seahawks, and Kansas City Chiefs
- Sherman Copelin, member of the Louisiana House of Representatives for District 99 (Lower Ninth Ward), 1986-2000
- Caleb Daniels, professional basketball player
- Arnold W. Donald, CEO of Carnival Corporation & plc-2000
- Nat Dorsey, class of 2001, former NFL player for the Cleveland Browns
- Eugene Edgerson, former Harlem Globetrotter
- Jay Electronica rapper, Class of 1994, Roc Nation
- Leonard Fournette, class of 2014, NFL Running Back for the Jacksonville Jaguars, Tampa Bay Buccaneers
- BenJarvus Green-Ellis, former NFL running back for the New England Patriots
- James Hall, former NFL player for the Detroit Lions and St. Louis Rams
- Cortez Hankton, class of 1998, former NFL player for the Minnesota Vikings; Wide Receiver coach for Georgia, LSU
- Jimmy Harris, member of the Louisiana House of Representatives for District 99 since 2016
- Leroy Hoard, class of 1986, former NFL running back for the Cleveland Browns and Minnesota Vikings
- Tyrone Hughes, class of 1988, former NFL kick returner for the New Orleans Saints
- Paul Irons, former NFL player for the Cleveland Browns
- Luke James, Class of 2002, recording artist
- Al Jenkins, former NFL player for the Cleveland Browns
- Avery Johnson, class of 1983, Former NBA player and NBA coach
- Rishaw Johnson, former NFL player
- Charles Jones, NFL player for the Jacksonville Jaguars
- Jacoby Jones (football player) - In his third (junior) year, he transferred to Marion Abramson High School
- Kerry Kittles, former NBA player for the New Jersey Nets
- Doug Landry, professional football player
- Derrick Lewis, NFL and AFL player for the New Orleans VooDoo
- Mack Maine rapper, Class of 1998, Young Money
- Lonnie Marts, Class of 1985, former NFL player for the Tampa Bay Buccaneers
- Tyrann Mathieu, NFL player for the Kansas City Chiefs, New Orleans Saints
- Stanley Morgan Jr., NFL Player for the Cincinnati Bengals
- PJ Morton, Class of 1999, recording artist
- Harold Nash, strength and conditioning coach for the New England Patriots
- Louis Oubre, former NFL player for the New Orleans Saints, Philadelphia Eagles and Miami Dolphins
- Jaron Pierre Jr., basketball player
- Percy A. Pierre, mathematician
- Hollis Price, basketball player
- Jerry Reese, NFL player for the Kansas City Chiefs
- Derrick Rodgers, former NFL player for the Miami Dolphins
- Griffin P. Rodgers, Director, National Institute of Diabetes, Digestive and Kidney Diseases, NIH
- Donald Royal, class of 1983, former NBA player Orlando Magic
- Malcolm Scott, former NFL tight end
- Harold Sylvester, actor
- Raynoch Thompson, former NFL player for the Arizona Cardinals
- Trai Turner, NFL player for the Pittsburgh Steelers
- Patrick Trahan, former NFL player for the Chicago Bears
- Stan Verrett, sportscaster, ESPN
- Jackie Wallace, former NFL player for the Minnesota Vikings and St. Louis Rams
- Bryce Washington (born 1996), basketball player in the Israeli Basketball Premier League
- Carl Weathers, actor and former NFL player
- Frank Wilson, head football coach of McNeese State University
- Jason Wiltz (born 1976), former NFL player
