= Steven Dunbar =

American football player (born 1995)

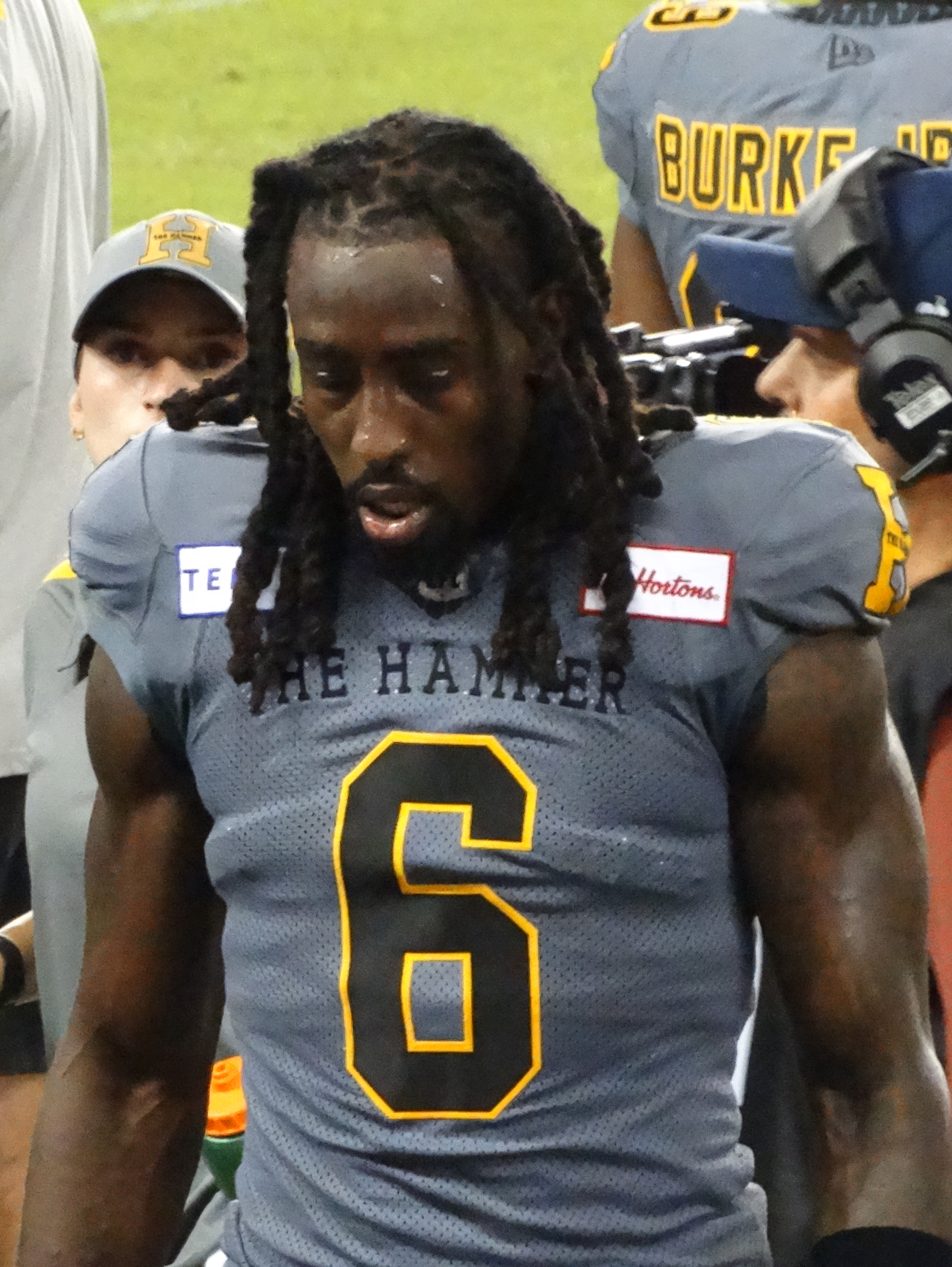
- Dunbar with the Hamilton Tiger-Cats in 2024

No. 19, 82, 8, 7, 89, 6
- Position: Wide receiver

Personal information
- Born: December 19, 1995 (age 30); New Orleans, Louisiana, U.S.
- Listed height: 6 ft 3 in (1.91 m)
- Listed weight: 202 lb (92 kg)

Career information
- High school: Archbishop Rummel (Metairie, Louisiana)
- College: Houston
- NFL draft: 2018: undrafted

Career history
- San Francisco 49ers (2018); Denver Broncos (2019)*; Dallas Renegades (2020); Hamilton Tiger-Cats (2020–2022); Edmonton Elks (2023); Houston Roughnecks (2024); Hamilton Tiger-Cats (2024); Edmonton Elks (2025)
- * Offseason or practice squad member only

Awards and highlights
- 2× CFL East All-Star (2022, 2024)

Career NFL statistics
- Games played: 1
- Stats at Pro Football Reference

Career CFL statistics
- Receptions: 274
- Targets: 425
- Receiving yards: 3,836
- Receiving touchdowns: 22
- Stats at CFL.ca

Steven Dunbar Jr. (born December 19, 1995) is an American former professional football player who was a wide receiver in the National Football League (NFL), Canadian Football League (CFL), and United Football League (UFL). He played college football for the Houston Cougars.

== College career ==
Dunbar started in 38 games for the Houston Cougars and finished his college career with 180 receptions for 2,430 yards and 11 touchdowns. As a senior in 2017, Dunbar earned honorable mention All-American Athletic Conference honors.

== Professional career ==
=== San Francisco 49ers ===
After being undrafted, the San Francisco 49ers signed Dunbar on May 1, 2018. On September 1, 2018, Dunbar was cut but re-signed with the 49ers' practice squad the next day. On December 26, 2018, Dunbar was promoted to the active roster. He was waived on April 29, 2019.

=== Denver Broncos ===
On July 18, 2019, Dunbar signed with the Denver Broncos. He was waived on August 31, 2019.

=== Dallas Renegades ===
In the 2020 XFL draft, Dunbar was selected in the open phase by the Dallas Renegades. He was placed on injured reserve on December 19, 2019. He was waived from injured reserve on March 23, 2020.

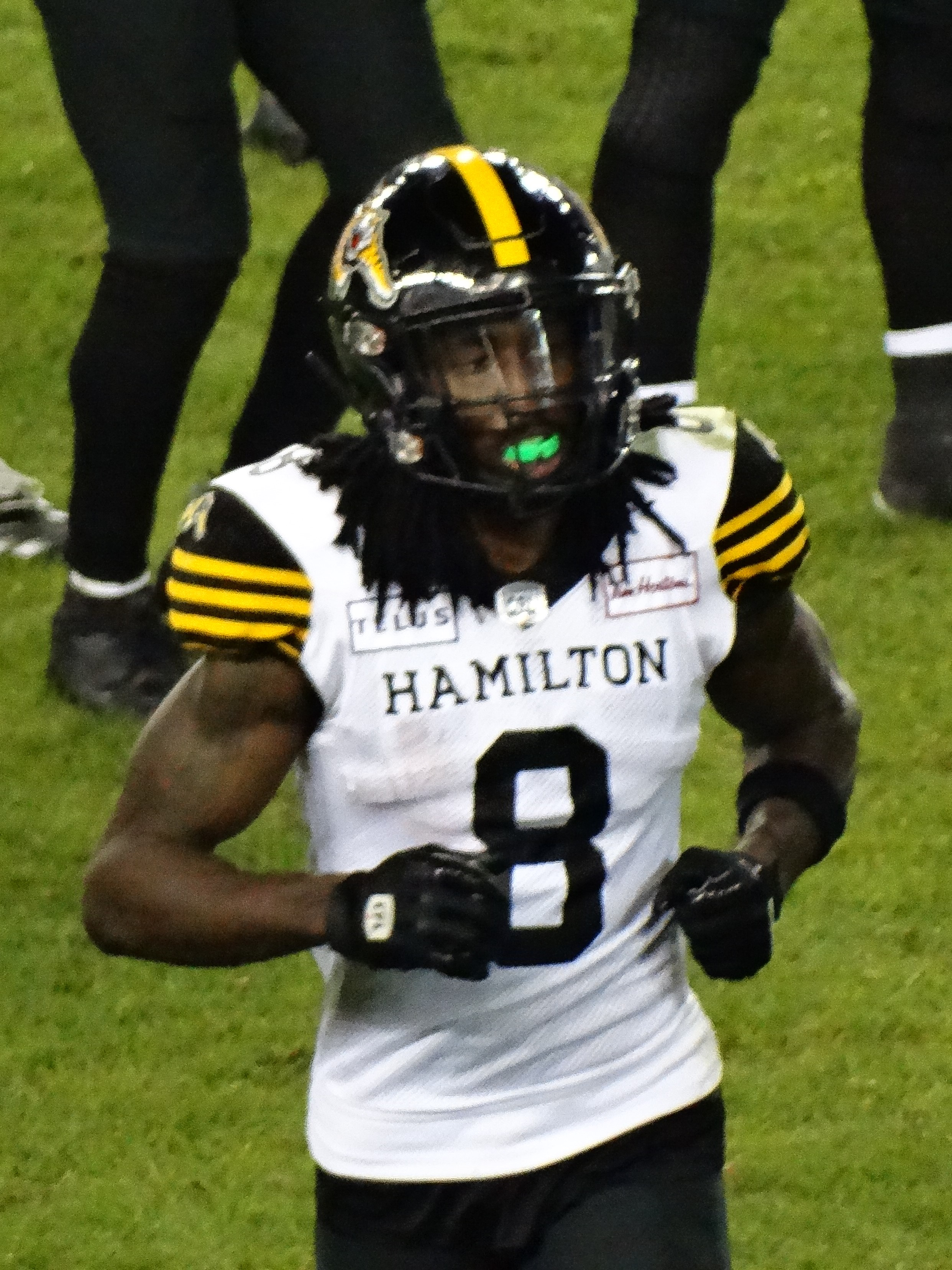
Dunbar with the Hamilton Tiger-Cats in 2022

=== Hamilton Tiger-Cats (first stint) ===
Dunbar signed with the Hamilton Tiger-Cats of the Canadian Football League on February 10, 2020. After the CFL canceled the 2020 season due to the COVID-19 pandemic, Dunbar chose to opt-out of his contract with the Tiger-Cats on August 31, 2020. He re-signed with the Tiger-Cats on December 2, 2020. Dunbar played 12 regular-season games for the Ticats in his first season in the CFL, catching 44 passes for 630 yards with four touchdowns. He was re-signed by Hamilton on January 30, 2022.

=== Edmonton Elks (first stint) ===
Dunbar joined the Edmonton Elks as a free agent on February 14, 2023. He played in 13 games in 2023 where he had 39 receptions for 536 yards and five touchdowns. In the following offseason, he was released on January 3, 2024.

=== Houston Roughnecks ===
On January 22, 2024, Dunbar signed with the Houston Roughnecks of the United Football League (UFL). He was released on April 15, 2024.

=== Hamilton Tiger-Cats (second stint) ===
On May 29, 2024, it was announced that Dunbar had signed with the Hamilton Tiger-Cats.

=== Edmonton Elks (second stint) ===
Dunbar joined the Elks through free agency on February 13, 2025. He announced his retirement on February 17, 2026.
