= Michael Perry (software engineer) =

American software engineer

Michael D. Perry, is a United States software engineer. He is the founder of InterCommerce Corporation.

Originally a programmer and software designer, he founded Progressive Computer Services, Inc., which published utility software for the IBM PC market. The company was best known for EZ-Menu, a utility that was declared PC Magazine "Editor's Choice", PC Home Journal "Best Product", and Personal Computing Magazine H "Publisher's Pick". Perry was the principal designer and architect of the prototype online yellow pages system for Bell Atlantic, an environmental database for the United Nations and an online hotel reservation system acquired by hotels.com.

Perry founded the e-commerce company InterCommerce Corporation, of which he is CEO. The company provides advanced e-commerce and Internet technology solutions through networks in the United States, England and the Isle of Man. As of 2005 it handles over US$2M in online transactions a month.

During the 1990s Perry developed many dot-com portal projects including Survey.net, an early online polling system, one of the earliest online shopping cart systems available on the Internet. He also registered a number of common domain names such as folk.com, nerd.com, wisdom.com, humankind.com and others. In 2000, Perry sold wisdom.com for US$475,000. At the time this was the third-highest cash sale for any domain name.

Perry is currently involved in a number of projects including a new content management system and a wine-tasting portal.

He contributed a chapter to HTML & CGI Unleashed, and contributed to The PC User's Survival Guide.

He resides in New Orleans and was a survivor of Hurricane Katrina. He also runs a recording studio.
