= Garret Chachere =

American football player and coach (born 1969)

Current position
- Title: Running backs coach
- Team: Western Kentucky
- Conference: C-USA

Biographical details
- Born: March 17, 1969 (age 57); New Orleans, Louisiana
- Education: Brother Martin High School; Tulane University, 1988

Playing career
- 1987–1988: Tulane
- Position: Running back

Coaching career (HC unless noted)
- 1991: Tulane (GA)
- 1992: Cheyney (RB/DB)
- 1993: Bloomsburg (WR/DB)
- 1994: Bucknell (DB)
- 1995–1997: Nicholls State (LB)
- 1998: Northeast Louisiana (WR/TE)
- 1999–2006: Tulane (LB/ST)
- 2007–2008: Memphis (ST)
- 2009–2011: Arizona (RB/WR)
- 2012: Southern Miss (TE/ST)
- 2013–2017: California (DE/LB/AHC/RB)
- 2017: New Mexico Highlands (OC/WR)
- 2018: Southeastern Louisiana (PGC/RB)
- 2019–present: Western Kentucky (RB)

Garret Chachere (born March 17, 1969) is an American football coach and former player who is currently the running backs coach at Western Kentucky.

== Playing career ==
Chachere is an alumnus of the Tulane University and played football at the school from 1987 to 1988.

== Coaching career ==
Chachere began his coaching career as a graduate assistant at his alma mater, Tulane University, in 1991. In 1992, Chachere accepted a position at Cheyney University of Pennsylvania where he served as both running backs and defensive backs coach before moving on to Bloomsburg University of Pennsylvania where he coached wide receivers and defensive backs for one year in 1993. In 1994, he became defensive backs coach at Bucknell University. After the 1994 season, he became linebackers coach at Nicholls State University from 1995 to 1997. In 1998, he coached wide receivers and tight ends at Northeast Louisiana.

Chachere returned to his alma mater, Tulane University, to coach linebackers and special teams from 1999 to 2006. For both the 2007 and 2008 seasons, he coached special teams at the University of Memphis. He then moved on to the University of Arizona where he coached running backs and wide receivers from 2009 to 2011. During his tenure at Arizona, he served as the chairman of the program committee for the American Football Coaches Association.

He then left to coach tight ends and special teams at the University of Southern Mississippi in 2012. On January 6, 2013 Chachere was announced as the defensive ends coach for the Golden Bears football team at the University of California, Berkeley. From 2014 to 2015, he was linebackers coach and was also named assistant head coach at California. With experience coaching both offense and defense, Chachere switched sides to coach running backs in 2016.

In February 2017, Chachere accepted his first coordinator position as the offensive coordinator and wide receivers coach at New Mexico Highlands University for the 2017 season. In January 2018, he was named the passing game coordinator and running backs coach at Southeastern Louisiana University for 2018. In January 2019, Chachere was named running backs coach at Western Kentucky University.
