= Archbishop Chapelle High School =

Location
- 8800 Veterans Boulevard; Metairie, (Jefferson Parish), Louisiana 70003; United States; 30°00′13″N 90°13′22″W

Information
- Type: Private, All-Girls
- Motto: Deus Providebit (God Will Provide)
- Religious affiliation: Catholic
- Patron saint: Our Lady of Prompt Succor
- Established: 1962
- School district: Archdiocese of New Orleans
- Principal: Connie Dantagnan
- Teaching staff: 39.1 (FTE) (2019–20)
- Grades: 8–12
- Gender: All-girl
- Enrollment: 558 (2019–20)
- Student to teacher ratio: 14.3 (2019–20)
- Colors: Green and white
- Mascot: Chipmunk
- Nickname: Chipmunks
- Accreditation: Southern Association of Colleges and Schools
- Newspaper: The Word
- Yearbook: Reflections
- School fees: $1,055 (2023-24)
- Tuition: $9,900 (2023-24)
- Finance: Director - Michelle Lambert
- Campus Ministry: Director - Megan Boudreau Claire '03
- Admissions: Director - Emily Radcliffe '11
- Athletic: Director - Dale Lacour
- Administration: Assistant Principal - Susan Panzavecchia '90
- Website: archbishopchapelle.org

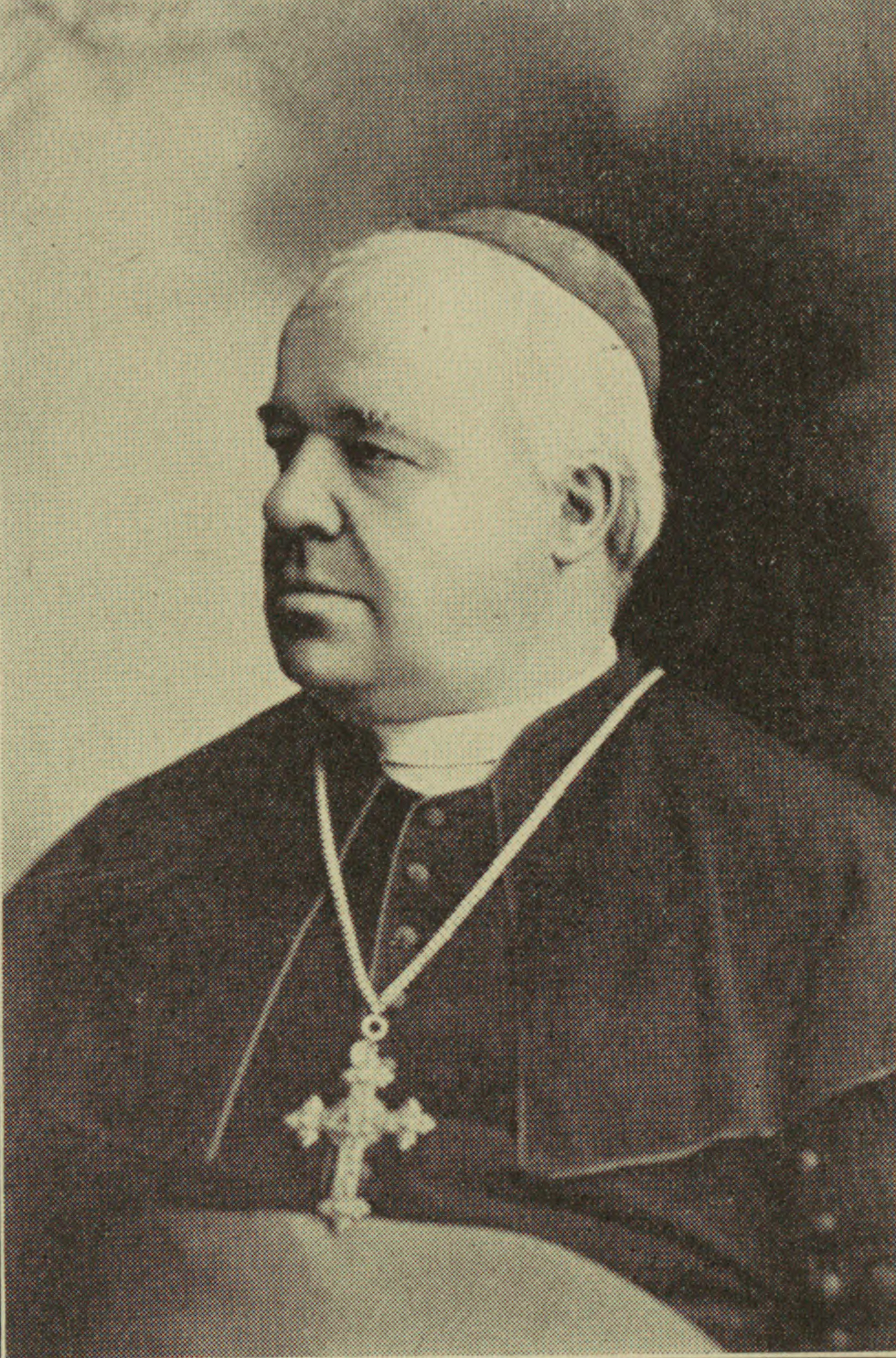
Archbishop Placide Louis Chapelle

Archbishop Chapelle High School is a Catholic secondary school for young women located in Metairie, Jefferson Parish, Louisiana, United States.

== History ==
Archbishop Chapelle High School was founded in 1962 by the Archdiocese of New Orleans and was named after Archbishop Placide Louis Chapelle, the first Archbishop of New Orleans in the twentieth century. The Sisters of Charity of the Incarnate Word staffed the school. In the first year, there were 236 students with nine teachers, which included four religious and four lay teachers. An additional grade was added each year thereafter until the 1965–1966 school year, which also saw Chapelle's first graduating class. The student council came up with Chippy in 1964 and they initiated a contest among the students to help choose a mascot for the young school. Suggestions included Raiderettes, Fleur de lis, Shamrocks and Chapelle's Belles, but Chipmunks was far and away the most popular choice.

== Academic courses ==
In addition to traditional secondary school classes, Chapelle also offers include fine arts courses, drama, publications studies (including yearbook and newspaper), family and consumer studies, business courses (including computer studies and accounting), and religion. There are several foreign language courses available to students from grades 8–12, including French, Spanish, and Latin.

== Student Clubs ==
Some clubs available are Ambassadors, French Club, Intramural Sports, Key Club, Matthew 25 Service Program, Mu Alpha Theta, National Art Honor Society, National Honor Society, National Junior Beta Club, National Spanish Honor Society, Student Council, and Varsity Quiz Bowl. In addition to these, there are other more specialized clubs listed on the high school's website.

Several clubs are in coordination with Archbishop Rummel High School, an all-male Catholic secondary school also located in Metairie. Chapelle Honors Advanced band students are members of the Archbishop Rummel Band. The Chapellettes are a dance team that accompany the Rummel Band.

== Athletics ==
Archbishop Chapelle athletics competes in the LHSAA.
